= Friederike Zeileis =

Austrian women's rights activist

- Born: Friederike Mautner von Markhof; 20 December 1872; Großjedlersdorf, Austria-Hungary
- Died: 1954 (aged 81–82); Gallspach, Austria
- Other names: Friederike Mautner Markhof-Zeileis, Fritzi Mautner Markhof, Friederike Mekler von Traunwies, Friederike Mekler von Traunweis Zeileis
- Occupation(s): women's rights activist, settlement worker
- Years active: 1901–1932
- Spouse: Valentin Zeileis
- Relatives: Adolf Ignaz Mautner von Markhof (grandfather)
- Family: Mautner Markhof

Friederike Zeileis (also known as Friederike Mekler von Traunwies, 20 December 1872 – 1954) was an Austrian women's right's activist and one of the founding members of the International Women's Suffrage Alliance. She was also involved in the founding and implementation of the Vienna Settlement Movement, serving in various capacities on its board from 1901 to 1932.

== Early life ==
Friederike Mautner von Markhof, known as "Fritzi", was born on 20 December 1872 in Großjedlersdorf, a village near Vienna, in Austria-Hungary to Karoline "Charlotte" (née Biehler) and Georg Heinrich Mautner von Markhof. Her father's family, originally from Smiřice in Bohemia, were involved in brewing, and her grandfather, Adolf Ignaz Mautner von Markhof was knighted for his development of a method to industrially produce compressed yeast. Her father expanded the brewery, which became the third-largest distillery in Europe, opening a yeast and brewing factory in Floridsdorf in 1864 and another in 1893. Mautner von Markhof grew up in the wealthy, assimilated Jewish family, known as much for their philanthropy as their entrepreneurial endeavors. On 21 June 1894, she married Luther (Dr. Ludwig) Mekler von Traunwies, a Procurer for the Lower Austrian Financial Ministry, who died in Baden on 2 September 1901. (Note: Though the Genealogisches Taschenbuch gives her husband's name as Alfred, and his death date as 1902, other sources confirm his name was Luther and the death occurred in 1901.)

== Activism ==
In 1901, Mekler von Traunwies, joined with founders, Marie Lang and Else Federn, and other interested women like Marianne Hainisch, Betty Kolm, Grete Löhr, Baroness Amelie von Langenau, and Lydia von Wolfring in the establishment of the Vienna Settlement Society. (Note: Korotin, and other sources for the Vienna Settlement Society give Mekler von Traunwies' name as Friederike Zeileis/Zeleis from 1901; however, this seems unlikely. Her first husband did not die until 1901 and her second husband was still married to his first wife Helene Gundler until 1903. Further, Valentin Zeileis was divorced in 1903 and made a tour around the world before moving to Vienna and marrying the widow Mekler von Traunwies in 1905.) Based on the model of the Passmore Edwards Settlement in London, the society aimed at uplifting the poor and provided a kindergarten, meals, medical clinics and theatrical evenings for children and their parents.

By 1903, Mekler von Traunwies was serving as president of the Vienna Settlement Society and would hold the post for the next four years. She attended the 2nd Conference of the International Woman Suffrage Alliance held in Berlin in 1904, which was its organizational meeting and joined the association as one of the founding members. In 1905, she married Valentin Zeileis, a divorcé with a young son, Friedrich G. Zeileis. The newly constituted family moved into an apartment at #7 Reichsratstraße and Zeileis developed a strong bond with her new step-son. In turn, her family influence was instrumental in helping Valentin make the business contacts he needed. She continued her involvement in the suffrage movement, translating for Carrie Chapman Catt on a trip to Vienna in 1906. Catt and Aletta Jacobs made the trip to Austria after the Copenhagen Conference of the IWSA to discuss women's rights with Austrian feminists. In 1907, she remained active in the Bund Österreichischer Frauenvereine (Federation of Austrian Women's Organizations), but stepped down as president of the Vienna Settlement Society, taking over the post as vice president. She would remain the vice president until 1920.

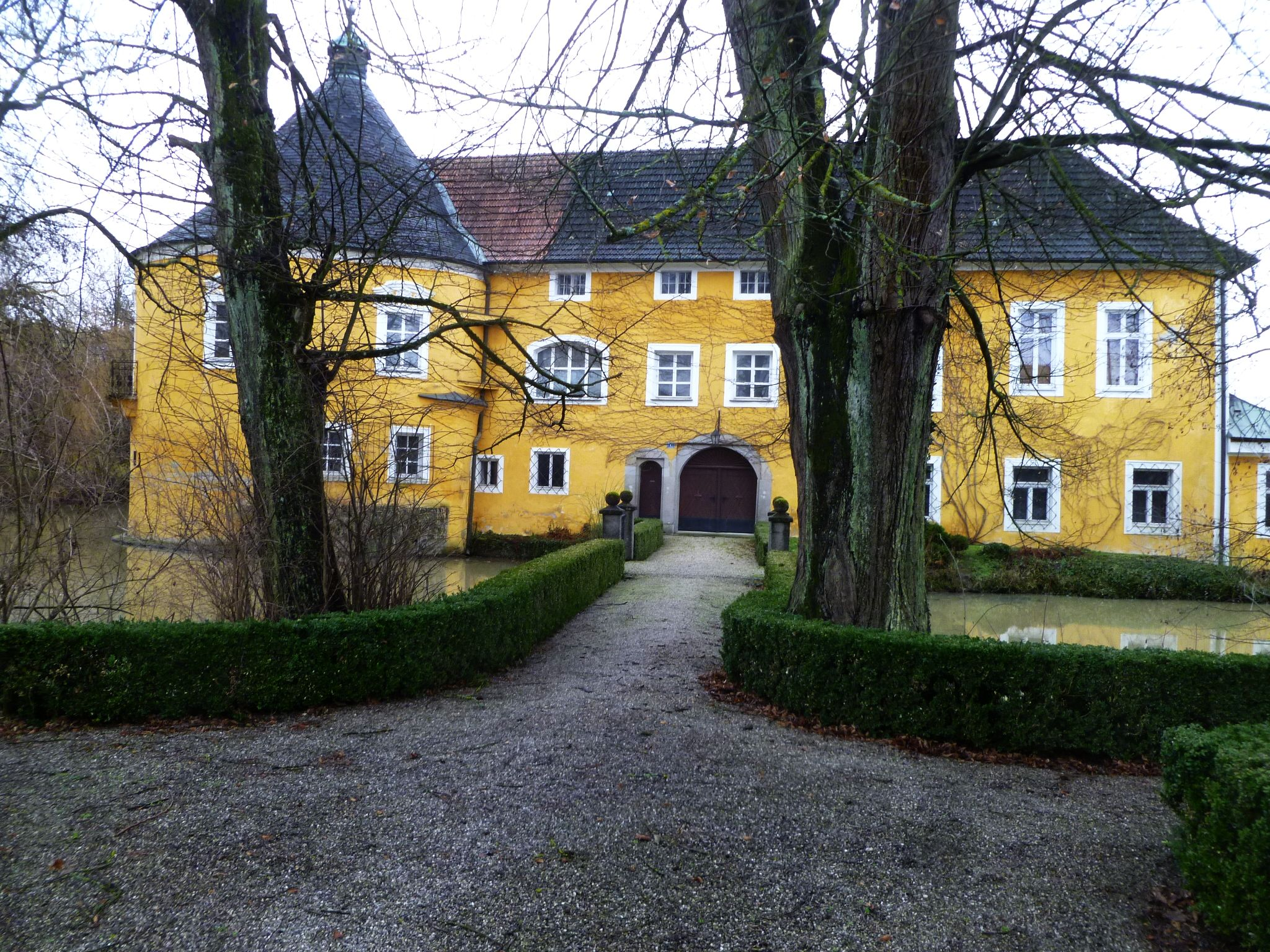
Gallspach Castle

In 1912, Zeileis' husband Valentin bought the Gallspach Castle from his friend Hugo Seyrl, a brewery owner. For eight years he commuted between Gallspach and Vienna, renovating the castle into a health spa. When the Austrian legislature passed a law in 1919 making all uninhabited castles subject to government expropriation, Valentin permanently settled his family in Gallspach. Though Zeileis was no longer living in Vienna, she remained active in the settlement society, serving as both a member or on its board through at least 1932.

== Death and legacy ==
Zeileis died in 1954 (May 4) in Gallspach.
