= Felix Somary =

Austrian-Swiss banker

Felix Somary (21 November 1881, Vienna, Austria-Hungary – 11 July 1956, Zurich, Switzerland) was an Austrian-Swiss banker; he is also noted as a scholar of political economy.

== Life ==
Felix Somary was born on 21 November 1881 in Vienna, then the capital of the Austro-Hungarian Empire. His father, Dr Simon Somary, was a lawyer and advocate of the Imperial and High Court. Four of his older siblings had died of diphtheria (then an incurable disease); he was consequently close to his sisters, Ella and Paula. Somary was educated at the Schottengymnasium in Vienna; whilst a schoolboy, he began tutoring in Greek, mathematics, and history at the age of fourteen. Shortly before leaving the Schottengymnasium, he wrote an essay on corporations in Austria, in which he outlined the transition from speculation to investment; the essay received both praise and a "searching critique" from future President of Italy Luigi Einaudi. Upon receiving his Matura in 1899 (aged seventeen), he enrolled in the Faculty of Law and Political Science of the University of Vienna, where he studied under Carl Menger (to whom he also served as an assistant) and Eugen von Philippovich. Whilst there, his classmates included Joseph Schumpeter, Rudolf Hilferding, Otto Bauer, Emil Lederer, and Ludwig von Mises.

Shortly after receiving his doctorate in 1904, Somary spent a year at the University of Berlin, intending to qualify later as a university lecturer in Vienna. During that period, he met Gustav von Schmoller, and befriended the legal scholar Otto von Gierke; he also dined with the sociologist Max Weber in Mannheim. Towards the end of his spell in Berlin, Eugen von Philippovich offered Somary the position of Assistant to the President at the Anglo-Austrian Bank, which he accepted; whilst working there, he met Sir Ernest Cassel. From 1910 to 1914 he taught at the Hochschule für Staatswissenschaftliche Fortbildung in Berlin, and he was also active in promoting commercial ties between Britain, Germany and Austria both in eastern Europe and the Near East. He later said that without the assassination of Archduke Franz Ferdinand "the large-scale catastrophe [of World War I] could have been averted, since all causes of the Anglo-German conflict had been eliminated"; in particular, he considered the summer of 1914 to have marked the start of a "new era" of Anglo-German cooperation, which the assassination interrupted.

During World War I, he reorganized the National Bank of occupied Belgium; he worked together with Hjalmar Schacht, of whom he speaks favorably in his memoirs. While in Berlin in March 1916 he co-authored a famous report with Max Weber. This warned Germany and Austria against intensifying the use of submarine warfare. Their argument was that intensification might provoke the US into entering the war on the side of Britain, and the consequence of this would be to remove the possibility of a neutral source of post-war credit, which would inevitably be needed by the combatant nations once hostilities had ceased. He also angered Ludendorff by writing a paper which stated that Poland could find a natural place in the multinational Austrian state. In 1919 he entered as a senior partner in Bankhaus Blankart & Co. in Zurich.

After the war, European banks were long on war bonds, worth absolutely nothing. He realised that the choice was between bankruptcy and hyperinflation, but although he favoured the former it was the latter which ensued. He had argued his viewpoint at a German association for economists called the Verein für Sozialpolitik. He predicted the Great Depression, which began in 1929, as early as September 1926 when he gave a lecture warning of the dangers of relying on the US for credit given the protectionist tendencies of that country. It was because of this prediction that he became known as The Raven of Zurich, the raven being a bird associated with dire omens. He was one of several economists who later expressed the view that the depression might not have occurred if there had not been a conjunction of events, including the election of Hitler in Germany and of Roosevelt in the US. He was in New York City when the stock markets were plummeting and, seeing that fellow bankers were buying recklessly, he sent a wire to Zurich telling his associates there to sell all equity. By 1931 he was so convinced of the economic power exercised by the US that he wrote "It is almost an intolerable thought that the U.S.A. will be the centre of industry, while Europe will act as hotel keeper to Americans."

In 1930 he married Austrian countess May Demblin and became a Catholic. Two years later, he became a Swiss citizen. He taught at the Heidelberg University as well as in US universities. At Chicago, he was a guest of his friend Schumpeter, with whom he shared the interest in the theory of the economic cycle. Before the start of World War II, he tried to convince Baron Rothschild to take his wealth and his person out of Germany but Rothschild did not listen to him and barely saved himself. In August 1934 he was of the recipients—on a list that "reads like a Who is Who? in business cycle theory", according to Boianovsky and Trautwein—of a paper concerning theories of the business cycle, written by Gottfried Haberler.

He was an advisor to the chief of the Swiss Federal Department of Public Economy, attending a meeting in Washington, D.C. in 1939 when the Swiss government was trying to obtain emergency war supplies from the US government.

He, his wife, two sons and a daughter moved to the United States in 1940, taking the last ship bound for the US from Spain. Béla Bartók was on the same ship, as was the poet and writer Stefan Zweig, with whom Somary was one of the last people to speak before the latter's suicide.

From 1941 to 1943 he advised the American Department of Defense on finance issues. He had been consulted regarding the methods that should be deployed in order to establish a sound currency in the European and African war zones, this being seen prior to the allied landings in North Africa and France as an important pre-requisite for achieving economic stability. When they told him that the Americans were thinking of abolishing the Japanese Emperor, he was outraged: "And then—he asked—with whom are you going to sign a peace treaty?"

His book Bankpolitik was praised by Joseph Schumpeter in his Geschichte der ökonomischen Analyse. After the war, he had a role in the birth of Mediobanca. The Italian large banks were not very enthusiastic about the idea of creating, ex novo, an Italian merchant bank; Mattioli, the president of Comit, turned to Somary for a loan; Somary said he was willing to give a larger loan, and even to buy company shares. At this point, the Italians convinced themselves that the project was good, and financed it.

== Publications ==
- Somary, Felix (1915). Bankpolitik (in German). Tubingen: C B Mohr.
- Somary, Felix. Émile Lévasseur.
- Somary, Felix. Die Erfahrungen des letzten Jahres für die Kriegsbereitschaft des deutschen Geld- und Kapitalmarktes (in German).
- Somary, Felix. Währungs-probleme Österreich-Ungarns (in German).
- von Philippovich, Eugen [in German]; Somary, Felix. Grundriss der politischen Oekonomie (in German).
- von Philippovich, Eugen; Somary, Felix. Allgemeine Volkswirtschaftslehre (in German).
- Somary, Felix (1931). Changes in the structure of world economics since the war. Wandlungen der Weltwirtschaft seit dem KriegeEnglish. London: P S King & Son.
- Somary, Felix (1933). End the crisis! A plea for action. Krisenwende?English. New York: E. P. Dutton & Co.
- Somary, Felix (1932). Krisenwende? (in German). Berlin: S. Fischer.
- Somary, Felix. Die Ursachen der Krise (in German).
- Somary, Felix (1952). Democracy at bay: a diagnosis and a prognosis (translation of Krise und Zukunft der Demokratie) (1st American ed.). New York: Knopf.
- Somary, Felix; Somary, Wolfgang (1994). Erinnerungen eines politischen Meteorologen (in German) (Reprinted ed.). Matthes & Seitz. ISBN 978-3-88221-796-4.
- Somary, Felix (1986). A. J. Sherman (trans.) (ed.). The Raven of Zurich: The Memoirs of Felix Somary. New York: St Martin's.
