= Antisemitism is the socialism of fools =

Statement opposing antisemitism attributed to August Bebel or Ferdinand Kronawetter

"Antisemitism is the socialism of fools" (German: Der Antisemitismus ist der Sozialismus der dummen Kerle) is a phrase denouncing the notion that Jewish "wealth" or "power" is the root of social injustice.

== Etymology ==
While the phrase is often attributed to German socialist activist and politician August Bebel or even to German philosopher, political theorist and economist Karl Marx, Bebel himself, and later British historians Peter G. J. Pulzer and Richard J. Evans, all attributed it to Austrian left-liberal politician Ferdinand Kronawetter. The first known usage of the phrase by Kronawetter was in a speech at an April, 1889, general meeting of the Margarethen District Electoral Association in Vienna; on 24 April 1889, the Neue Freie Presse published Kronawetter's speech, wherein he said: "Der Antisemitismus ist nichts als der Socialismus des dummen Kerls von Wien" ('Antisemitism is nothing but the socialism of the idiot of Vienna'). By the 1890s, the expression was widely used among German social democrats.

== Legacy ==
Philosopher Leo Strauss argued that Soviet leader Joseph Stalin may have believed that, because fools were numerous, a "socialism of fools" would be advantageous. Strauss suggested that Stalin deliberately fostered antisemitism for this reason.
