= Assassination of Karl von Stürgkh =

1916 shooting of an Austrian politician

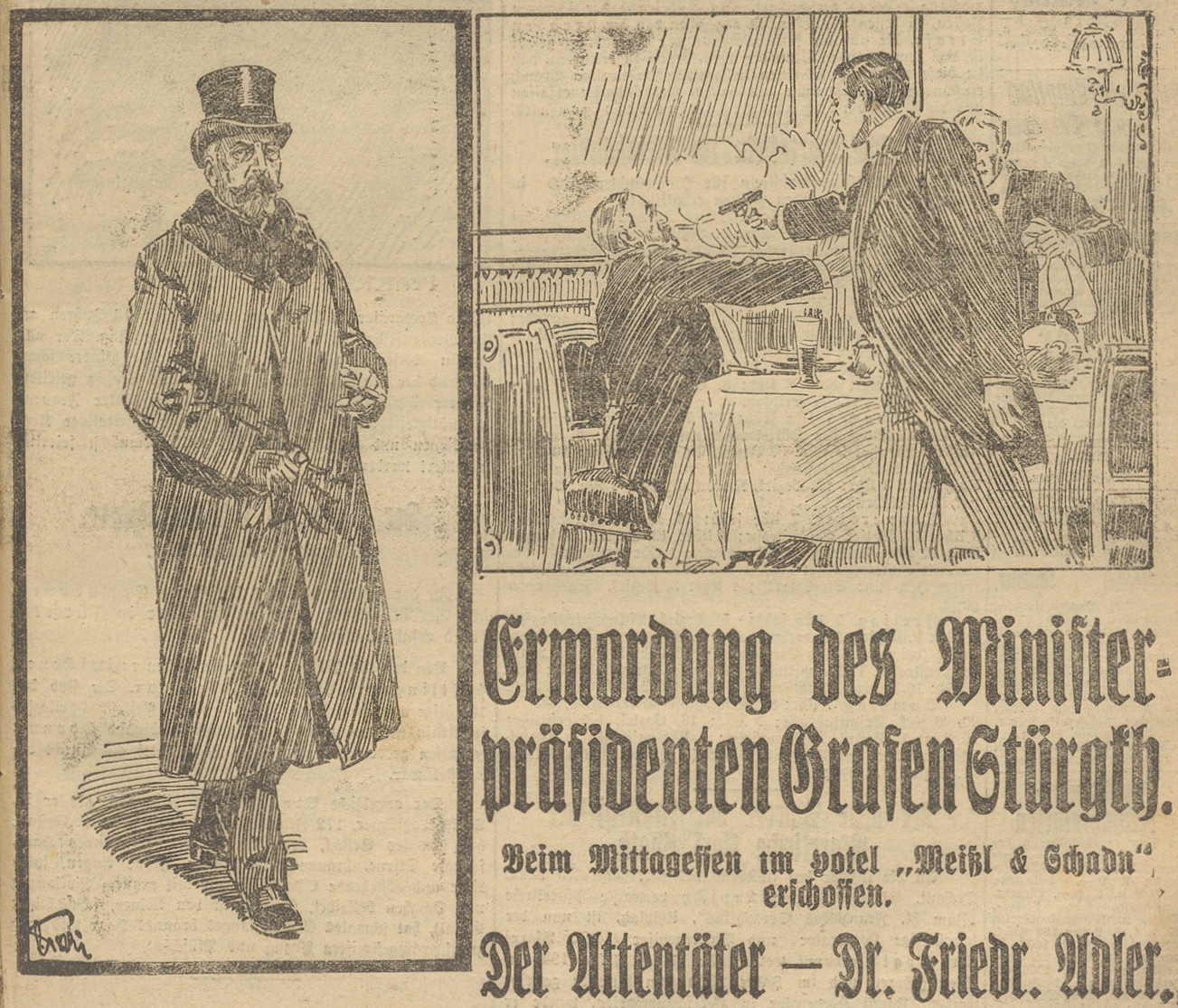
- Front page of the Austrian Illustrierte Kronen Zeitung newspaper, where an illustrator re-enacted the act.
- Location: 48°12′23″N 16°22′16″E; Meissl & Schadn Hotel, Vienna (Austria-Hungary)
- Date: October 21, 1916; Around noon
- Attack type: Assassination
- Weapon: pistol
- Deaths: 1
- Perpetrator: Friedrich Adler
- Convictions: Radicalism anti-World War I protest

The Assassination of Karl von Stürgkh, the Prime Minister of the government of Cisleithania, took place on October 21, 1916, in the Meissl & Schadn Hotel in Vienna. Karl von Stürgkh, at that time acting head of cabinet of the Austrian part of the monarchy was shot three times by Austrian social democrat Friedrich Adler and died immediately. However due to the ongoing World War I and the later death of the Austrian Emperor Francis Joseph I, the event was left aside from a larger public response.

== Prelude ==
One of the main reasons for the assassination was dissatisfaction of the part of Austro-Hungarian citizens with the Prime Minister, who was unable to obtain a parliamentary majority in the Imperial Council (Reichsrat). According to the then Article 14 of Austrian Constitution, the Prime Minister could enforce government regulations even without the help of the Parliament (as is the case with the Constitution Laws and Article No. 49 of the French Third Republic). Stürgkh used emergency measures even before the World War I war started in 1914, for example for the issuance of the so-called St. Ann's patents, dissolving the Bohemian Diet in 1913. After 1914, the Imperial Council in Vienna ceased to be convened in connection with the war, and the emergency provisions of Austrian laws thus gained substantial importance. Censorship and other measures of a totalitarian nature were tightened, which was supposed to enable Austria-Hungary to conduct the war at the home front more effectively. Stürgkh was also a keen supporter of Austria-Hungary's entry into the war in July 1914 against Serbia. In the third year of the conflict war-oriented economy wasn't able to provide enough food for its population.

== Attack ==
The assassin was a 37-years old Friedrich Adler, lawyer, social democrat and son of the chairman of the Social Democratic Party of Austria Victor Adler. The assassination took place in the dining room of the luxurious Meissl & Schadn Hotel in the centre of Vienna. Adler came to the dining room at lunchtime, easily recognized Stürgkh sitting by the wall at the end of the room. Then Adler took place and waited. While Stürgkh was just eating his plum cake for lunch, Adler then approached him and fired three shots from an immediate distance with a pistol. Then uttered the words "Down with absolutism, we want peace!", waited for the police to arrive to let himself to be peacefully arrested.

== Aftermath ==
The Social Democratic party organ Arbeiter-Zeitung called the assassination a "strange and incomprehensible" act, whereas left leaning German-language-newspapers outside the censorship of Germany and Austria, in neutral Switzerland, attributed his deed to an understandable matter of last resort against an anti-democratic tyrant, who had successfully blocked the Austrian parliament from convening since 1913. After a period when attempts were made to avoid a trial by declaring Adler insane, he was brought to court in May 1917 where he was able to publicly present the killing as a revolutionary action in the context of the case against the war, as well as against 'reformist' Social Democrats like Karl Renner.

In the judgment, he was finally sentenced to death in the spring of 1917, but later the sentence was changed to 18 years of imprisonment in a labor camp by the decision of Emperor Charles I. On 2 November 1918, during the dissolution of the monarchy, he was pardoned and released from prison. Friedrich Adler died in Vienna in 1960.

Emperor Franz Joseph appointed Ernest von Koerber as Stürgkh's successor, one of his last official acts, as he died four weeks later. The significance of the assassination is often disputed and due to the death of a 86-years old Emperor in November 1916 the event was left aside from a larger public response. Neverthenless the act is being linked to the resumption of the activities of the Imperial Council at the beginning of 1917 and the easing of some draconian measures that had been introduced in Cisleithania during the war.

== Gallery ==
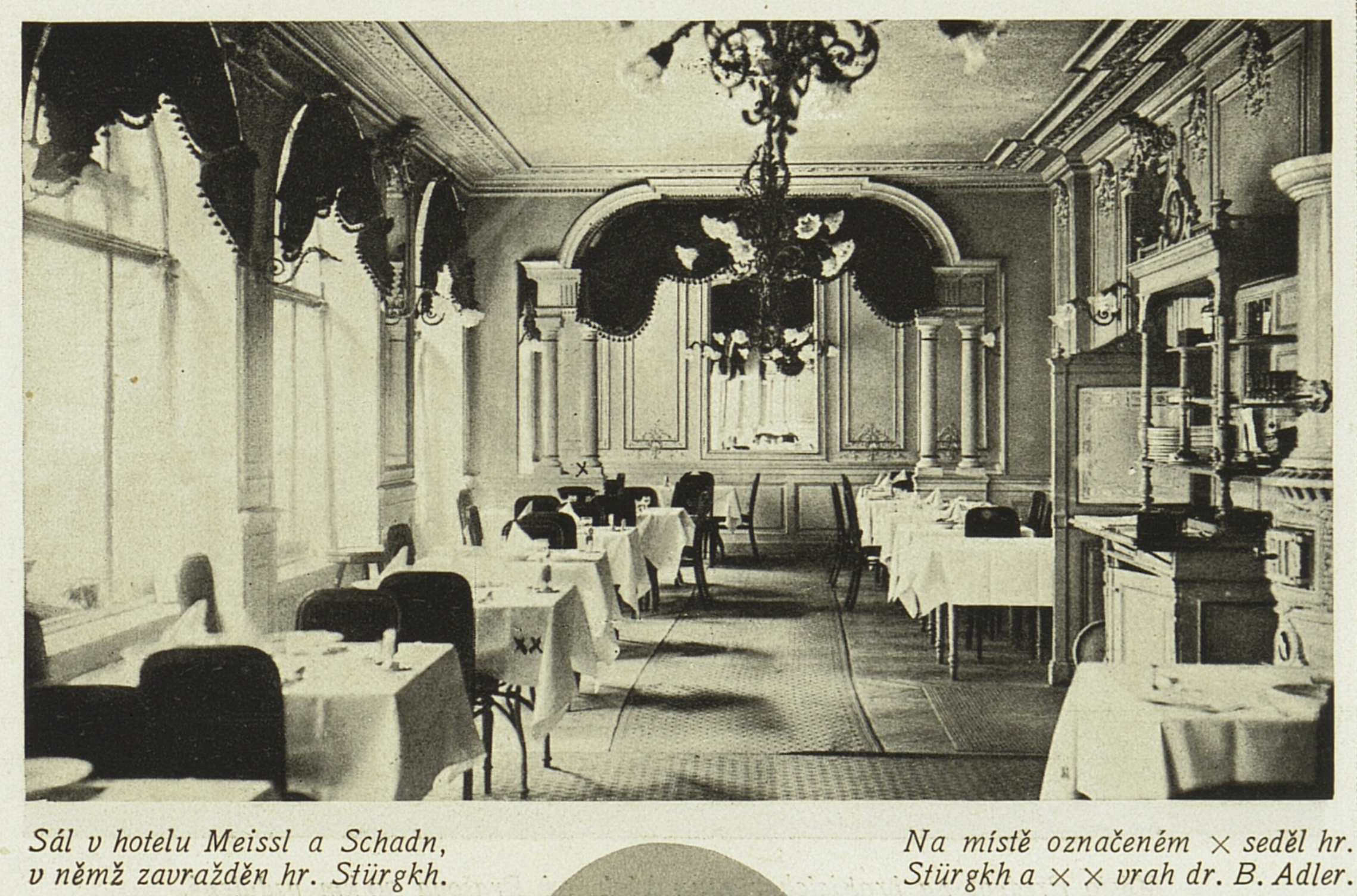
Dining hall in the Meissl & Schadn Hotel, where Stürgkh was murdered

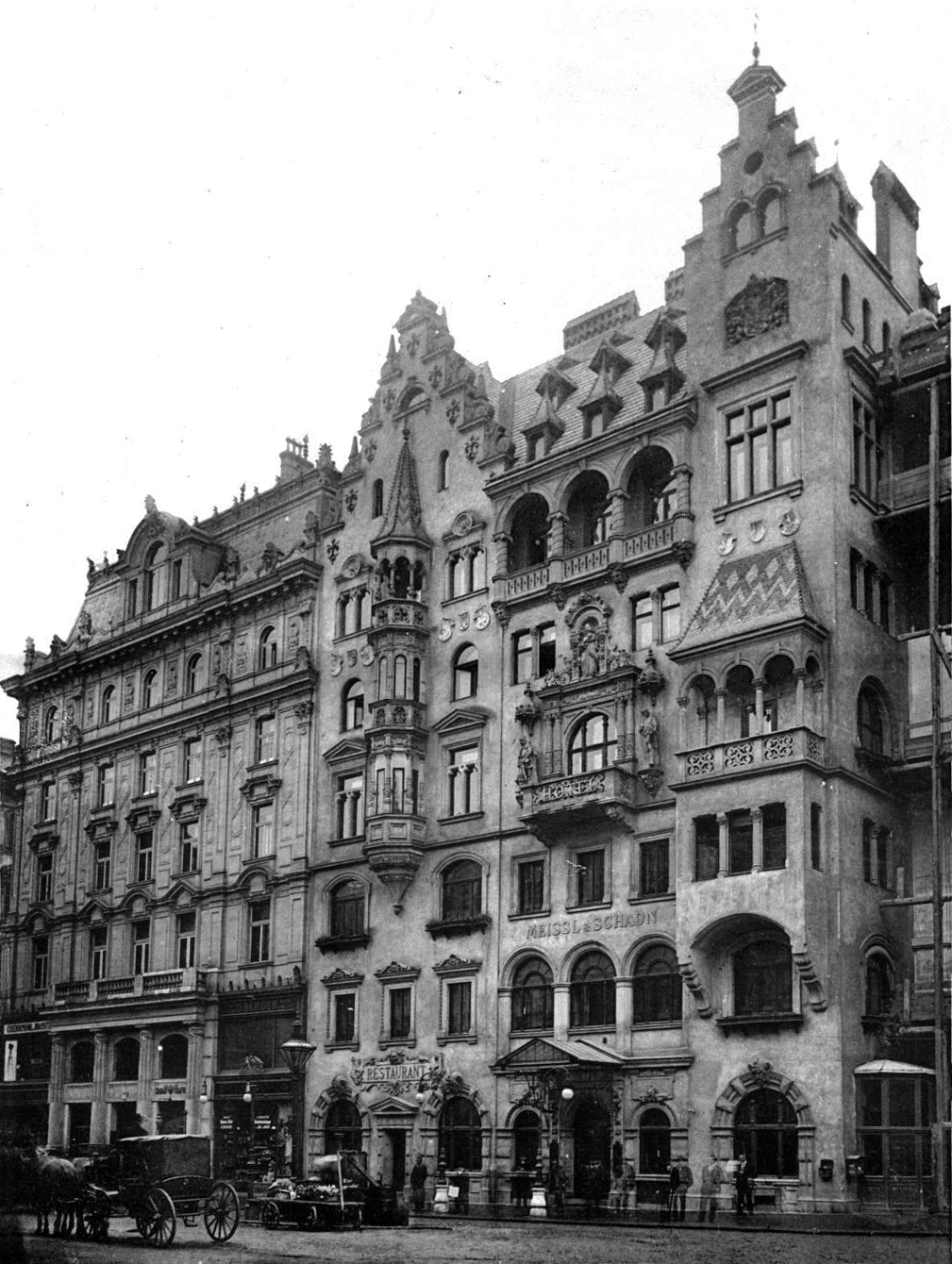
Meissl & Schadn Hotel around 1900

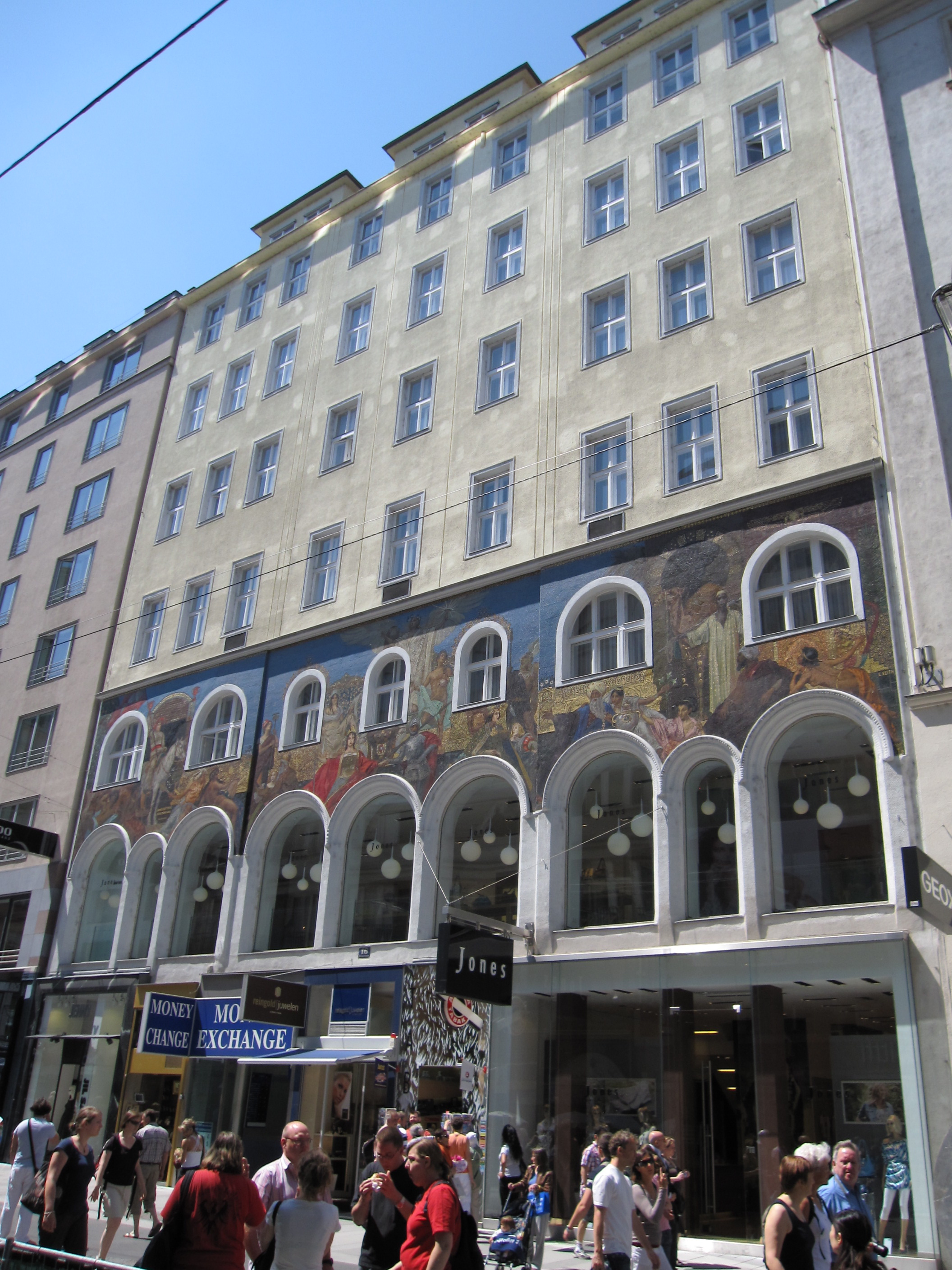
Former Meissl & Schadn Hotel in 2009

== See also ==
- History of Austria-Hungary during World War I
- History of Vienna
- List of assassinations in Europe

== Bibliography ==
- Beckett, Ian (2012). The Making of the First World War. Yale University Press. ISBN 9780300163667.
- Gulick, Charles A. (2021). Austria from Habsburg to Hitler: Volume 1 – Labor's Workshop of Democracy. University of California Press. ISBN 978-0-52032-762-7.
- "Notizen: Ermordnung den Prasident-Minister Stürgkh" [Notices: (Murder of the Prime Minister Stürgkh]. Illustrierte Kronen Zeitung (in German). Vienna, Austria. 22 October 1916. p. 1.
