= Lydia von Wolfring =

Polish-born Austrian social reformer

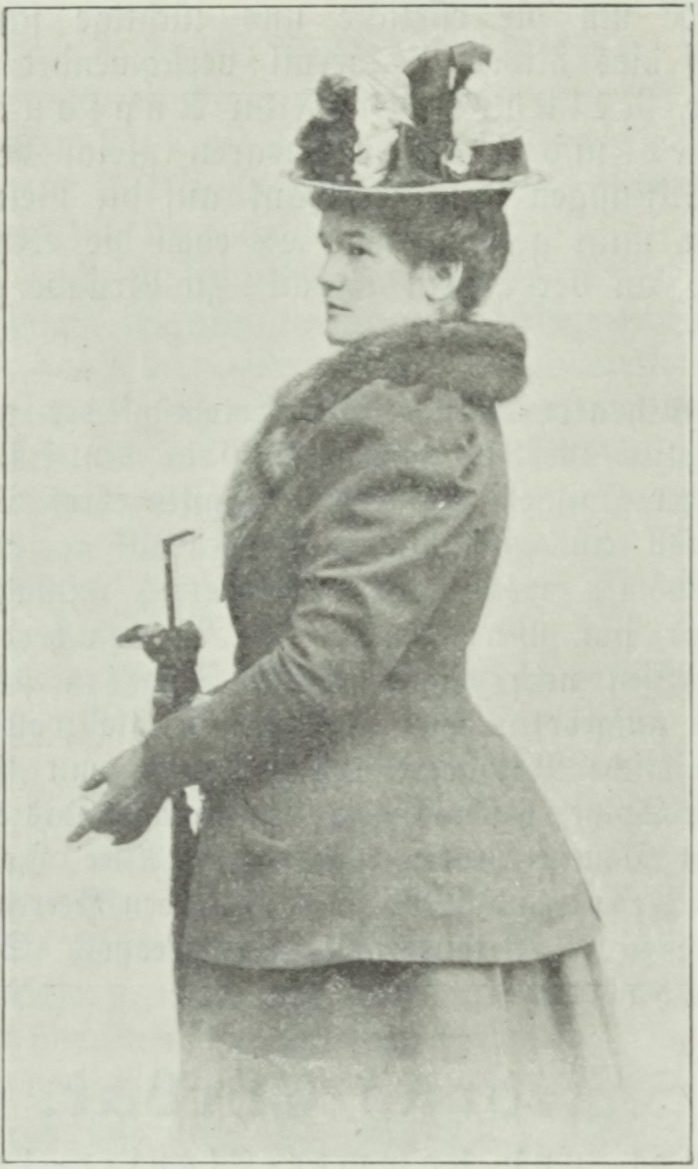
- von Wolfring in 1899
- Born: 27 March 1867; Warsaw, "Congress Poland", Russian Empire
- Died: after 1920
- Occupations: Social reformer Child protection pioneer
- Father: Dr. Emil von Wolfring (1832-1906)

Lydia von Wolfring (born 27 March 1867: died after 1920) was a Polish-born social reformer. She lived in Vienna for slightly more than ten years, between 1899 and 1910. During that time she emerged as a highly effective pioneering advocate for child protection.

== Life and works ==
Lydia von Wolfring was born in Warsaw, the elder of her father's two daughters by approximately two years. Warsaw at this time was an ethnically diverse city of some 250,000 inhabitants, and the administrative capital of "Congress Poland", a semi-detached state of the Russian Empire. Of Lydia's mother nothing is known. Her father, Dr. Emil von Wolfring (1832–1906) was a professor of Ophthalmology at the University of Warsaw. His name suggests that the family may have been members of the city's German-speaking minority, but there are references to Lydia having spoken German, Russian, Polish, English and Italian. (She wrote articles in French, which many in Europe still regarded as the universal language at this time.) Vienna citizen registration records for 1910/11 (by which time her father had died) show her occupations as "Gutsbesitzerin" ("property owner") and "Schriftstellerin" ("author"): she described herself as a "Kosmopolitin auf dem Gebiete der Philanthropie" ("cosmopolitan [woman] in the philanthropy sector"). There are indications that her health was never robust. Her first contact with Vienna came about through Michael Hainisch whom she met and got to know while both of them were undergoing a hydrotherapy cure at Kaltenleutgeben. Michael Hainisch, who later embarked on a successful career in national politics, was a son to the leading women's rights activist Marianne Hainisch. Much later, in a memoire, he would recall Lydia von Wolfring as "a girl both beautiful and brilliant".

She was awakened to the subject of child protection during the winter of 1898/99 through reading the 1897 German-language edition of "Entartete Mütter. Eine psychisch-juridische Abhandlung" (loosely, "Degenerated mothers: a psychological-juridical study") by Lino Ferriani. Ferriani was an Italian prosecuting magistrate based in Como. He had been troubled by cases he had encountered. Von Wolfring reacted by getting in touch with Ferriani, whom she visited in March 1899. Under his guidance she studied the relevant literature and undertook an eight-month research tour of northern Italy, Switzerland and France. She visited prisons, asylums, so-called correctional institutions and orphanages. She spoke to parents who had been convicted of child abuse. She went on to make a detailed study of child protection associations which had already been set up in the United States and in England in order to benchmark these for the future creation of a child protection office in Vienna integrated into the justice system. This auto-didactic approach to study and the acquisition of knowledge more broadly was not untypical among well informed young women impatient to learn more, at a time when university attendance was, in almost every case, accessible only to males.

The decision to take a lead as a child protection activist in Austria was partly down to friendships and family connections that she and her sister already had to the country. There were more personal experiences that led her in the same direction. During a prison visit in Innsbruck she came across a case of boys aged between 10 and 12 being detained and left in solitary confinement simply in order to protect them from the adult prisoners, there being no more appropriate provision for juvenile offenders. A further trigger came from widely read press reports of two cases of child abuse leading to the deaths of victims. More broadly the reports triggered outrage among readers of mass-circulation newspapers who had previously been able to avoid awareness of the extreme outcomes to which such cases might lead. Today it must nevertheless be recognised that certain actions within the family which today would be widely seen in western Europe as abusive were still completely normal during the final decades of the nineteenth century. Parents had a "right to punish" bad behaviour by their own children: physical punishment was most frequently carried out by fathers.

On 7 November 1899 Lydia arrived in Vienna armed with an impressive collection of facts and statistics. It is not clear whether she was accompanied by her aging father, or if he was already by this stage living in Vienna. It seems likely that her younger sister Sophie, who according to at least one source had married the ambitious young university professor of psychology, Sigmund Fuchs (1859–1903) in 1896, was already living in the city. Sophie had met her husband while she was studying at the university medical faculty. Lydia had already, in June 1899, undertaken a culture-oriented trip to Paris during the course of which she had met the pioneering Vienna feminist Marianne Hainisch. From reports provided by Hainisch it is clear that the lengthy conversations that they held that summer, Lydia von Wolfring had already formulated a clear and detailed action programme to be implemented once she moved to Vienna. She arrived with the statutes and organisation plan for an Austrian child protection association fully worked through. She recruited child protection campaigners and co-workers, at least initially, from activist members of the women's movement in Vienna, which comprised women, such as herself, from the city's haute-bourgeoisie. She sustained close contacts, in particular, with Marianne Hainisch and Auguste Fickert. The inaugural meeting of the "Kinder-Schutz- und Rettungsgesellschaft" ("Child Protection and Rescue Society") was held in Vienna on 28 December 1899. Von Wolfring delivered a lecture on the topic "How should we protect children from mis-treatment (Note: The German-language word used here for "mis-treatment" is the same as the German word commonly used for "torture".) and Crime?". The lecture was subsequently featured in the Year Book for 1903 of the American Academy of Political and Social Science.

She was offered but turned down the presidency if the new association. This, in the judgement of supporters and admirers, was an error. She nevertheless accepted a critical organisational role as its "general secretary". High hopes accompanied the launch of the association, and by the time Lydia von Wolfring resigned from the executive committee in 1901 important progress had been made. There were 90 children being looked after in residential care, allocated between a house in Kritzendorf and two "villas" at Maria Enzersdorf (both locations being just outside Vienna). Later during 1901, becoming increasingly restless, she quit the "Kinder-Schutz- und Rettungsgesellschaft", keen to concentrate on social reform more broadly and to campaign - not without some success in the longer term - for child protection to be more firmly embedded in statute and, in the more immediate term, treated as a government priority. Implicitly, she seems to have taken the view that some of those calling the shots at the "Kinder-Schutz- und Rettungsgesellschaft" were excessively accepting about the status quo, and she began to gather friends around her in order to set up a new organisation. The "Pestalozziverein zur Förderung des Kinderschutzes und der Jugendfürsorge in Wien" ("Vienna Pestalozzi Association for the promotion of child protection and youth welfare") was launched in 1903. Residential care for abused and neglected children again became the priority, but expansion seems to have been driven by need rather than by criteria based on affordability: finding the funds for the organisation's activities was a constant struggle. For as long as her health held out, von Wolfring was tireless in her fundraising efforts, while also pursuing her researches into the causes of social alienation affecting children. She continued to write articles and deliver lectures detailing the changes that were necessary in order to address society's pressing need for structured child protection. She pursued the demands, which she had first published in a 12-page booklet published in 1902, for an end to societal acceptance of fathers' rights to commit violence against children [as a disciplinary device]. In August 1907 she organised and led the first Austrian Child Protection Congress, which was held in Vienna.

Lydia von Wolfring left Vienna in 1910, and little is known of her final years. Research in the Vienna citizen registration records discloses only that she left the city "on health grounds". Towards the end of her time in Vienna it is known that she suffered a health breakdown and was required to undergo a major operation which failed to deliver a cure for her condition. It is known, also, that Tuberculosis was rife in Vienna during this period, and references have been found to her having "commuted between Switzerland and Warsaw, always stopping off in Vienna along the way" during the later years of her life. Her sister's young husband had died in 1903 and when her sister died in 1920 it was at Davos, a health resort well known at the time for the healing properties against Tuberculosis of its high-altitude mountain air. Irrespective of the state of her own health, Lydia von Wolfring was still alive in January 1920 when her name appeared as one of the originators of the announcement, which appeared in Vienna's daily newspaper, the Neue Freie Presse, of her sister's death. In that announcement she is identified as "Lydia v.Wolfring, Warschau", indicating that she had survived for long enough to experience Poland's return to independence.

Lydia von Wolfring's contributions did not go unnoticed abroad. Particular joy accompanied her acceptance of an honorary membership of the respected New York Society for the Prevention of Cruelty to Children. It was an honour accorded to very few.
