= Engelbert Pernerstorfer =

Austrian politician (1850–1918)

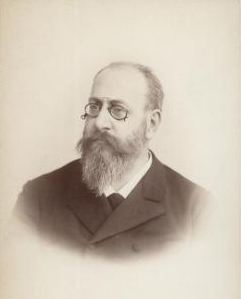
- Pernerstorfer in 1896

Personal details
- Born: 27 April 1850 Vienna, Austrian Empire
- Died: 6 January 1918 (aged 67) Vienna, Austria-Hungary
- Party: Constitutional Party; United Left; Social Political Party; Social Democratic Workers' Party
- Education: University of Vienna
- Occupation: Politician, journalist, pedagogue, teacher

Engelbert Pernerstorfer (27 April 1850 – 6 January 1918) was an Austrian politician. He was initially a liberal reformer, later a nationalist and finally a prominent social democrat. He was also a member of the Reichstag for years.

== Biography ==
Pernerstorfer was born on 27 April 1850 in Vienna. He was the son of a tailor. He graduated from the Schottengymnasium. In the years 1870–1874, he studied philosophy at the University of Vienna and later worked as a teacher at various educational institutes in Vienna. During his secondary studies, Pernerstorfer personally met Victor Adler, a founding figure of the Social Democratic Workers' Party of Austria. He himself has been involved politically and publicly for a long time. In 1881, he took over the editorship of the Deutsche Worte newspaper.

In the 1885 elections, he became a member of the Imperial Council (National Legislature), where he represented the city curia, the Vienna New Town district, Neunkirchen, etc. Although he initially entered as an independent candidate, he later joined the Vereinigte Deutsche Linke club, to which several prominent German left-liberals belonged. Already at that time he openly sympathized with pan-Germanism and showed strong anti-Slavic sentiments, being in favor of the complete Germanization of Austria and one of the authors of the Linz Program of 1882. That is why after the collapse of the Vereinigte Deutsche Linke, he became a member of the Deutscher Club in parliament. In 1890, he is listed as a member of the strongly nationalist club Deutschnationale Vereinigung and used to be an ally of Georg von Schönerer.

Later he distanced himself from von Schönerer because of his disagreement with his antisemitism. During the 1880s, he and Ferdinand Kronawetter became leading workers' rights advocates on the Imperial Council. In the 1891 elections, he again defended his parliamentary term and sat in the Viennese parliament until the end of the chamber's term in 1897. Even after the 1891 elections, he is mentioned as a member of the Deutschnationale Vereinigung, but already in 1891 he had separated from this organization and worked in the Imperial Council as a social reformer, close to Fabian socialism, being one of the founders of the Social Political Party. From 1896 he joined the Social Democratic Workers' Party. Within the party, he and Adler represented the national wing, more receptive to German-Austrian national affairs and interests and concerned about the "threat of Pan-Slavism".

In the 1901 elections, he returned to the Reichstag again, this time as an elected deputy for the general curia in the district of Vienna, Baden, Mödling, etc. He also triumphed in the 1907 elections, already held according to universal and equal suffrage, that is, without curiae, when he won a mandate for the Lower Austrian district 40. He was a member of the parliamentary faction of the Club of German Social Democrats and became vice-president of the Reichstag Chamber of Deputies, being him the first social democrat in history to hold this position. He also won a parliamentary seat in the 1911 election, again in the Lower Austrian district 40. He continued to serve as vice-president of the chamber and sat in the Viennese parliament until his death. He died on 6 January 1918 in Vienna, at the age of 67. He was subsequently succeeded as vice-president by Karl Seitz.

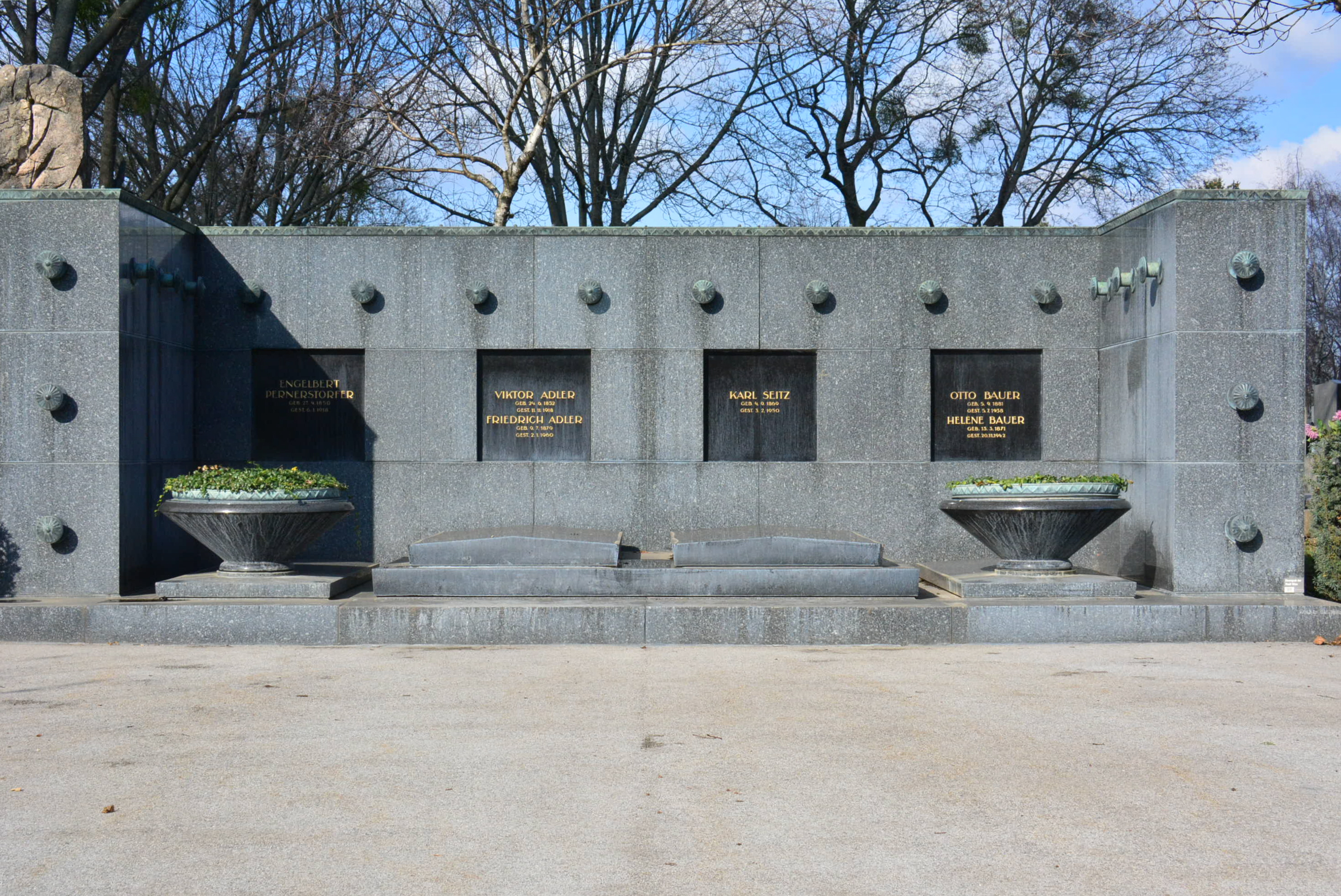
Grave complex of the final resting places of Victor Adler, Otto Bauer, Karl Seitz and Engelbert Pernerstorfer, Vienna Central Cemetery

In 1919, Pernerstorfergasse street in Vienna, the 10th district, was named after him. The Pernerstorferhof, an urban residential complex in the same district, was also named after him.

At the beginning of the 1920s, the Library for Social Science Studies of the Vienna Chamber of Workers and Employees acquired Pernerstorfer's private library.
