= Social Political Party (Austria) =

Social Political Party Sozialpolitische Partei
- Founded: 1896
- Preceded by: Fabian Society of Vienna
- Headquarters: Vienna
- Ideology: Fabianism; Liberalism; Social liberalism Progressivism; Anti-clericalism; Feminism; German nationalism Pan-Germanism
- Political position: Left-wing

The Social Political Party (Austrian German: Sozialpolitische Partei) was a liberal party of social reform intellectuals founded in Vienna in 1896. From 1896 to 1919 it was of greater political importance, especially in Vienna and Lower Austria.

== Background ==
The concerns of bourgeois social reform, equality before the law, equalization of social tensions, women's emancipation, etc., as represented by the Fabian Society in United Kingdom, also found an echo in Austria-Hungary. The founding of the "Wiener Fabier-Gesellschaft" (Fabian Society of Vienna) in 1893 was followed in 1896 by that of the Social Political Party. This party founding by the Viennese Fabians can also be seen as an attempt to renew the liberal camp against the onslaught of Karl Lueger's Sociochristians, who were fighting for political power in Vienna at the time with massive anti-Semitic slogans. Despite an impressive start with a large election meeting in the large hall of the Musikverein on 28 October 1896, the new party was never able to assert itself in the emerging age of mass parties and remained a respected or (because of its anti-clericalism) rudely opposed party of dignitaries.

Well-known representatives of the Social Political Party included the economist Eugen von Philippovich, the women's rights activists Auguste Fickert, Ernestine von Fürth and Marianne Hainisch, the philosopher Josef Popper-Lynkeus and the Reichsrat deputies Ferdinand Kronawetter and Julius Ofner. The well-known Fabian Engelbert Pernerstorfer, on the other hand, decided as early as 1896 to run for the Social Democrat side.

In the First Republic, Michael Hainisch, who came from the Social Political Party, served as the highly respected Federal President for eight years.
