= Ferdinand Kronawetter =

Austrian left-liberal politician

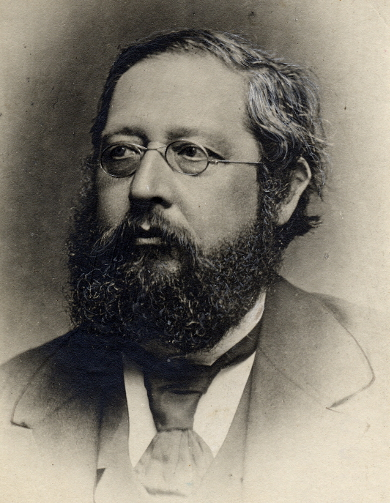
- Ferdinand Kronawetter (1838-1913), Austrian politician
- Born: 26 February 1838; Vienna, Austrian Empire
- Died: 20 January 1913 (aged 74); Pottschach, Lower Austria
- Citizenship: Austro-Hungarian
- Education: University of Vienna
- Occupation: Politician
- Political party: Social Political Party

Ferdinand Kronawetter (26 February 1838 – 20 January 1913) was an Austrian left-liberal politician, an advocate for democracy and workers' rights, and a vocal opponent of antisemitism.

== Life ==
Kronawetter was born in Vienna, the son of a master locksmith. He studied law at the University of Vienna and became a magistrate. In 1873, he founded a democratic association in Josefstadt and was elected to the Reichsrat. While initially affiliated with the Christian Social Party, he came into conflict with the party due to his support for the revolutions of 1848 as well as his opposition to Karl Lueger's Christian antisemitism. Kronawetter resigned his mandate in 1882, was re-elected in 1885, and appeared alongside Engelbert Pernerstorfer as a representative of the workers' movement on the Imperial Council.

Kronawetter was closely affiliated with the Social Democratic Party of Austria, although he never officially joined the party. By 1879, he advocated for universal suffrage, campaigned against corruption, supported self-determination for stateless nations, and supported separation of church and state as a radical anti-clerical.

According to German socialist activist and politician August Bebel, and later British historians Peter G. J. Pulzer and Richard J. Evans, Kronawetter was likely the originator of the phrase "Antisemitism is the socialism of fools", even though that phrase was attributed to Bebel or even to German philosopher, political theorist and economist Karl Marx.

The first known usage of the phrase by Kronawetter was in a speech at an April, 1889, general meeting of the Margarethen District Electoral Association in Vienna. On the following day, April 24, 1889, a report of the speech was published in Neue Freie Presse:

We democrats are called traitors, Jews and lackeys of Jews. We are none of these, but neither are we the boot-polishers of Liechtenstein, slaves to priests, or hypocrites who, as democrats, lie prostrate and swivel-eyed as we receive the telegraphed blessing of the Pope. (Stormy applause.) Antisemitism is nothing but the socialism of the idiot of Vienna (loud laughter) – for what reasonable person can believe that the future will be better if people are led back into the darkness of the Middle Ages?

By the 1890s, that phrase was widely used among German social democrats.
