= Emil Lederer =

German economist and sociologist (1882–1939)

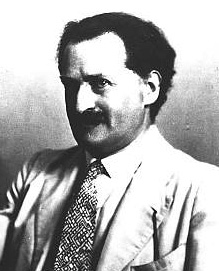
- Born: 22 July 1882; Plzeň, Bohemia, Austria-Hungary
- Died: 29 May 1939 (aged 56); New York City, United States

Academic background
- Education: University of Vienna; LMU Munich

Academic work
- Discipline: Economics, sociology
- Institutions: Humboldt University of Berlin

Emil Lederer (22 July 1882 – 29 May 1939) was a Bohemian-born German economist and sociologist.

Purged from his position at Humboldt University of Berlin in 1933 for being Jewish, Lederer fled into exile. He helped establish the "University in Exile" at the New School in New York City.

== Biography ==
Lederer was born in 1882 to a Jewish merchant family. He studied law and national economy at Vienna University. Among others, his professors were Heinrich Lammasch, Karl Theodor von Inama-Sternegg, Franz von Juraschek, Carl Menger, Friedrich von Wieser, Eugen von Böhm-Bawerk and Eugen von Philippovich, while Ludwig von Mises, Joseph Schumpeter, Felix Somary, Otto Bauer, Alfred Sohn-Rethel and Rudolf Hilferding were among his fellow students.

In 1905, Lederer received Dr. iur. in Vienna, and in 1911 Dr. rer. pol. at the Ludwig-Maximilians-Universität München (LMU). The next year, he habilitated at Ruprecht Karl University of Heidelberg with his thesis "Die Privatangestellten in der modernen Wirtschaftsentwicklung".

In 1918, he was appointed assistant professor by Heidelberg University, but Lederer remained in Austria until 1920. In early 1919, he was appointed member of the German Socialisation Commission in Vienna, along with Hilferding and Schumpeter.

At Heidelberg University, Lederer became assistant professor for social politics in 1920, and a full professor in the same year. From 1923 to 1925 he held lectures as guest professor at Tokyo Imperial University. From 1923 to 1931, Lederer and Alfred Weber were directors of the Institute for Social- and State Sciences. In 1931, he succeeded Werner Sombart at the German Faculty for national economy and finance sciences at Humboldt University of Berlin.

As was the case with almost all so-called "Heidelberger economists", Lederer was suspended by the Nazis on 14 April 1933 according to the Gesetz zur Wiederherstellung des Berufsbeamtentums until a final decision would be made. This affected all activities in connection with his offices. The salary was to be paid fully in the meantime. In addition, university members apparently had denunciated Lederer for being a member of the Social Democratic Party of Germany (since 1925) and for being "non-Aryan".

Lederer escaped to London, afterwards coming to the United States, where (in 1933) he co-founded the "University in Exile" at The New School for Social Research in New York City, which would become the Graduate Faculty of Political and Social Science. Emil Lederer was its first Dean until his sudden death in 1939, in the aftermath of an operation.

== Work ==
Lederer, who connected economics and sociology, was considered the most important supporter of interdisciplinary social sciences in Heidelberg.

His efforts as a democratic socialist are reflected by his range of topics, including the theory of economy and class structure analysis. Lederer, who published the social democratic theory magazine "Die Neue Zeit", was influenced by Karl Marx and Joseph Schumpeter. He did not support an unregulated free market: he examined the inefficiencies of monopolies, and partially denounced the positive effects of technical progress according to his stagnation theorem.

== Literary works ==
- Die Veränderungen im Klassenaufbau während des Krieges, 1918
- Die Soziologie der Gewalt, 1919
- Grundzüge der ökonomischen Theorie, 1922
- Aufriss der ökonomischen Theorie, 1931
- Technischer Fortschritt und Arbeitslosigkeit, 1931
- The state of the masses, 1939
