= Gallspach =

- Municipality
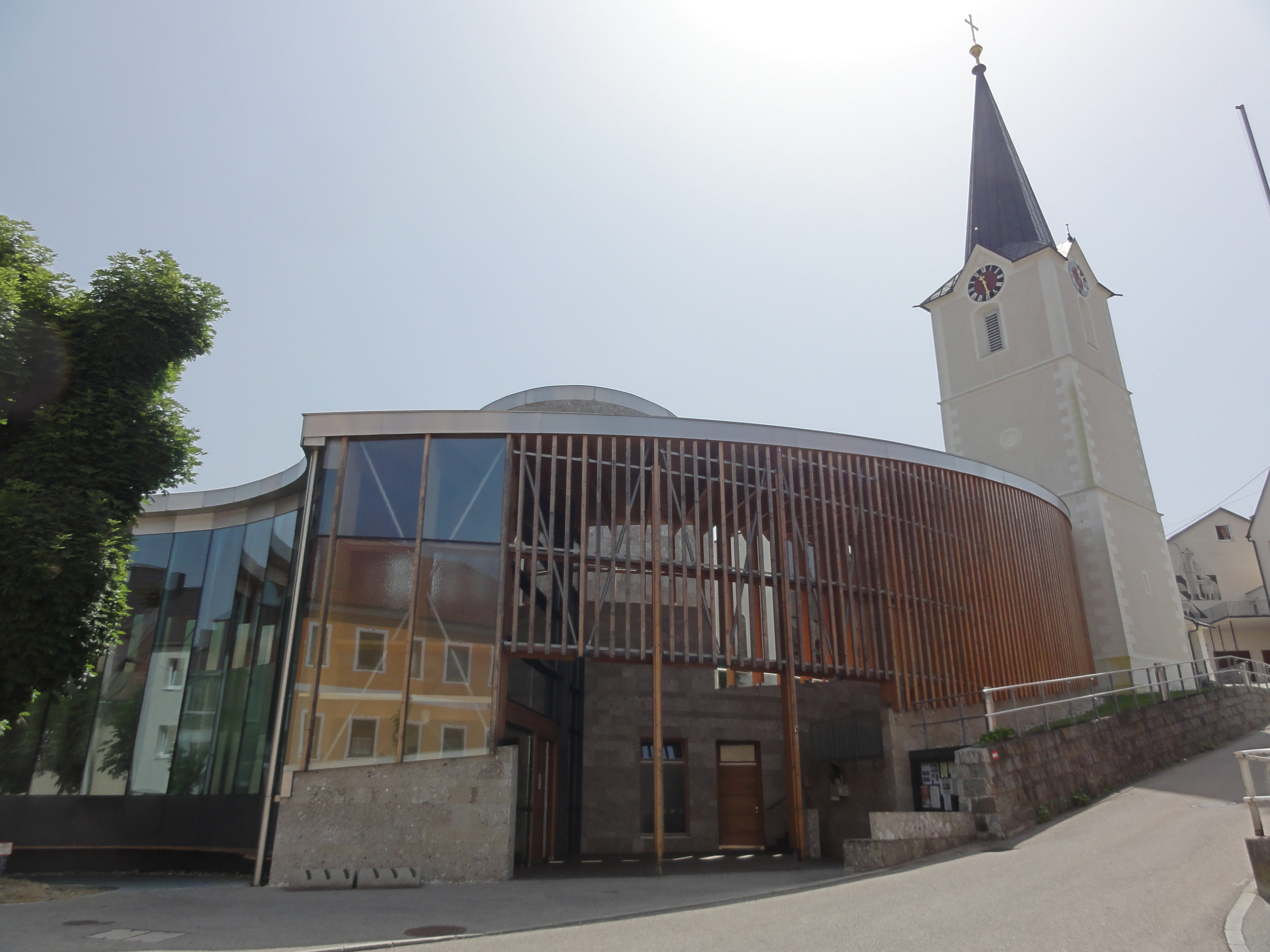

- Coat of arms

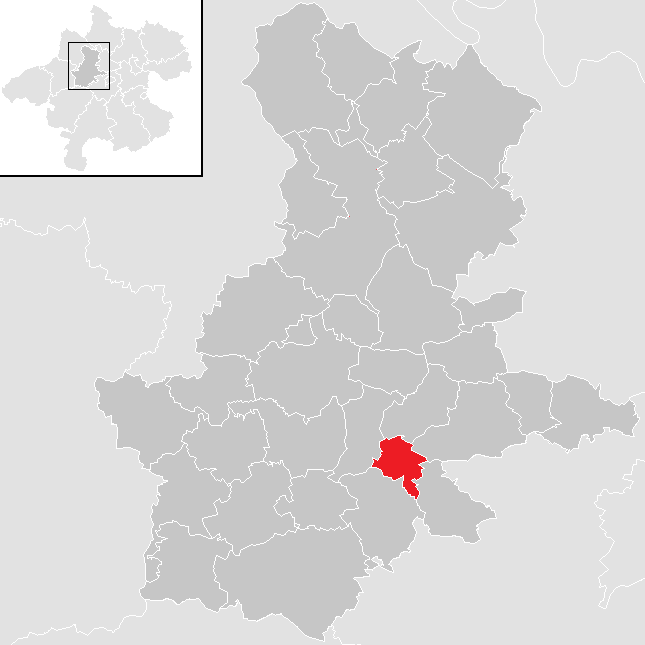
- Location in the district

- Location within Austria
- Coordinates: 48°12′24″N 13°48′52″E
- Country: Austria
- State: Upper Austria
- District: Grieskirchen

Government
  - Mayor: Dieter Lang (FPÖ)

Area
  - Total: 6.18 km^{2} (2.39 sq mi)
- Elevation: 365 m (1,198 ft)

Population (2018-01-01)
  - Total: 2,772
  - Density: 449/km^{2} (1,160/sq mi)
- Time zone: UTC+1 (CET)
  - Summer (DST): UTC+2 (CEST)
- Postal code: 4713
- Area code: 07248
- Vehicle registration: GR
- Website: www.gallspach.ooe.gv.at

Gallspach is a municipality and spa in the district of Grieskirchen in the Austrian state of Upper Austria. The center of the municipality is the market town Gallspach. It comprises also the following villages: Enzendorf, Gferedt, Niederndorf, Schützendorf, Thall, Thongraben, Vornwald and Wies.

== Population ==
Historical population

Year	Pop.	±%
1951	1,833	—
1961	1,675	−8.6%
1971	1,867	+11.5%
1981	2,014	+7.9%
1991	2,462	+22.2%

Year	Pop.	±%
2001	2,575	+4.6%
2006	2,810	+9.1%
2016	2,843	+1.2%
2018	2,772	−2.5%

== History ==
In the Roman era the forested tract of Gallspach belonged to the area of the Colonia Aurelia Antoniana Ovilabis/(Wels), which became the capital of the province of Noricum Ripensis in the 4th century. Settlement started probably not before the 10th century. Until 1180 Gallspach belonged to the dukedom of Bavaria, afterwards to the dukedom of Styria/Steiermark and since 1254 to the dukedom of Austria. As a consequence of the peace treaty of Schönbrunn in 1809/10 Gallspach came under French administration and from 1810 to 1816 large parts of the Gallspach municipality went to the kingdom of Bavaria. In 1343/44 a separate parish was founded by Eberhard from Wallsee. In 1439 Gallspach was given the right to hold a regular market every week on wednesday by king Albert II of Germany, which was confirmed in 1442 by emperor Frederick III. In the 16th century Gallspach became a centre of Protestantism, which was promoted by the Geymann (Geumann) family (the Gallspach landlords from 1354-1633). In the 18th and the first half of the 19th century a large number of weavers and peddlers of haberdashery settled there. As of 1920 Gallspach developed as a well-known health resort. In September 1940 and two weeks before his solo flight to Scotland in 1941, Rudolf Hess, the Nazi Deputy Führer and later war criminal met there with Albrecht Haushofer, who probably encouraged him in his failed mission to negotiate peace with the United Kingdom. In 1992 a successful drilling for a thermal spring was carried out on the premises of the Zeileis health & thermal centre.

== Personalities related to Gallspach ==
- Johann (Hans) Geumann (about 1455-1533), second High Master of the Saint George's Knights Order with headquarters in Millstatt/Carinthia.
- Johann Georg Adam Reichsfreiherr von (baron of) Hoheneck (1669–1754), historian and genealogist.
- Josef Starzengruber (1806–1877), medical doctor, founder of the health resort Bad Hall in Upper Austria.
- Matthias Friedwagner (1861–1940), university professor (romanic philology), 1900–1911 university of Czernowitz (1910/11 rector), 1912–1928 Johann Wolfgang Goethe-University Frankfurt/Main.
- Valentin Zeileis (1873–1939), physicist, founder of the electro-physical institut (health & therapy centre) in Gallspach. Married with Friederike Zeileis (née Mautner von Markhof)
- Erwin Burgstaller (born 1962), sculptor.

== Sights ==
- Moated castle, first mentioned 1343, building of the 16th to 18th century with a prominent round tower.
- Roman Catholic parish church of St. Catherine (until 1638 St. Bartholomew), first mentioned 1343, epitaphs from the 14th to the 18th century; the nave was newly constructed in 2005.
- Baroque Marian column from the end of the 17th century.
