= Gladstone Professor of Government =

The Gladstone Professorship of Government is located at All Souls College at the University of Oxford. It was instituted in memory of William Ewart Gladstone. Initially the chair was described as the Gladstone Professorship of Political Theory and Institutions. In 1941 this was changed to Government and Public Administration. More recently the title has changed to Professor of Government. The professorship has never been held by a woman. Its past holders have been:

- Sir Kenneth Clinton Wheare, 1944-1956
- Max Beloff, 1957-1974
- Samuel Finer, 1974-1982
- Peter Pulzer, 1985-1996
- Alfred C. Stepan, 1996-1999 before he re-joined Columbia University
- Christopher Hood, 2001–2014. He worked mainly on executive government and the politics of public services.
- Stathis Kalyvas, 2018-.
