= Josef Popper-Lynkeus =

Austrian scholar and author (1838–1921)

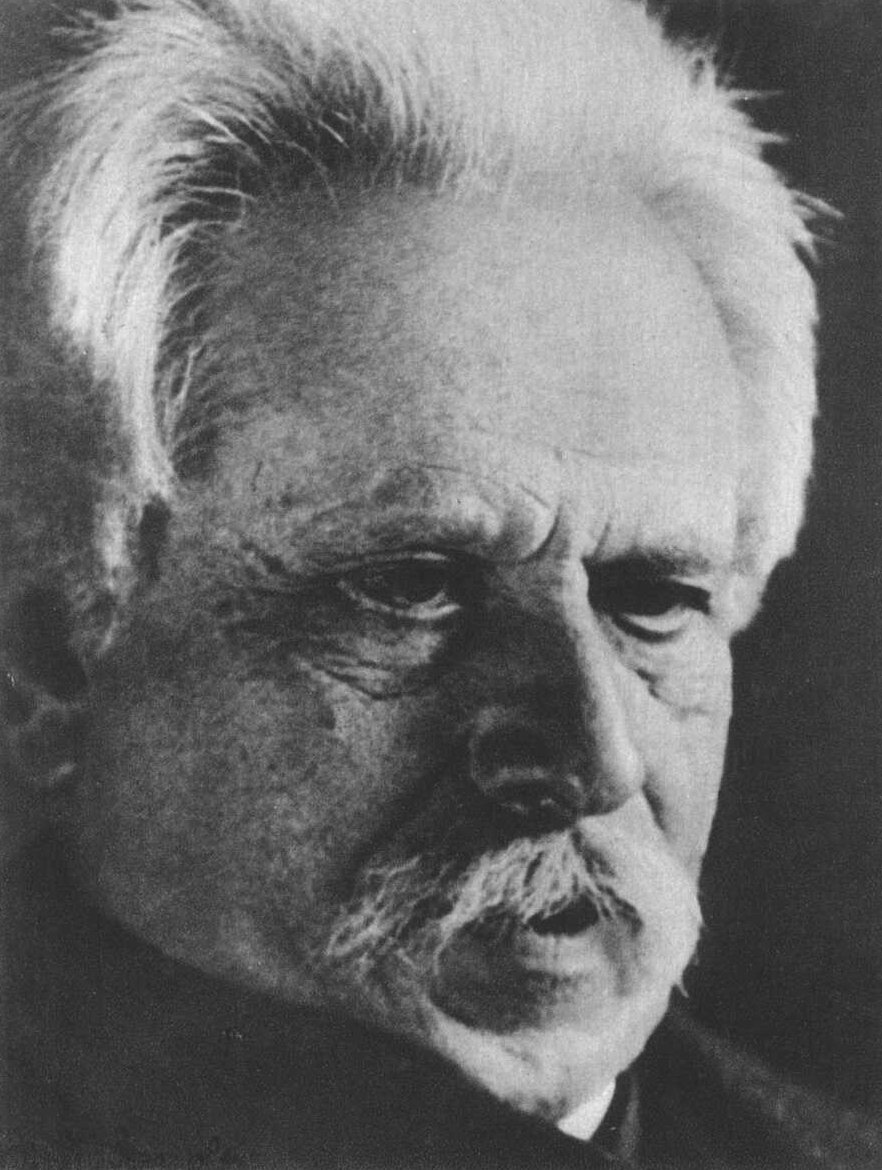
- Josef Popper-Lynkeus in 1917
- Born: February 21, 1838; Kolín, Bohemia, Austria-Hungary
- Died: December 22, 1921 (aged 83); Vienna, Austria
- Occupations: Philosopher, writer, translator
- Political party: Social Political Party
- Relatives: Karl Popper (nephew)

Josef Popper-Lynkeus (21 February 1838 – 22 December 1921) was an Austrian scholar, writer, and inventor. Josef Popper was born in the Jewish quarter in Kolín, Bohemia (now Czech Republic). He was the uncle of Austrian-British philosopher Karl Popper.

== Early life ==
Josef was born to an impoverished Jewish family of tradespeople who placed a high value on education. After a highly religious early education he was sent to the Polytechnic in Prague. Four years later he started at the Imperial Polytechnikum, Vienna, to study Mathematics, Physics and Astronomy. However, despite doing well, the Concordat of 1855 enabled the Vatican to impose restrictions to Jews, and so he could only support himself by taking on low paid menial work.

== Inventions ==
After graduating from the Vienna Polytechnikum, Popper-Lynkeus worked for two years as an engineer in a private firm. From 1862 – 1866, he tutored and occasionally lectured, and from 1867 - 1897, he privately pursued various inventions. In 1868, he contrived a system of gaskets to prevent the buildup of scale on the inner walls of steam boilers. This and some other inventions prepared the ground for his work in engineering, physics, and social and moral philosophy – independently of establishment and closed academic groups.

== Ideas ==
Popper-Lynkeus's ideas were innovative for his time. In engineering, he thought of the possibility of electric power transmission, the conversion of mechanical energy of waterfalls and rising tides into electrical power (1862). In physics, he thought of the mass-energy relation (1883) and the idea of a quantum of energy (1884), the principle of unavoidable distortion of the parameters of objects under investigation by measuring instruments. In psychology, he thought of the interpretations of dreams based on analysis of the conflict between the social consciousness of an individual and his or her animal instincts (short story Dreaming like Waking, 1889). Several years before Theodor Herzl, in the work Prince Bismarck and anti-Semitism (1886), Popper-Lynkeus came to the conclusion that the Jews could be saved from anti-Semitism only if they possessed their own state. He considered creation of such a state an urgent need, and that the type of regime in the beginning did not matter, that even a monarchy would be satisfactory.

The aforementioned short story was included in the collection of philosophical stories under the common title Fantasies of a Realist, which was published in 1899 and ran through twenty editions. Since then, Popper-Lynkeus used the pseudonym Lynkeus – after the keen-sighted watchman from the Argonauts' ship, appearing also in Goethe's Faust. Three of the many ideas Popper-Lynkeus suggested in this collection were:

- Influence of marching music on the masses;
- On the expediency of some punishments;
- On the right of every individual to exist.

Popper-Lynkeus mentions the great power that music has over the masses. He stated that marching music often serves as a support of tyranny, transforming the masses into a paste anything can be made from. This idea of Popper-Lynkeus is similar to an idea of Leo Tolstoy, who said, "Those who want to have more slaves should compose more marching music."

In the sphere of justice, Popper-Lynkeus maintained that publicity should be the main punishment for committing a crime, and only recidivists should be isolated. According to Popper-Lynkeus, the right to exist is the primary and natural right of any human being, and for this reason, the state should not be allowed to send an individual to death without his or her consent. He was an advocate of compulsory military service, but provided that only volunteers would be sent to battlefields.

== Social system ==
Popper-Lynkeus designed his own social system, which ensures that all individuals are provided with goods of primary necessity, and explains it in a series of works beginning from The Right to Live and the Duty to Die (1878) and ending with The Universal Civil Service as a Solution of a Social Problem (1912).

According to Popper-Lynkeus, society has a duty to provide its members with goods of prime necessity – food, clothes, and housing – and also with the services of prime necessity – public health care, upbringing, and education. However, every healthy society member in the framework of labor service would participate in activities that do not require higher or secondary special education and that are related to the creation of material foundations of national economy (e.g. mining, forest exploitation, farm work, construction work). He or she would also be engaged in the manufacturing of goods and providing basic services.

In Popper-Lynkeus's opinion, a just human society would arise not as a result of a violent social upheaval, but as an outcome of the process of persuasion and common consensus. In this society, every individual in the course of his or her life would go through four social-age stages (the third stage out of them may be omitted): 1) educational (up to age 18); 2) natural-economic (men up to 30 years, women up to 25); 3) financial-economic; 4) pension. Every society member would define the boundary between the last two stages at his or her own discretion.

During the second of these stages, all healthy society members take part in labor service and on this ground become entitled to obtain basic necessities in the course of their entire life free of charge.

At the third stage, those society members who wish to work may be involved in the financial and economic activity in one of the state or private sectors (in the latter case either as hired employees or as free entrepreneurs). They receive payment for their labor, and this enables them to purchase goods and get access to non-basic services.

During the last two of the aforementioned social-age stages, any individual is free. This cannot be said of the first two stages, when people earn their freedom and grow up to become fully aware of it. As Popper-Lynkeus remarked, with scientific and technological advancement, the duration of the second stage would gradually decrease. Simultaneously, the scope of the concept goods and services of primary necessity would expand.

Among the conditions for creating a social system, according to Popper-Lynkeus, is the necessity to foster in the rising generation on the first social-age stage such traits as love and respect to other people, love to work and aversion to false needs, and habits of rational use of leisure time.

== Influence ==
Among the admirers of Popper-Lynkeus were physicists Albert Einstein and Ernst Mach; philosophers Martin Buber and Hugo Bergman; chemist Wilhelm Ostwald; mathematician Richard von Mises; statistician Karl Ballod (Kārlis Balodis); physiologist Theodor Baer; psychologist Sigmund Freud; social scientist Otto Neurath; writers Max Brod, Stefan Zweig, and Arthur Schnitzler; and the founder of the Zionist Revisionist movement, Ze'ev Jabotinsky.

Jabotinsky pointed out at the five constituents of the Popper-Lynkeus minimal program, Food, clothes, housing, health services, and education. Calling lack of any of these factors a "hole," he said, "Human society is similar to the kindergarten. In the kindergarten there are five holes, according to these five constituents. The children playing in the kindergarten are in danger of falling into one of them. What does the Prussian guard do? He erects shields with such inscriptions as 'Do not go to the right!' or 'Do not go to the left!' Following Popper-Lynkeus, I propose to cover up all these holes and give the children opportunity to play freely as they want."

On 21 February 1918, on the 80th anniversary of Josef Popper-Lynkeus birth, his followers, physician and psychologist Fritz Wittels and writer Walter Markus, established the organization Universal Food Service in Vienna. For several years, this organization published a bulletin under the same name. It functioned for 20 years and was disbanded at the time of the annexation of Austria into Germany.

Josef Popper-Lynkeus died on 22 December 1921. In recognition of his merits and accomplishments, the street in Vienna where he lived during the last years of his life was named after him.

Einstein later penned a tribute to Popper-Lynkeus in the German scientific periodical Die Naturwissenschaften, writing:

"Popper-Lynkæus was more than a brilliant engineer and writer. He was one of the few out-standing personalities who embody the conscience of a generation. He has drummed it into us that society is responsible for the fate of every individual and shown us a way to translate the consequent obligation of the community into fact. The community or State was no fetish to him; he based its right to demand sacrifices of the individual entirely on its duty to give the individual personality a chance of harmonious development." This was later republished in his book, The World as I See It.

On the evening of the 150th anniversary of Josef Popper's birth, a fund for researching his thought and propagation of his ideas was established at the Johann Wolfgang Goethe University in Frankfurt am Main.

In July 2007, the Tel-Aviv–Jaffa municipality decided to name one of the streets in Jaffa after Popper-Lynkeus.

== Bibliography ==
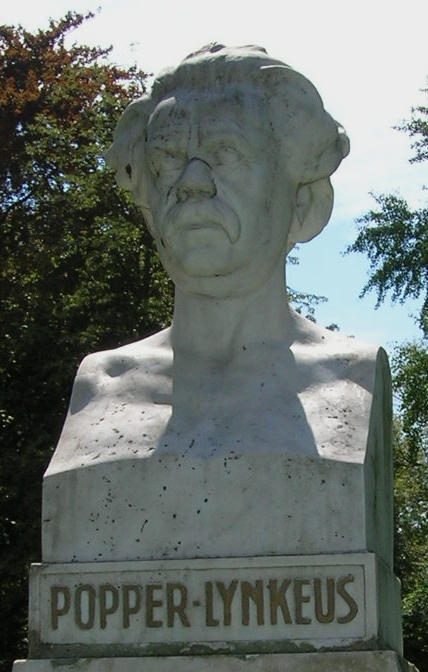
Bust of Josef Popper-Lynkeus, sculpted by Hugo Taglang, in the gardens of the Rathaus, Vienna

Josef Popper-Lynkeus wrote all his works in German. A partial list of his works, including those published after his death, is as follows:

- Moral World Order (1877);
- The Ethical and Cultural Meaning of Technological Progress (1886);
- Voltaire (1905);
- On the Physical Foundations of Electric Power Transmission (1905);
- Flight of Machines and Birds. A Historical-Critical Aero Technical In-vestigation (1911);
- Autobiography (1917),
- War, Military Service, State Legislation (1921);
- Philosophy of Criminal Law (1924);
- I and Social Conscience (1924);
- On the Main Notions of Philosophy and Certainty of Our Knowledge (1924).

German

- Das Recht zu leben und Die Pflicht zu sterben - Sozialphilosophische Betrachtungen anknüpfend an die Bedeutung Voltaires für die neuere Zeit. Wien-Leipzig: R. Löwit Verlag 1878–1924
- Phantasien eines Realisten. Dresden: Carl Reissner 1899
- Selbstbiographie. Im Anhang 3 Briefe von Julius Robert Mayer; Poppers Arbeit über J. R. Mayers 'Mechanik der Wärme; Historisches zur elektrischen Kraftübertragung; Einige Besprechungen der 'Phantasien eines Realisten' und chronologisches Verzeichnis der Schriften des Verfassers u.a. Leipzig: Verlag Unesma 1917
- Krieg, Wehrpflicht und Staatsverfassung. Wien-Berlin-Leipzig-München: Rikola Verlag 1921
- Die allgemeine Nährpflicht. Im Auftrage des Verfassers nach seinem Tod herausgegeben von Margit Ornstein, Wien-Leipzig-München: Rikola Verlag 1923
- Über Religion. Im Auftrage des Verfassers aus seinem literarischen Nachlasse herausgegeben von Margit Ornstein, Wien-Leipzig: R. Löwit Verlag 1924
- Fürst Bismarck und der Antisemitismus. Wien-Leipzig: R. Löwit Verlag 1925
- Voltaire. Im Auftrage des Verfassers herausgegeben von Margit Ornstein, Wien-Leipzig: R. Löwit Verlag 1925
- Gespräche. mitgeteilt von Margit Ornstein und Heinrich Löwy, Wien-Leipzig: R. Löwit Verlag 1925
