= Emma Adler =

Austrian journalist and writer

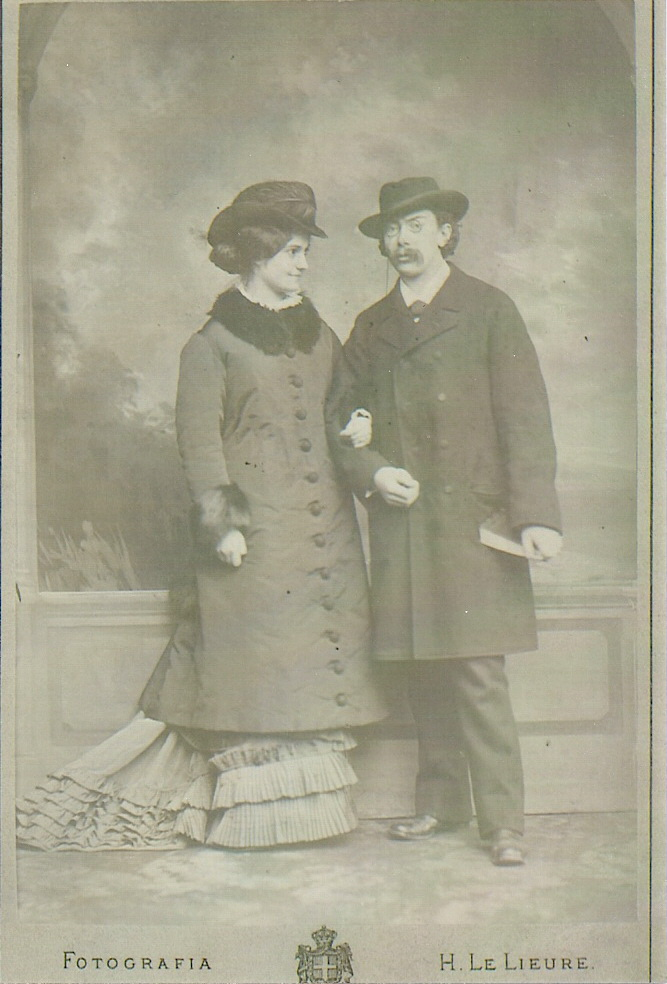
Emma and Victor Adler (1878)

Emma Adler (née, Braun; pen names, Marion Lorm and Helene Erdmann; 20 May 1858 – 23 February 1935) was an Austrian fin de siècle journalist and writer.

== Biography ==
She is known for works of fiction, historical novels, translations, as well as her correspondence with Karl Kautsky. She was a socialist who, with other Jewish writers of the time, such as Hedwig Dohm, Bertha Pappenheim, and Hedwig Lachmann, "combined political activity with artistic creativity". Adler was the publisher of the Arbeiterinnen-Zeitung.

Adler was born in Debrecen, Austrian Empire in 1858. She was the sister of Heinrich Braun; and the wife of Victor Adler, a physician and politician who founded the Social Democratic Party of Austria in Austria. They married in 1878, and had three children, Friedrich (born 1878), Marie (born 1881), Karl (born 1885). She dealt with severe depressive episodes during periods of her life, and died in Zürich, Switzerland in 1935.

== Selected works ==
- Goethe und Frau v. Stein, 18871897.
- Marion Lorm (Pseudonym), translation: Choderlos de Laclos: Gefährliche Liebschaften, 1899
- Die berühmten Frauen der französischen Revolution 1789–1795, 1906
- Erinnerungen 1887–1892–1912, in: Gedenkbuch: 20 Jahre Österreichische Arbeiterinnenbewegung, 1912
- Feierabend. Ein Buch für die Jugend, 1902
- Neues Buch der Jugend, 1912
- Kochschule, 1915

== See also ==
- Lists of writers
