= Friedrich Adler (politician) =

Austrian politician (1879–1960)

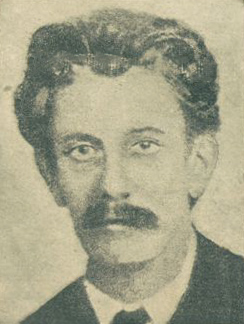
Friedrich Adler, about 1917

Friedrich Wolfgang "Fritz" Adler (9 July 1879 – 2 January 1960) was an Austrian socialist politician, physicist, philosopher and journalist. He is perhaps best known for his assassination of Minister-President Karl von Stürgkh in 1916.

== Early years ==
Friedrich Wolfgang Adler was born into a Jewish family in Vienna, the son of politician Victor Adler (1852–1918), founder of the Austrian Social Democratic Workers' Party (SDAP), and his wife Emma, née Braun (1858–1935), sister of the German publisher Heinrich Braun. Following his father's wishes, he studied chemistry, physics and mathematics at the ETH Zurich, where he became a close friend of Albert Einstein.

== Political career ==
He committed himself to the Social Democratic Party of Switzerland and in 1897 joined the association of Austrian Social Democrats, working as a journalist. In 1910, Adler became editor of the newspaper Volksrecht in Zurich.

While still established at the ETH, Adler participated in the philosophical discussion about Ernst Mach, publishing Die Entdeckung der Weltelemente (zu E. Machs 70. Geburtstag) - The Discovery of the World-Elements (On the Occasion of E. Mach's 70th Birthday) published in Der Kampf in 1908. Mach also shared Adler's socialist views and was on good personal terms with his father Viktor. Adler's Mach book was hostilely cited by Vladimir Lenin in Materialism and Empirio-criticism, who called Adler a "naïve university lecturer". This was part of Lenin's attack on the Russian Machists. In 1909/10 he was being considered to chair the physics department, but deferred to Einstein's superior expertise and lobbied for Einstein's appointment instead.

Adler was engaged in the international trade union movement and in 1911 he finally gave up his scientific activities to become the secretary-general of the SDAP in Vienna, an office he held until 1914. Together with the Austromarxist proponent Otto Bauer, he was editor of the magazine Der Kampf and became a spokesperson of the left wing of the party according to the ideas of the Second International. After the outbreak of World War I in 1914, he agitated particularly against the SDAP's policy of supporting the war.

== Assassination of Stürgkh ==
In his fight against the war policy of Austria-Hungary, Adler resorted to drastic measures. On 21 October 1916, in the dining room of the Viennese hotel Meissl & Schadn, he shot the Austrian minister-president Count Karl von Stürgkh three times with a pistol, killing him. The Social Democratic party organ Arbeiter-Zeitung called the assassination a "strange and incomprehensible" act, whereas left leaning German-language-newspapers outside the censorship of Germany and Austria, in neutral Switzerland, attributed his deed to an understandable matter of last resort against an anti-democratic tyrant, who had successfully blocked the Austrian parliament from convening since 1913. After a period when attempts were made to avoid a trial by declaring Adler insane, he was brought to court in May 1917 where he was able to publicly present the killing as a revolutionary action in the context of the case against the war as well as against 'reformist' Social Democrats like Karl Renner. Adler was sentenced to death, a sentence which was commuted by Emperor Charles I to 18 years imprisonment. During the last days of the war, Emperor Charles had him released from custody.

In the following dissolution of the Monarchy, Adler played a significant role as the leader of the Arbeiterräte (workers' councils) and as a member of the National Council of Austria. Though courted by the Communist Party, Adler stayed loyal to the Social Democrats and disclosed revolutionary attempts by the Communist International. Upon the death of his father on 11 November 1918, Friedrich Adler, together with his party fellows Otto Bauer and Julius Deutsch, paved the way for Karl Renner's German-Austrian government.

== Inter-war period ==
While the SDAP presidency passed to pragmatic Karl Seitz, who led the party into a coalition government with the Christian Social Party, Adler served as secretary of the International Working Union of Socialist Parties in 1921. He was subsequently active in the formation of the Labour and Socialist International, serving as secretary-general firstly jointly with Tom Shaw then on his own until 1940, witnessing the rise of Nazism.

The SDAP was already banned by the Dollfuss government upon the Austrian Civil War in 1934. After the Austrian Anschluss to Nazi Germany in March 1938, the functionaries around Otto Bauer and Joseph Buttinger moved to Brussels and later to Paris.

== World War II ==
Upon the 1940 Battle of France, the party leadership fled to London, while Adler together with Buttinger emigrated to New York City, where he established the Austrian Labor Committee in 1942.

In the 1943 Moscow Declarations, the Allied called for the re-establishment of a free Austria after the victory over Nazi Germany. Adler, who rejected the "reactionary" ideas of an Austrian nation, gradually retired from politics.

Back in Europe from 1946, Adler moved to Switzerland, where he edited his father Victor's exchange of letters with August Bebel and Karl Kautsky. He returned to Vienna once, to celebrate his father's centennial anniversary in 1952 and was received with full honours.

== Death and legacy ==
On 2 January 1960, Adler died in his home in Zurich, at the age of 80.

== Footnotes ==
Party political offices
Preceded by New position	Secretary of the Labour and Socialist International; 1923–1940; With: Tom Shaw (1923–1925)	Succeeded by Position abolished
