= Roštín =

- Municipality
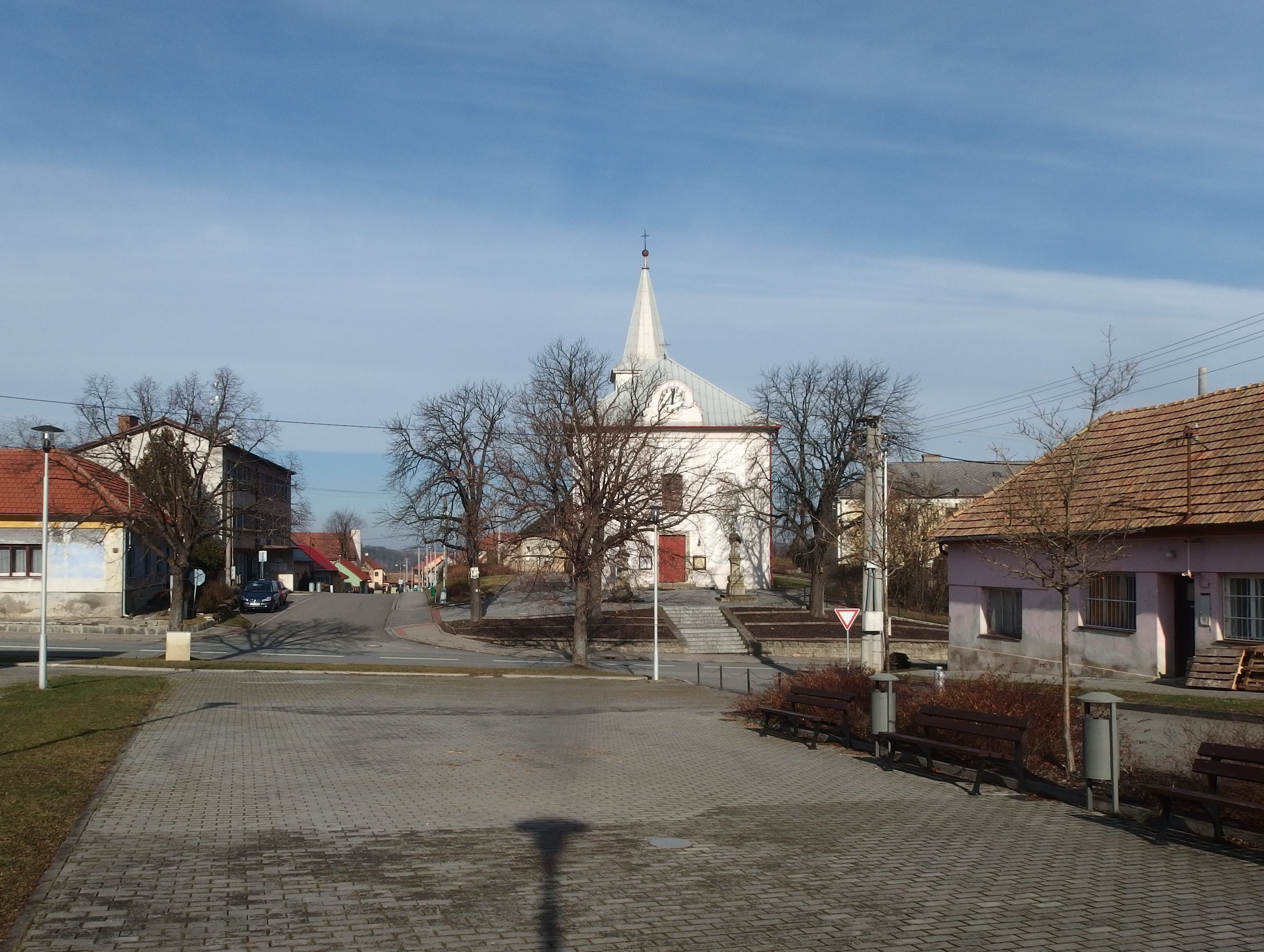
- Centre of Roštín

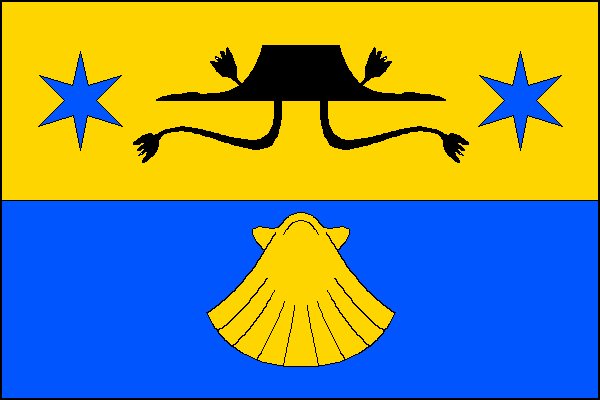
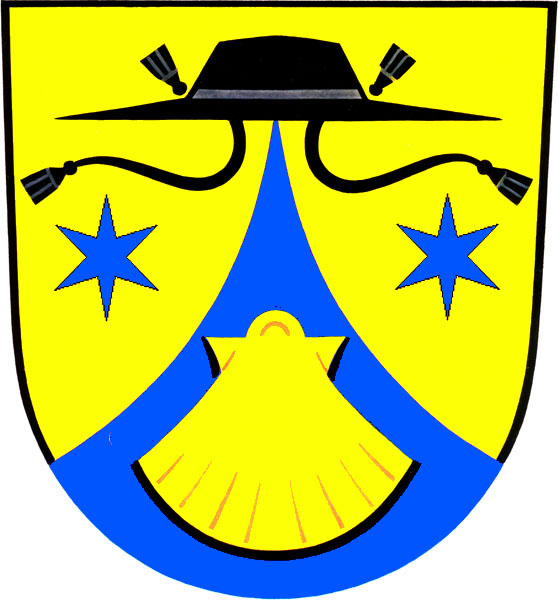
- Flag Coat of arms

- Location in the Czech Republic
- Coordinates: 49°11′20″N 17°17′10″E
- Country: Czech Republic
- Region: Zlín
- District: Kroměříž
- First mentioned: 1240

Area
  - Total: 18.03 km^{2} (6.96 sq mi)
- Elevation: 278 m (912 ft)

Population (2026-01-01)
  - Total: 692
  - Density: 38.4/km^{2} (99.4/sq mi)
- Time zone: UTC+1 (CET)
  - Summer (DST): UTC+2 (CEST)
- Postal code: 768 03
- Website: www.rostin.cz

Roštín is a municipality and village in Kroměříž District in the Zlín Region of the Czech Republic. It has about 700 inhabitants.

== Geography ==
Roštín is located about 14 kilometres (9 mi) southwest of Kroměříž and 27 km (17 mi) west of Zlín. The northwestern half of the municipality lies in the Litenčice Hills. The southeastern half is forested and lies in the Chřiby range. Brdo, the highest mountain of the whole Central Moravian Carpathians region with an elevation of 587 m (1,926 ft), is located in the municipality.

== History ==
The first written mention of Roštín is from 1240. In 1250, the village was mentioned as property of the monastery in Velehrad. The settlement was probably located around the Church of Saint James the Great. After it was destroyed during the Thirty Years' War, it was restored on its current location.

Throughout the centuries, it was owned by various lesser noblemen, and several times merged with neighbouring Cetechovice and then separated again.

== Demographics ==
Historical population

Year	Pop.	±%
1869	1,135	—
1880	1,121	−1.2%
1890	1,139	+1.6%
1900	1,143	+0.4%
1910	1,140	−0.3%

Year	Pop.	±%
1921	1,174	+3.0%
1930	1,065	−9.3%
1950	956	−10.2%
1961	994	+4.0%
1970	882	−11.3%

Year	Pop.	±%
1980	773	−12.4%
1991	677	−12.4%
2001	673	−0.6%
2011	693	+3.0%
2021	654	−5.6%

Source: Censuses

== Energy ==
Roštín’s municipal straw-fired district heating plant began trial operation in March 2002. It supplies heating and domestic hot water to homes and municipal buildings. Its main boiler has a thermal output of 4 MW and burns cereal and rapeseed straw supplied by local farmers. In 2025, the heating network served majority of households in the village.

In 2010, Roštín won the village category in the inaugural Biomas-liga competition, which assessed biomass heating projects.

== Transport ==
There are no railways or major roads passing through the municipality.

== Sights ==
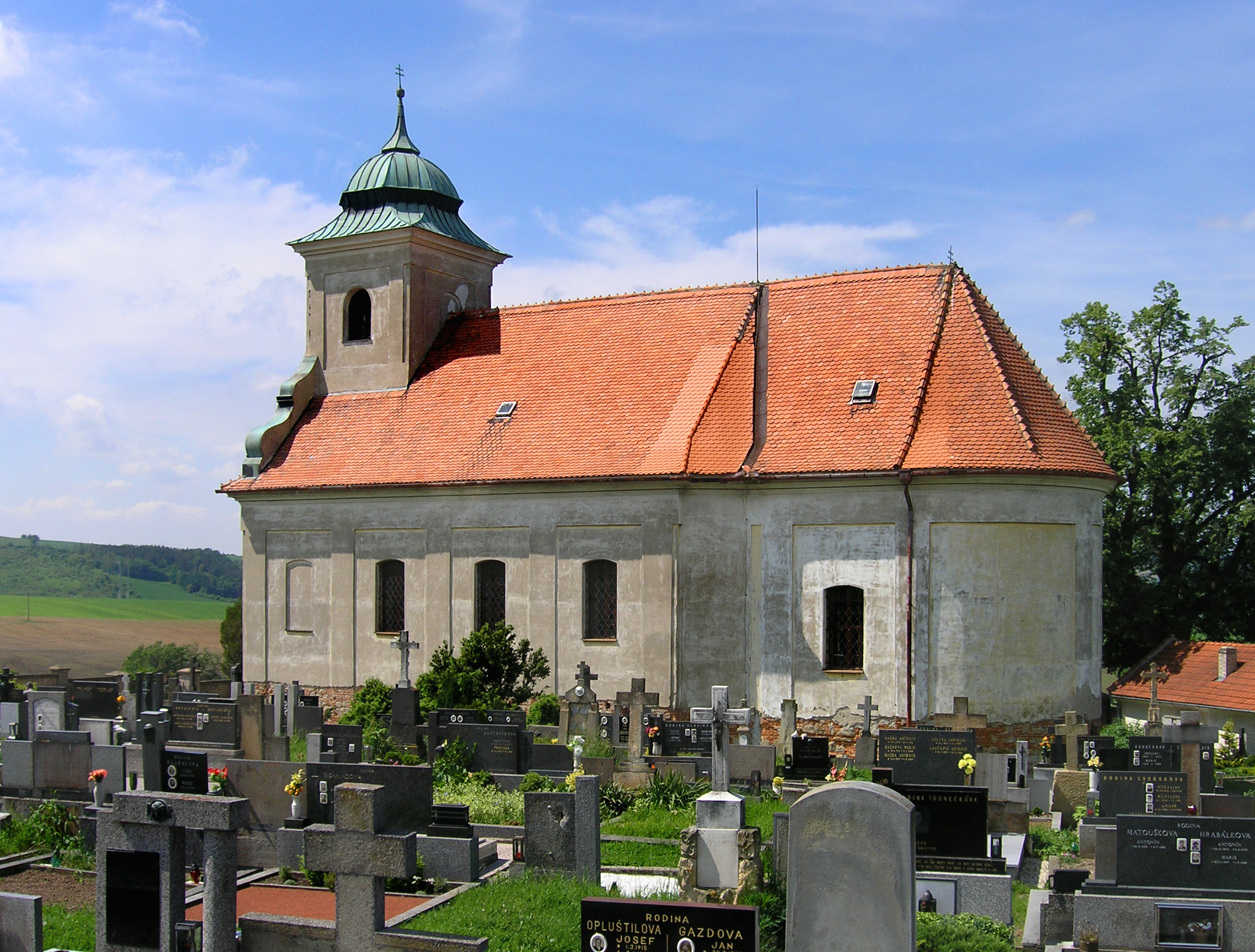
Church of Saint James the Great

The Church of Saint James the Great is a cemetery church, situated in the rural area of Roštín. The original church was first mentioned in 1193, earlier than the village. It was rebuilt several times. Its current form is from 1742.

The Church of Saint Anne was built in the centre of Roštín in 1847 to replace the remote church with its function. It was built on the site of a chapel from 1777.

There is a stone observation tower on the Brdo mountain.

== Notable people ==
- Heinrich Friedjung (1851–1920), Austrian historian and journalist

== Gallery ==
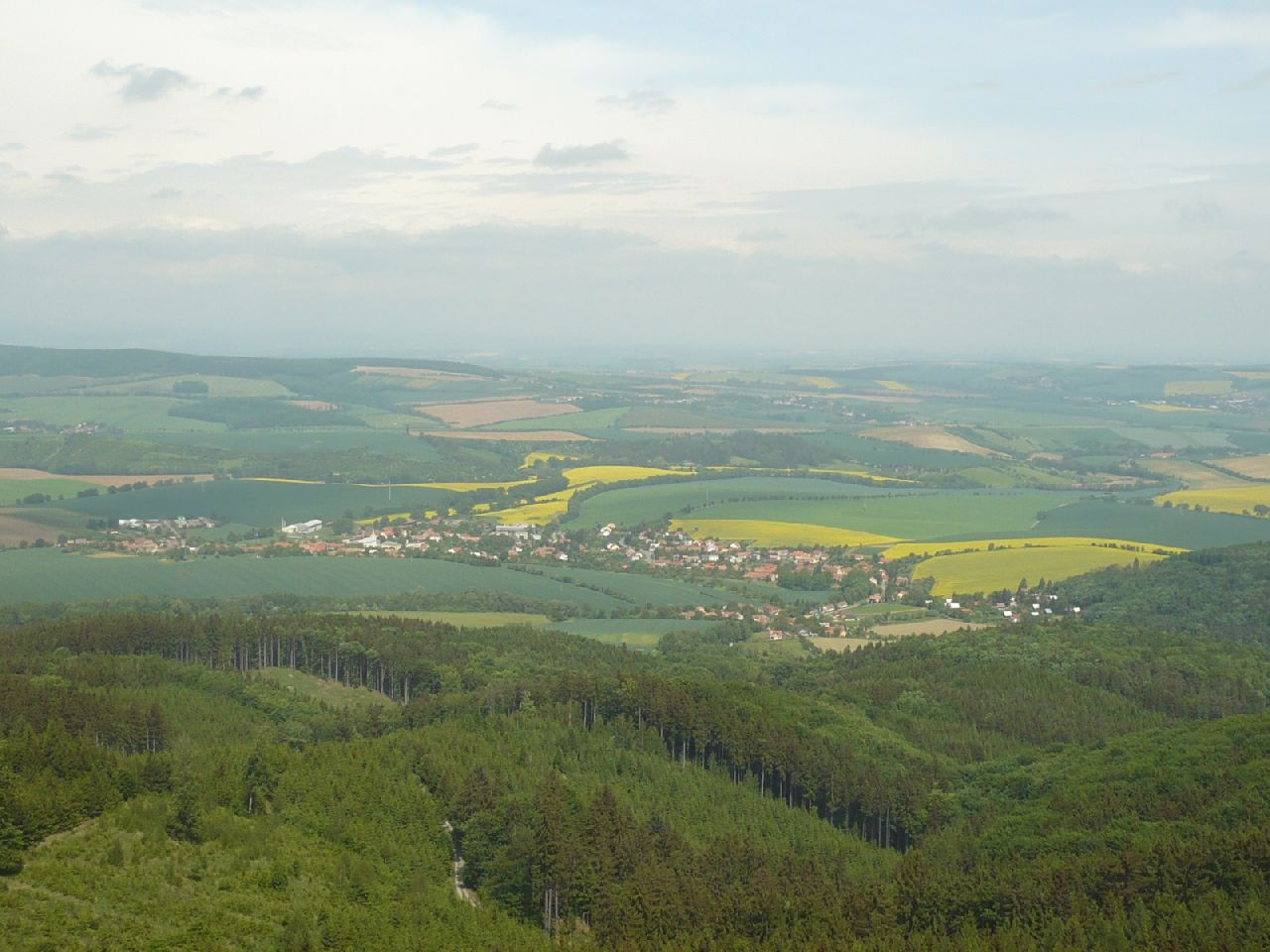
Roštín as seen from Brdo

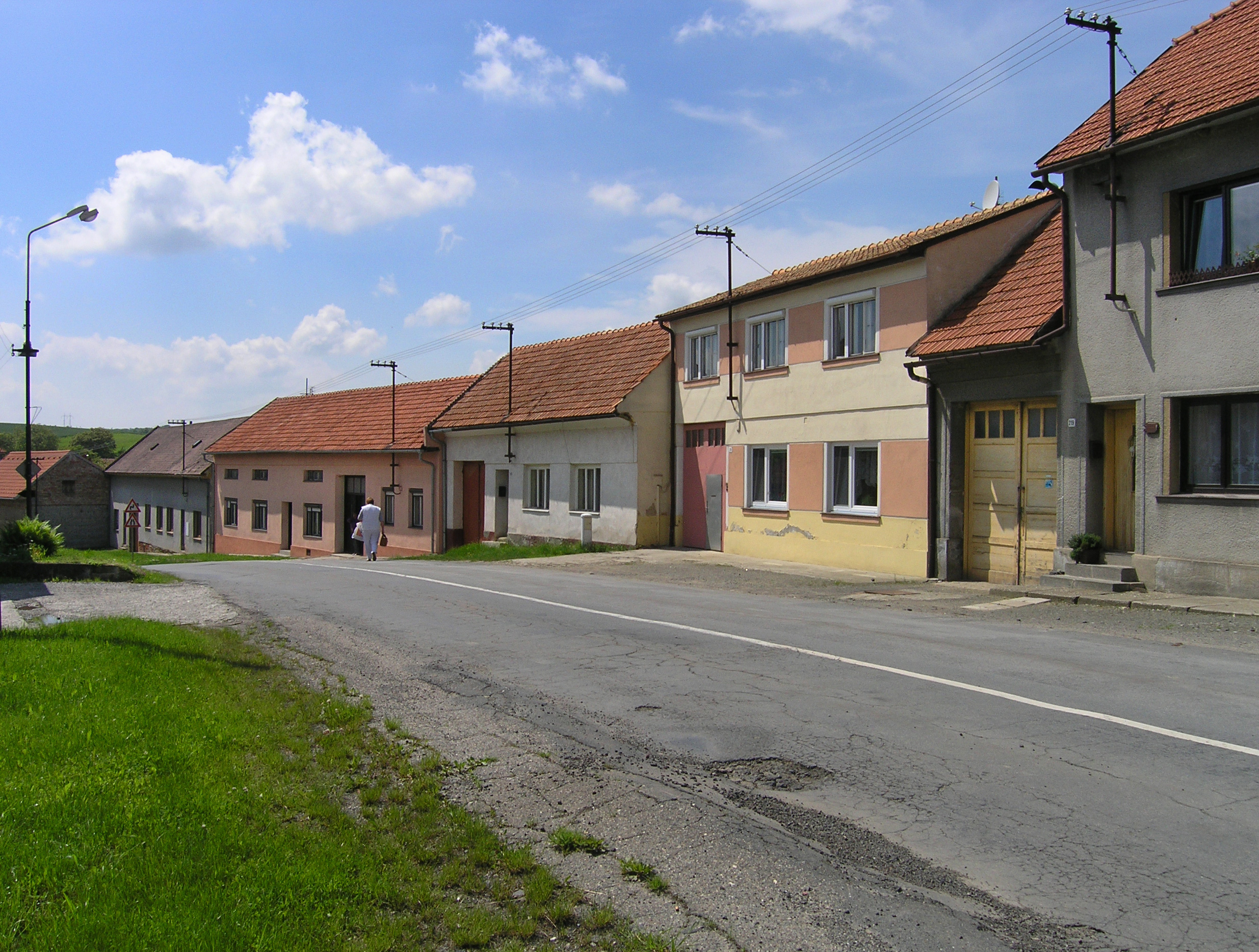
Main street

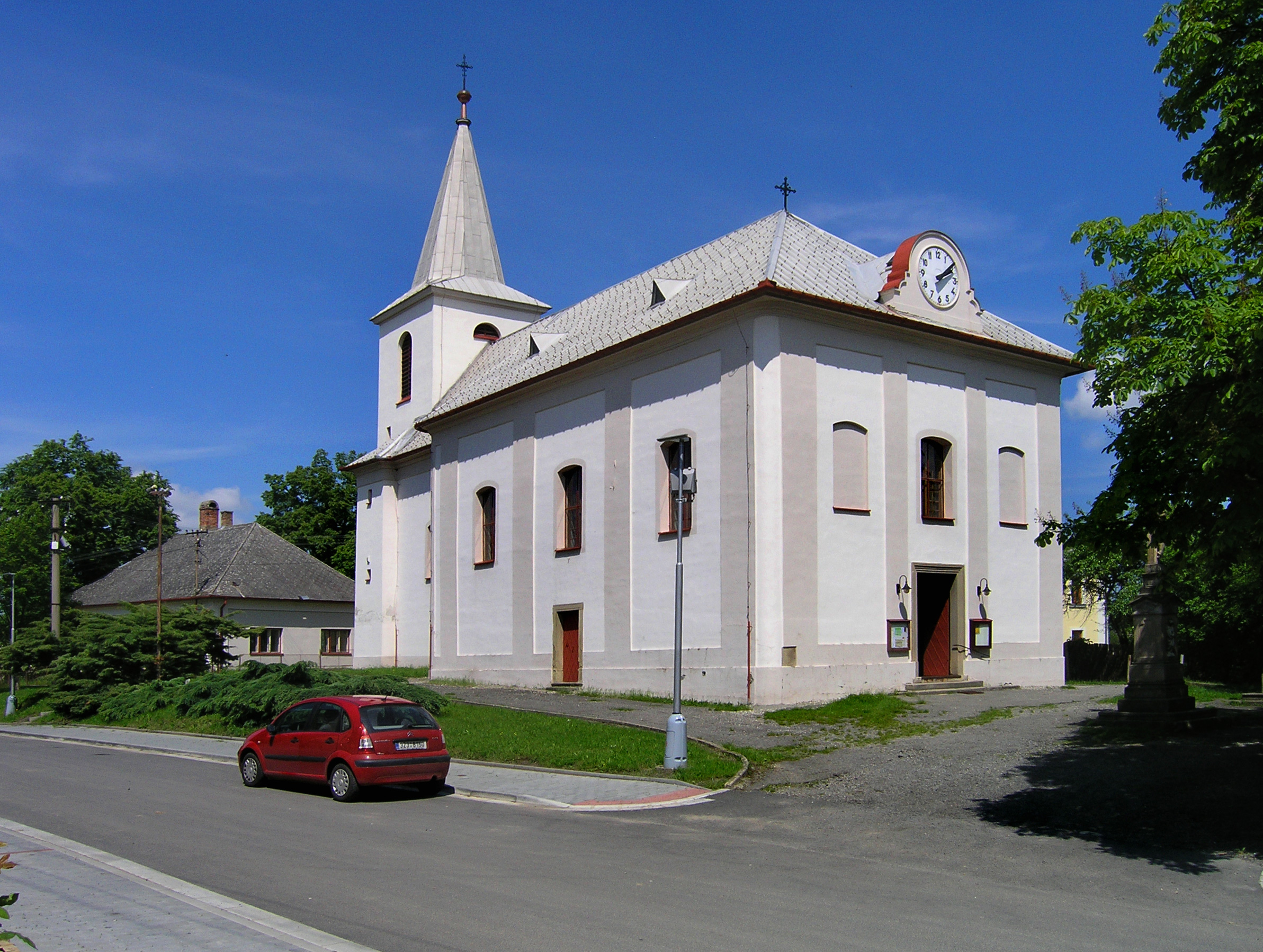
Church of Saint Anne
