= Michael Hainisch =

President of Austria from 1920 to 1928

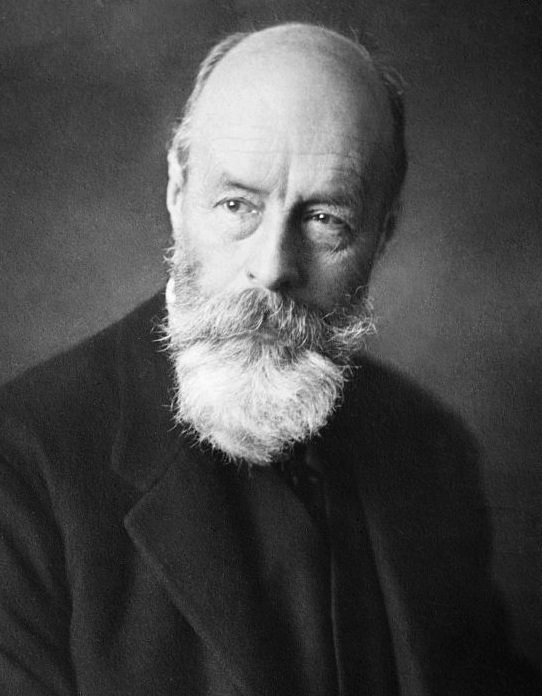

President of Austria
- In office 9 December 1920 – 10 December 1928
- Chancellor: Michael Mayr; Johann Schober; Walter Breisky; Ignaz Seipel; Rudolf Ramek
- Preceded by: Office established
- Succeeded by: Wilhelm Miklas

Minister of Commerce and Transport
- In office 26 September 1929 – 17 June 1930
- Chancellor: Johannes Schober
- Preceded by: Hans Schürff
- Succeeded by: Friedrich Schuster

Personal details
- Born: 15 August 1858 Aue bei Schottwien, Lower Austria, Austrian Empire
- Died: 26 February 1940 (aged 81) Vienna, Nazi Germany
- Party: Independent
- Other political affiliations: Social Political Party; Centrist Democrats
- Education: Leipzig University; University of Vienna

Michael Arthur Josef Jakob Hainisch (German: [ˈhaɪnɪʃ]; 15 August 1858 – 26 February 1940) was an Austrian politician who served as the first president of Austria from 1920 to 1928, after the fall of the monarchy at the end of World War I.

== Origins ==
Hainisch was born and named after his father, who was a factory owner. His mother Marianne Hainisch was a leader in the suffrage movement.

He started as a lawyer and an official of the Treasury and of the Education Department, but then retired to his estates in Lower Austria and Styria, where he carried on model farming, became a leader of the Austrian branch of the Fabian movement, and one of the founders of the Central People's Library. In later years, he moved away from radical socialism to become a conservative agrarian.

== Presidency ==
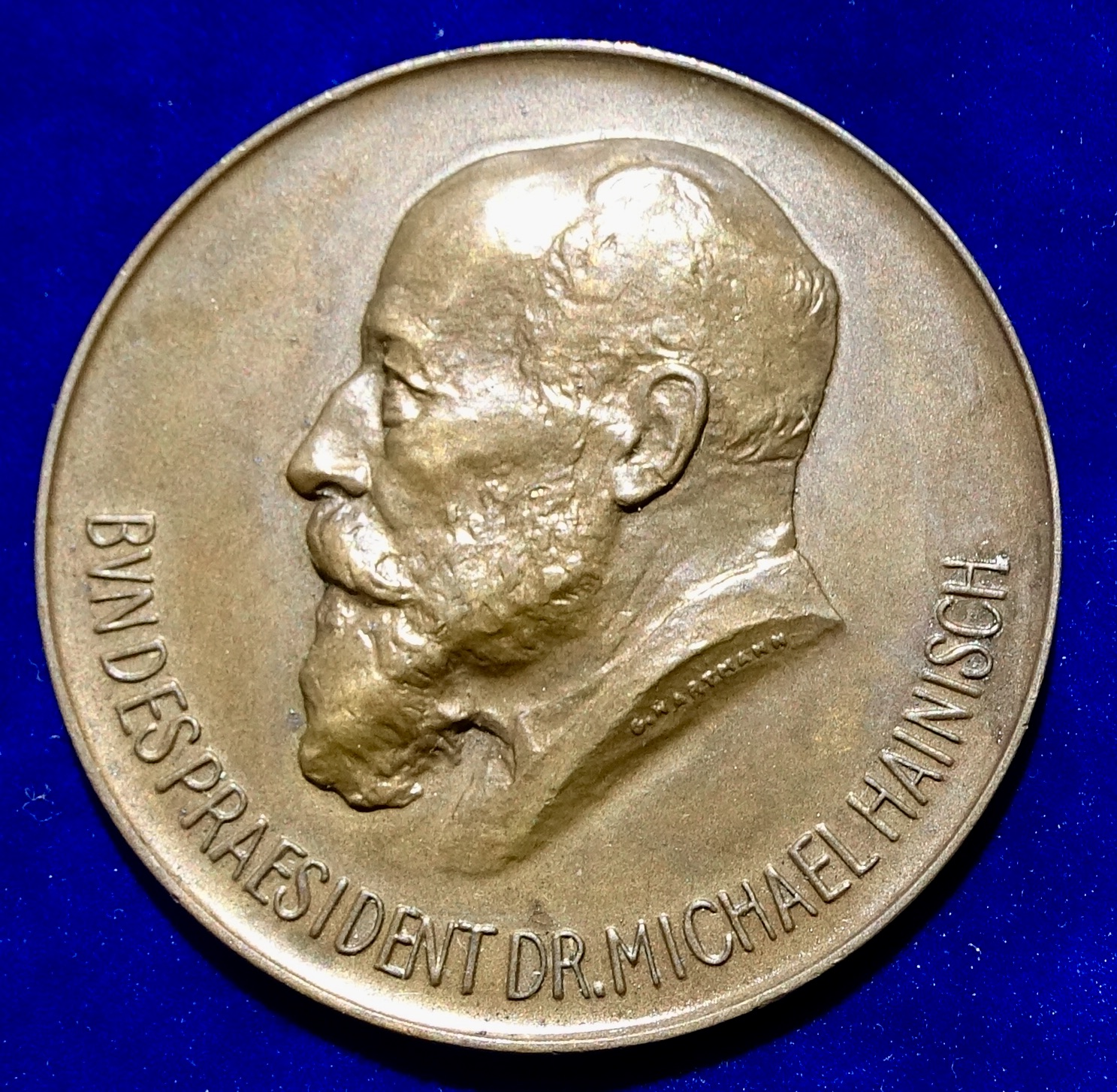
Bronze medal of Michael Hainisch, Federal President of Austria, 1920 (ND), artist Grete Hartmann, née Chrobak, 1869–1946

Hainisch held aloof from political parties. He was chosen president because of his personal authority, although he was not a member of the parliament. He was an independent candidate. He was elected and assumed office in 1920 and stayed for two terms until 1928. He was married to Emilia Figdor, the descendant of a prominent Viennese assimilated Jewish family. Emilia's father, Gustav, was a town councillor of the city of Vienna.

As a president, he worked hard to improve the dire situation Austria found itself in after the war. He did a lot to develop the agricultural sector, encouraged the electrification of the railway, and tried to develop more tourism, especially in the Alps. Trade with neighbouring countries, such as Germany, was encouraged. He also became a protector of local traditions and culture and initiated the creation of the law of protected monuments.

He also became an honorary member of the Akademie der Wissenschaften (Academy of Sciences).

In 1928, the main parties proposed to amend the constitution in order to re-elect Hainisch for a third term. Federal Chancellor Ignaz Seipel proposed a one-year term for Hainisch, but Hainisch declined a third term. He subsequently served as Commerce Minister from 1929 to 1930.

Controversially, he supported Pan-German ideas and later supported the Anschluss of Austria to Nazi-Germany in 1938, as did many of his compatriots. He died in February 1940, just nearly two years after the Anschluss and a few months after World War II started.

== Works ==
He was a prolific author of works on sociology and politics:

- Zukunft der Österreicher ("The future of the Austrians," 1892);
- Zur Wahlreform ("Towards electoral reform," 1895);
- Kampf ums Dasein und Sozialpolitik ("The fight for existence and social politics," 1899);
- Heimarbeit (1906);
- Fleischnot und alpine Landwirtschaft.

== Awards ==
- Grand Cross of the Order of the White Lion, Czechoslovakia (1926);
- Wilhelm Exner Medal, 1926.

Political offices
| New office | President of Austria; 1920–1928 | Succeeded by Wilhelm Miklas |
| Preceded by Hans Schürff | Minister of Commerce and Transport; 1929–1930 | Succeeded by Friedrich Schuster |
