= Victor Adler =

Austrian politician (1852–1918)

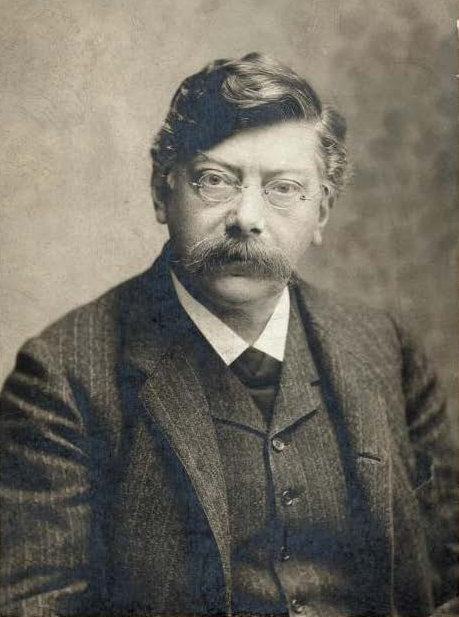
- Adler c. 1900

Minister of Foreign Affairs
- In office 30 October 1918 – 11 November 1918
- Chancellor: Karl Renner
- Preceded by: office established (partly Gyula Andrássy, Jr. as Foreign Minister of Austria-Hungary)
- Succeeded by: Otto Bauer

Chairman of the SDAPÖ
- In office 1 January 1889 – November 1918
- Preceded by: office established
- Succeeded by: Karl Seitz

Personal details
- Born: 24 June 1852 Prague, Bohemia, Austrian Empire
- Died: 11 November 1918 (aged 66) Vienna, German-Austria
- Party: Social Democratic Workers' Party of Austria (SDAP)
- Parent(s): Salomon Markus Adler; Johanna Herzl
- Education: University of Vienna
- Profession: Neurologist

Victor Adler (24 June 1852 – 11 November 1918) was an Austrian politician, a leader of the labour movement and founder of the Social Democratic Workers' Party (SDAP).

== Life ==
Adler was born on 24 June 1852, in Prague, the son of a Jewish merchant, who came from Leipnik in Moravia. His family moved to the Leopoldstadt borough of Vienna when he was three years old. He attended the renowned Catholic Schottenstift gymnasium, together with Heinrich Friedjung one of the few Jewish students, whereafter he studied chemistry and medicine at the University of Vienna. Having graduated in 1881, he worked as assistant of Theodor Meynert at the psychiatric department of the General Hospital.

In 1878, he had married Emma Braun. Their son Friedrich was born in 1879. From 1882 to 1889, the couple resided at 19 Berggasse in the Alsergrund borough of Vienna, an address that later became famous as the office of Sigmund Freud (the present-day Sigmund Freud Museum).

Adler initially supported the German national movement led by Georg von Schönerer and worked on the 1882 Linz Program. However, Schönerer's increasingly antisemitic policies, culminating in the amendment of an Aryan paragraph, led to an estrangement with Adler, who focussed on social issues. From 1886, he published the Marxist journal Gleichheit (Equality), covering the working conditions of the Wienerberger brick factory and agitating against the truck system. After Gleichheit was banned, he issued the Arbeiter-Zeitung (Workers' Newspaper) from 1889. Adler travelled to Germany and Switzerland, where he met with Friedrich Engels, August Bebel and Karl Liebknecht. He was charged several times for his activities and spent nine months in prison.

Adler, a both moderate and charismatic social democrat, was able to unite the Austrian labour movement under his leadership, fighting against the anti-socialist laws implemented by the Cisleithanian government of Minister President Eduard Taaffe in 1884. At an 1888 conference in Hainfeld he formed the Social Democratic Workers' Party and became its first chairman. As a member of the Imperial Council parliament from 1905, he played a leading role in the fight for universal suffrage, finally achieved under Minister President Max Wladimir von Beck in 1906, whereafter the Social Democrats emerged as winner from the 1907 Cisleithanian legislative election. An active supporter of the Second International, Adler tried to maintain the unity of the Austrian Social Democrats beyond ethnic conflicts and backed the idea of the United States of Greater Austria replacing the Dual Monarchy.

Before World War I, Adler was leader of what is now called the Social Democratic Party of Austria in Vienna. He publicly backed the Imperial government's decision to go to war, but had private misgivings. Entering the new Austrian government in October 1918, he advocated the unification of the rump Austrian state with Germany but died of heart failure—coincidentally on the last day of World War I—before he could pursue this project.

He was the father of Friedrich Adler, known as the assassin of Minister-President Karl von Stürgkh.

Psychiatrist Viktor Frankl is named after Adler, his father was a socialist and admirer of him.

== See also ==
- Linz Program of 1882
- List of members of the Austrian Parliament who died in office
