= Eugen von Philippovich =

Austrian economist (1858–1917)

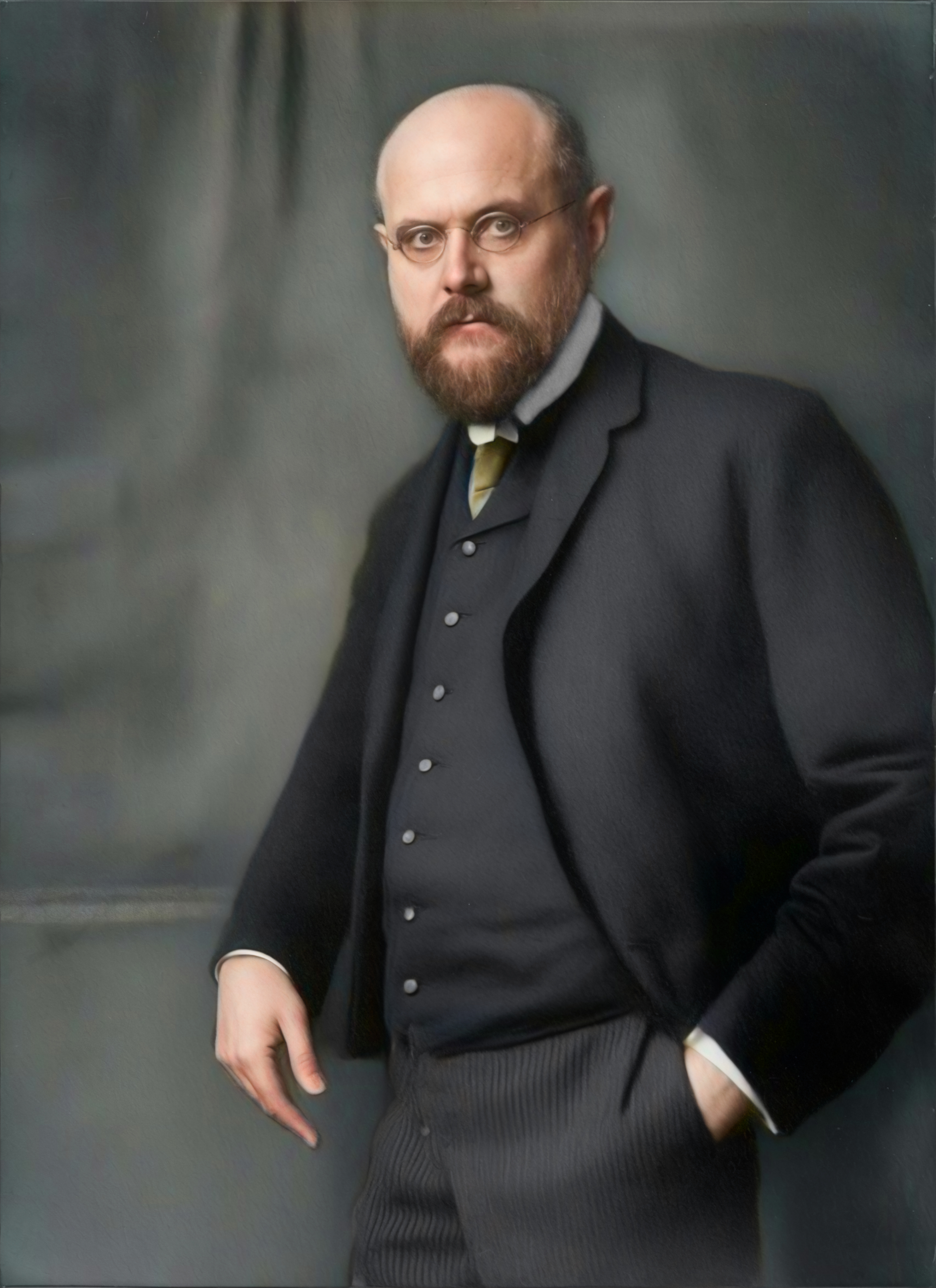
- Born: March 15, 1858; Vienna, Austrian Empire
- Died: June 4, 1917 (aged 59); Vienna, Austria-Hungary

Academic background
- Education: University of Graz; University of Vienna

Academic work
- Discipline: Political economics
- School or tradition: Austrian School
- Institutions: University of Freiburg; University of Vienna
- Notable students: Joseph Schumpeter, Emil Lederer

Eugen Philippovich Freiherr von Philippsberg (* 15 March 1858 – † 4 June 1917) was an Austrian economist, stemming from the Croatian noble family Philippovich von Philippsberg. His textbook Grundriss der politischen Oekonomie was "the most successful German-language textbook on economics" of its time: the first volume went through 19 editions, selling over 63,000 copies.

== Origin ==
Eugen Philippovich von Philippsberg was born into a Croatian noble family, who had settled along the Military Frontier. He was a son of the k.k. Feldmarschallleutnant Nikolaus Philippovich (1785–1858) and Emma von Roth. He was a grandson of the postmaster Maximilian Philippovich, deceased 1810, landowner in Gospic in Croatia and his wife Klara von Vukassovich, deceased 1811. Eugen Philippovich's great-grandfather Elias Filipović (Philippovich), was elevated to the status of hereditary nobility on 5 July 1781 and given the nobiliary particle von Philippsberg.

== Life ==
He studied law in Vienna and Graz, where he became a member of the Arminia Graz fraternity in 1876, and habilitated in political economics. He taught at the University of Freiburg from 1885 until 1893, before moving to be professor of economics at the University of Vienna in 1893. Among his notable students were Joseph Schumpeter and Emil Lederer. In addition to his scientific career, he also pursued political and cultural interests. He was influential in the Social Political Party. Philippovich was a member of the Verein für Socialpolitik, founded in 1873, where he campaigned for the "national integration and mobilization" of the workforce through a combination of social policy and colonial policy. As a "convinced colonial politician", he was elected to the board of the German Colonial Association in Freiburg im Breisgau, which he subsequently represented with appearances at a national level in Berlin and Dresden. Philippovich was one of the co-founders of the International Association for the Legal Protection of Workers in Paris in 1900. He also was a collector and connoisseur of Eskimo art and ivory carving.

He is buried at the Dübling Cemetery.

== Family ==
Eugen Philippovic von Philippsberg was the cousin of the brothers Joseph Philippovich von Philippsberg (Croatian Josip barun Filipović Filipsberški) (1818–1889) and Franz Philippovich von Philippsberg (Croatian Franjo Filipović Filipsberški) (1820–1903), both of whom served as field commanders in the Imperial-Royal Army of the Austro-Hungarian Monarchy.

== Legacy ==
In 1926, Philippovichgasse in Vienna-Döbling (19th district) was named after him.

== Works ==
- Die Bank von England im dienste der finanzverwaltung des staates, 1885. Translated by Christabel Meredith as History of the Bank of England and its financial services to the State, 1911.
- (ed.) Auswanderung und Auswanderungspolitik in Deutschland : Berichte über die Entwicklung und den gegenwärtigen Zustand des Auswanderungswesens in den Einzelstaaten und im Reich [Emigration and Emigration Policy in Germany: Reports on the Development and the Current State of Emigration in the States and in the Reich]. 1892.
- Grundriss der politischen oekonomie [Foundations of Political Economy], 1893
- Die Entwicklung der wirtschaftspolitischen Ideen im 19. Jahrhundert [The development of economic policy ideas in the nineteenth century], 1910.
- (ed.) Economic protectionism by Josef Grunzel, 1916.
