= Marianne Hainisch =

Founder and leader of the Austrian women's movement

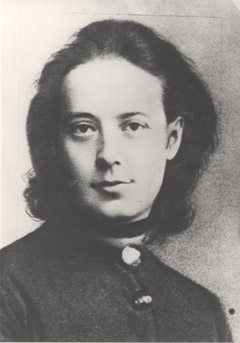
- Hainisch, circa 1872
- Born: Marianne Perger; 25 March 1839; Baden bei Wien, Austrian Empire
- Died: 5 May 1936 (aged 97); Vienna, Austria
- Known for: Founder of the Austrian women's movement
- Spouse: Michael Hainisch (m. 1857)
- Children: Michael (1858); Maria (1860)

Marianne Hainisch, born Marianne Perger (25 March 1839 – 5 May 1936) was the founder and leader of the Austrian women's movement. She was also the mother of Michael Hainisch, the first President of Austria (1920–1928).

== Life ==
Marianne Perger was born in 1839 in Baden near Vienna in Austria. Her mother employed tutors to help her teach Marianne and her siblings. Her father Josef Perger owned factories in Hirtenberg.

In 1857 Marianne married the industrialist Michael Hainisch (owner of a spinning factory in Aue) with whom she had two children (Michael, 1858, and Maria, 1860). In 1868 the family moved to Vienna. During the American Civil War (1861–65), the business was in crisis, as cotton wool could no longer be sourced from the United States.

In the late 1860s, a transformative experience for Marianne was the difficulty a friend of hers had in obtaining work to support her family after her husband had fallen ill. Despite her friend's best efforts (she spoke several languages and had musical talents) she was unable to find work. For the 30-year-old Marianne, the importance of education in enabling middle-class women to access work became clear. In 1870 she wrote an article (On the Education of Women), which no newspaper would publish. At a meeting on 25 March 1870 she presented her article, culminating in a call for the City of Vienna to institute parallel school classes for girls. This bombshell was widely reported in the newspapers, and resulted in the First Austrian Savings Bank donating 40,000 florins for the foundation of a girls' school.

In 1888 Hainisch initiated the League for Extended Women's Education, which agitated that women be permitted to enroll for higher education. In 1902 she founded the Federation of Austrian Women's Organisations, and served as its Chair until 1918. On 17 October 1906, she convened a meeting of the Komitee für Frauenstimmrecht (Committee for Women's Suffrage), welcoming speakers Carrie Chapman Catt and Aletta Jacobs, who had recently participated in the Copenhagen Conference of the International Woman Suffrage Alliance. Friederike Zeileis served as Catt's translator, and Hainisch notified the group that thousands of signatures had been collected on a petition to be presented shortly to the legislature urging the repeal of Section 30 of the Association Act. Section 30, was the part of the legal code which denied women political authority. In 1919 she was elected Deputy President of the International Council of Women, which the Federation had affiliated to in 1904, a position she held until 1924.

In autumn 1918 Marianne Hainisch joined the Civil-Democratic Party, and eleven years later was co-founder of the Austrian Women's Party. Hainisch is regarded as the initiator of Mother's Day in Austria, which has been celebrated since 1924.

She died on 5 May 1936.

In 1967 her home town of Baden erected a statue in her honour. In 1989 Austria issued a commemorative stamp, on the occasion of the 150th anniversary of her birth. In 2002 Vienna named a street (Marianne-Hainisch-Gasse) in her honour.

== Works ==
- On the Education of Women, 1870
- The Mothers, 1913.
