= Mattioli =

Mattioli is an Italian surname. Notable people with the surname include:

- Alessandro Mattioli (born 1998), Italian footballer
- Carlo Mattioli (born 1954), Italian race walker
- Denise Mattioli (born 1952), Brazilian volleyball player
- Ercole Antonio Mattioli (1640–1694), Italian minister
- Gaspare Mattioli (1806–1843), Italian painter
- Gianni Francesco Mattioli (born 1940), Italian politician and university professor
- Girolamo Mattioli (fl. 1577), Italian painter and engraver
- Italo Mattioli (born 1985), Italian professional football player
- Ludovico Mattioli (1662-1747), Italian painter and engraver
- Luisa Mattioli (1936–2021), Italian actress
- Marcus Mattioli (born 1960), Brazilian swimmer
- Mario Mattioli (1945–2003), Italian volleyball player
- Massimo Mattioli (1943–2019), Italian cartoonist
- Mattiolo Mattioli (died 1480), Italian author
- Maurizio Mattioli (born 1950), Italian actor and comedian
- Pietro Andrea Mattioli (1501–1577), Italian herbalist
- Raffaele Mattioli (1775-after 1831), Italian painter
- Rocky Mattioli (born 1953), Italian-Australian former boxing world champion
