= Heinrich Friedjung =

Austrian historian and journalist

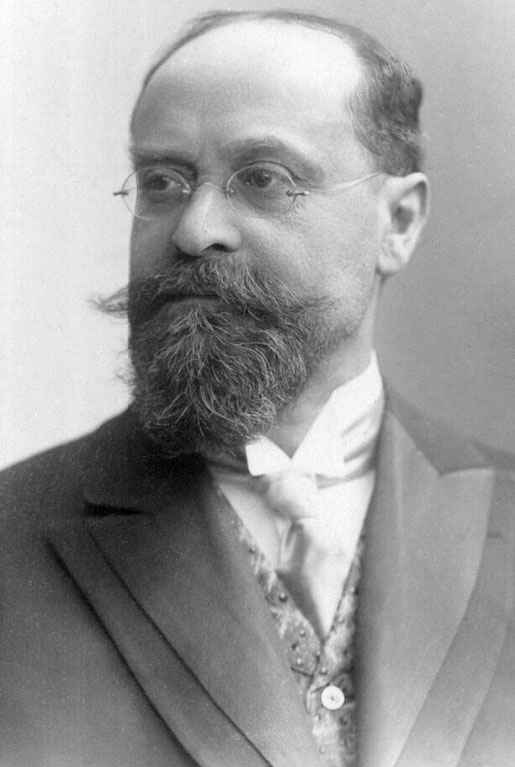
- Born: 18 January 1851; Roštín, Margraviate of Moravia
- Died: 14 July 1920 (aged 69); Vienna

Heinrich Friedjung (18 January 1851 – 14 July 1920) was an Austrian historian and journalist.

== Life ==
Friedjung was born in Roschtin, Austrian Empire (today Roštín, Czech Republic). The son of a Jewish family grew up in Vienna, and studied history in Prague and Berlin under Theodor Mommsen and Leopold von Ranke. He taught history and German language at the Commercial Academy (Handelsakademie) in Vienna from 1873 to 1879; he was then fired for criticizing the government.

He subsequently became active in politics, notably for his liberal and German-nationalistic views and support for the Greater German solution to the German question.

Friedjung died in Vienna.

== Works ==
- Kaiser Karl IV. u. sein Antheil am geistigen Leben seiner Zeit, Vienna 1876
- Der Ausgleich mit Ungarn. Politische Studie über das Verhältnis Österreichs zu Ungarn und Deutschland, 3 Auflagen, Leipzig 1876/77
- Ein Stück Zeitungsgeschichte, Vienna 1887
- Der Kampf um die Vorherrschaft in Deutschland 1859 bis 1866, zehn Auflagen, Stuttgart-Berlin 1897–1917 (Google books)
- Benedeks nachgelassene Papiere, Leipzig 1901
- Der Krimkrieg und die österreichische Politik, Stuttgart-Berlin 1911
- Österreich von 1848 bis 1860, Berlin 1908
- Denkschrift aus Deutschösterreich, Vienna 1915
- Das Zeitalter des Imperialismus 1884 bis 1914, 3 vol., Berlin 1919–1923
- Historische Aufsätze, 2 vol., Stuttgart- Berlin,1917–1919
