= Peter G. J. Pulzer =

British historian (1929–2023)

- Born: Peter George Julius Pulzer; 29 May 1929; Vienna, Austria
- Died: 26 January 2023 (aged 93)
- Occupation: Historian

Peter George Julius Pulzer (29 May 1929 – 26 January 2023) was an Austrian-born British historian who was Gladstone Professor of Government at the University of Oxford from 1985 till 1996.

== Biography ==
Peter Pulzer was born in Vienna, Austria, in 1929, the son of a civil engineer. In the aftermath of Kristallnacht, when both his father and grandfather had briefly been taken into custody by the Gestapo, Pulzer and his family migrated to the United Kingdom with the assistance of a retired clergyman from Hertfordshire. Learning English quickly, he attended Surbiton County Grammar School and went on to study history at King's College, Cambridge, graduating with a first-class degree in 1950 and a PhD ten years later; he was also awarded a BSc(Econ.) from the University of London. At Oxford, Pulzer was a college lecturer in politics at Christ Church from 1957, was appointed to a university post in 1960, and upon being elected professor in 1985 became a fellow of All Souls.

Pulzer became known at first in Britain for his analyses of electoral politics, but his 1966 book The Emergence of Political Anti-Semitism in Germany and Austria 1867–1914, which was critically acclaimed in the academic world, subsequently came to be regarded as the benchmark standard for research into anti-Semitism in central Europe. Later books on these themes included Jews and the German state: the political history of a minority, 1848–1933 (1992) and Germany 1870–1945: Politics, state formation, and war (1997).

Pulzer was a supporter of the moderate wing of the British Labour Party. He thus earned some notoriety when he was among those on Oxford's governing assembly who voted not to award Margaret Thatcher an honorary degree in 1985. After retiring from Oxford in 1996 he was made a professorial fellow at the Institute for German Studies at the University of Birmingham. Pulzer died on 26 January 2023, at the age of 93.

== Honours ==
In 2008, Peter G. J. Pulzer received the Decoration of Honour for Services to the Republic of Austria.

== Works ==
- The rise of political anti-Semitism in Germany and Austria. J. Wiley, New York 1964. Übersetzung: Die Entstehung des politischen Antisemitismus in Deutschland und Österreich 1867–1914. Sigbert Mohn, Gütersloh 1966; durchgesehene und erweiterte Neuausgabe: Vandenhoeck & Ruprecht, Göttingen 2004, ISBN 3-525-36954-9 (with Forschungsbericht).
- Political representation and elections in Britain (= Studies in political science. Band 1). Allen & Unwin, London 1967.
- Germany 1870–1945. Politics, state formation, and war. Oxford University Press, Oxford 1997.
- (with Wolfgang Benz, Arnold Paucker) Jüdisches Leben in der Weimarer Republik / Jews in the Weimar Republic (= Schriftenreihe wissenschaftlicher Abhandlungen des Leo Baeck Instituts. Band 57). Mohr Siebeck, Tübingen 1998.
- (with Kurt Richard Luther) Austria 1945–95. Fifty years of the Second Republic. Ashgate, Aldershot 1998.
- Fog in Channel. Anglo-German perspectives in the nineteenth century. German Historical Institute, London 2000.
- Jews and the German state. The political history of a minority, 1848–1933. Blackwell, Oxford 1992.
