= Third Conference of the International Woman Suffrage Alliance =

Suffragist conference (1906)

Third Conference of the International Woman Suffrage Alliance was held in Copenhagen, Denmark on August 7, 8, 9, 10, and 11, 1906. The Canadian National Association had been revived and had become a member. New national associations had been formed in Hungary and Italy and these had become members. The Congress voted upon the application of the new organization, called the Russian Union, which was unanimously accepted, and the Congress therefore had twelve affiliated associations in its membership. Fraternal delegates were present from friendly associations in Finland, Iceland and France, thus making fifteen countries represented. A committee was appointed at this Congress to attempt a union of Finnish societies for the purpose of affiliating with the Alliance. Later, the "Unionem" of Finland was admitted.

== See also ==
- International Alliance of Women

== Bibliography ==
- International Alliance of Women for Suffrage and Equal Citizenship (1908). Report of Congress. Amsterdam, Holland.
