= 1911 Cisleithanian legislative election in the Czech lands =

- June & July 1911

194 of the 516 seats in the Imperial Council
- Turnout: 1,720,698 (83.11%)
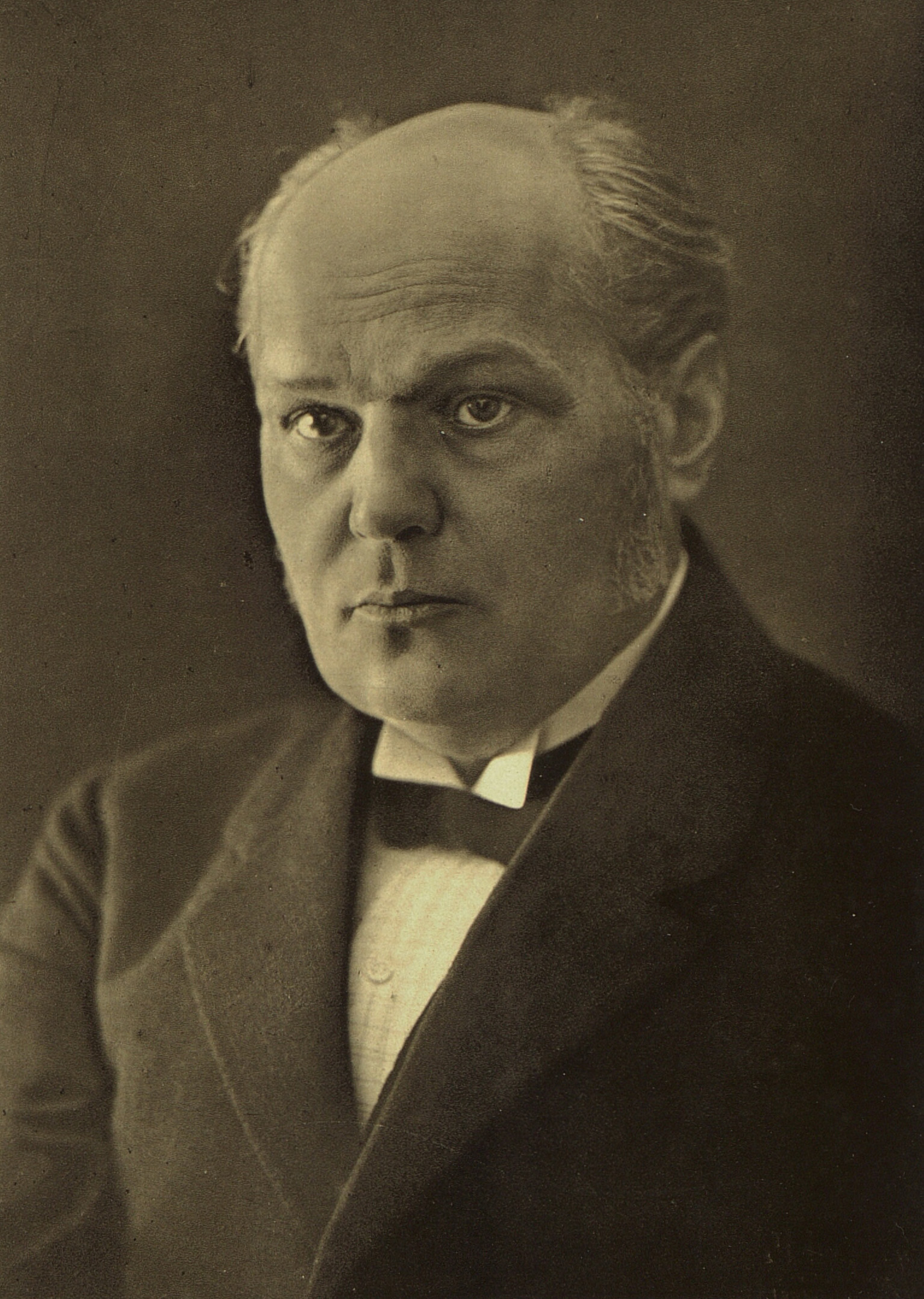

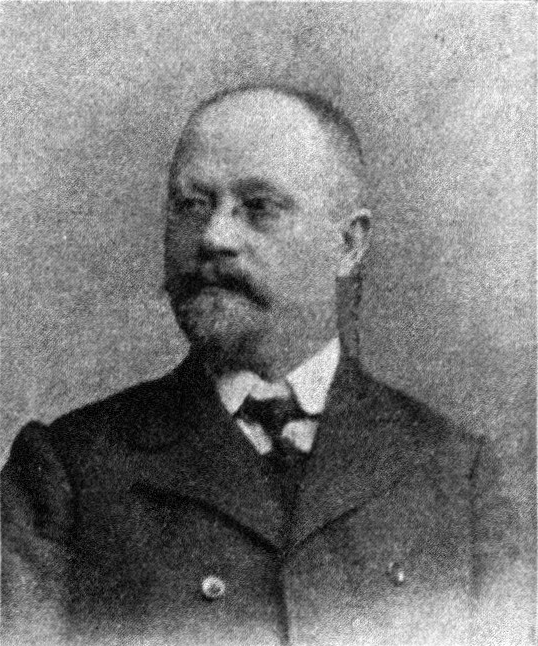

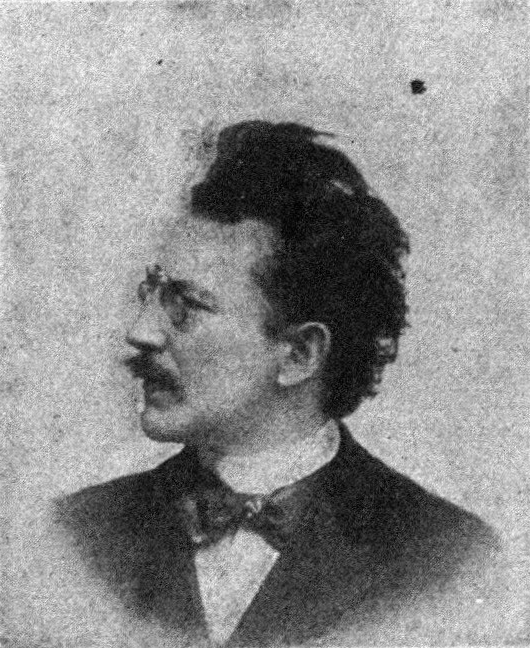

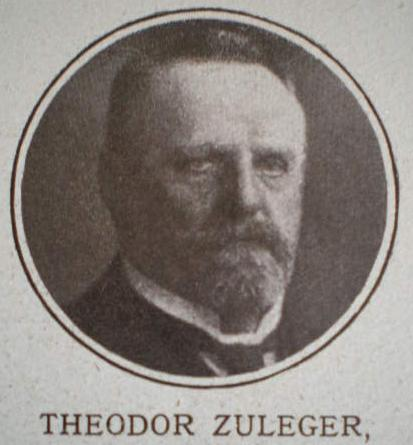

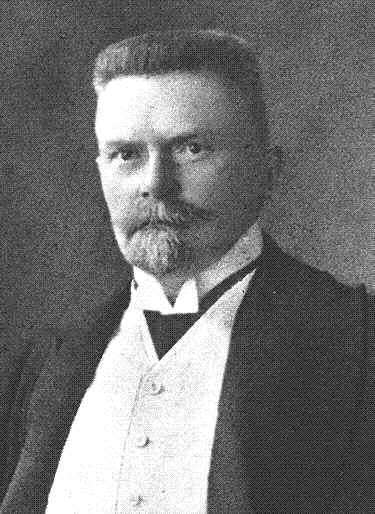

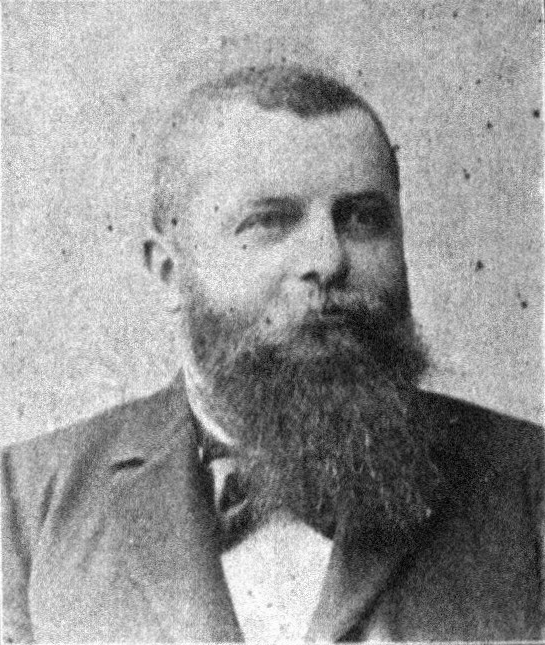
	First party	Second party	Third party
Leader	Antonín Švehla	Antonín Němec	Karl Hermann Wolf
Party	RSZML	ČSSD	DRP
Alliance	Uniform Bohemian Club	Club of Bohemian Social Democrats	German National Association
Leader since	1909	1904	1902
Leader's seat	Bohemian Diet	Bohemia	Bohemia
Last election	27 seats	24 seats	13 seats
Seats won	37	25	22
Seat change	▲10	▲1	▲9
Popular vote	298,230	340,122	101,347
Percentage	17.37%	19.81%	5.90%
	Fourth party	Fifth party	Sixth party
Leader	Theodor Zuleger	Karel Kramář	Gustav Groß
Party	DAP	Young Czech	DFP
Alliance	German National Association	Uniform Bohemian Club	German National Association
Leader since	1905	1897
Leader's seat	Bohemian Diet	Bohemia	Moravia
Last election	17 seats	15 seats	16 seats
Seats won	20	14	14
Seat change	▲3	▼1	▼2
Popular vote	103,889	62,618	62,110
Percentage	6.04%	3.65%	3.62%

Legislative elections to elect members of the Cisleithanian Imperial Council were held in the Czech lands over several days in June and July 1911. The Czech lands (Kingdom of Bohemia, Margraviate of Moravia and the Duchy of Upper and Lower Silesia) elected 194 out of the 516 seats in the Imperial Council.

This was the second election under universal male suffrage and it was won by the Czechoslavonic Agrarian Party (the German Agrarian Party was also successful). Czech National Social Party and other German nationalist parties also gained support; by contrast the election meant losses for Catholic parties.

The election was the last before the dissolution of the empire as a result of World War I. In 1918, the election result was used as a key to the composition of the Revolutionary National Assembly, the provisional parliament of Czechoslovakia up to the 1920 election.

== Results ==
Party	First round			Second round			Total seats	+/–
Party	Votes	%	Seats	Votes	%	Seats	Total seats	+/–
Czech Nation
Czechoslavonic Social Democratic Workers' Party	340,122	19.81	14	176,868	19.23	11	25	+1
Czechoslavonic Agrarian Party	298,230	17.37	9	215,360	23.42	28	37	+10
Catholic-National and Christian Social Parties in Moravia	124,391	7.24	5	73,230	7.96	2	7	-3
Czech National Social Party	81,631	4.75	8	23,011	2.50	5	13	+7
National Liberal Party	62,618	3.65	10	20,547	2.23	4	14	-1
Czech Christian Social Party in the Kingdom of Bohemia	60,415	3.52	0	42,423	4.61	0	0	-7
People's Progressive Party in Moravia	40,173	2.34	0	38,982	4.24	4	4	-2
Czech Constitutionalist Progressive Party	21,476	1.25	2	10,975	1.19	2	4	+1
Czech Social Democratic Party in Austria	9,112	0.53	1				1	+1
Czech Independents	8,186	0.48	0	6,235	0.68	1	1	0
Czech Progressive Party	6,603	0.38	1				1	-1
Moravian National Party	6,522	0.38	0	6,522	0.71	0	0	-3
Paper candidates	3,066	0.18	0				0	0
National Party	2,803	0.16	1				1	-1
National Party in Silesia	1,893	0.11	0				0	-1
German Nation
Social Democratic Worker's Party of Austria	228,739	13.32	10	106,349	11.56	0	10	-11
German Agrarian Party	103,789	6.04	8	60,874	6.62	12	20	+3
German Radical Party	101,347	5.90	10	50,552	5.50	12	22	+9
German Progressive Party	62,110	3.62	11	8,819	0.96	3	14	-2
German People's Party	30,085	1.75	1	26,164	2.84	6	7	-5
Christian Social Party	28,699	1.67	0	14,732	1.60	1	1	0
German Workers' Party	22,821	1.33	1	8,936	0.97	2	3	+3
Pan-German Unification	17,140	1.00	1	10,739	1.17	2	3	+1
German Independents	6,759	0.39	2				2	+2
Free Socialists	6,263	0.36	0	6,158	0.67	1	1	-1
Paper candidates	5,886	0.34	0				0	0
Polish Nation
Polish Social Democratic Party	14,378	0.84	1	6,059	0.66	0	1	-1
Polish People's Party	9,628	0.56	0	6,102	0.66	1	1	+1
Polish Clerical Party	6,039	0.35	1				1	0
Polish Pro-German Party	2,832	0.16	0				0	0
Jewish Nation
Jewish National Party	72	0.00	0				0	0
Unknown or split
Unknown or split votes	3,435	0.20	–	90	0.01	–	–	–
Total	1,717,263	100.00	97	919,727	100.00	97	194	0
Valid votes	1,717,263	99.80		919,727	97.95			
Invalid/blank votes	3,435	0.20		19,220	2.05			
Total votes	1,720,698	100.00		938,947	100.00			
Registered voters/turnout	2,070,389	83.11		1,160,723	80.89			
Source: ANNO

Vote share (first round)
Czech Social Democrats	19.8%
Czech Agrarians	17.4%
German Social Democrats	13.3%
Moravian Catholic parties	7.2%
German Agrarians	6.0%
German Radicals	5.9%
Czech National Social Party	4.8%
Ýoung Czechs	3.7%
German Progressives	3.6%
Czech Christian Socials	3.5%
Moravian People's Progressives	2.3%
Others	12.5%

=== Results for Bohemia ===
Party or alliance		First round			Second round			Total seats	+/–
Party or alliance		Votes	%	Seats	Votes	%	Seats	Total seats	+/–
Czech Nation
Czechoslavonic Social Democratic Workers' Party		244,804	22.01	12	107,913	19.58	2	14	-3
Czechoslavonic Agrarian Party		208,061	18.71	7	141,641	25.70	22	29	+6
National accord	Czech National Social Party	77,209	6.94	8	18,589	3.37	4	12	+6
National accord	National Liberal Party	62,618	5.63	10	20,547	3.73	4	14	-1
National accord	National Party	2,803	0.25	1				1	-1
National accord	Total	142,630	12.82	19	39,136	7.10	8	27	+4
Czech Christian Social Party in the Kingdom of Bohemia		60,415	5.43	0	42,423	7.70	0	0	-7
Czech Constitutionalist Progressive Party		21,476	1.93	2	10,975	1.99	2	4	+1
Czech Independents		8,024	0.72	0	6,235	1.13	1	1	0
Paper candidates		3,039	0.27	0				0	0
Czech Progressive Party		1,419	0.13	0				0	-1
Czech Social Democratic Party in Austria		210	0.02	0				0	0
German Nation
Social Democratic Worker's Party of Austria		171,062	15.38	9	78,482	14.24	0	9	-7
German Agrarian Party		78,721	7.08	4	57,152	10.37	11	15	-1
German Radical Party		77,993	7.01	8	33,545	6.09	8	16	+5
German Progressive Party		22,916	2.06	4	3,062	0.56	1	5	-1
German Workers' Party		18,166	1.63	1	4,333	0.79	1	2	+2
Pan-German Unification		17,053	1.53	1	10,739	1.95	2	3	+1
Christian Social Party		10,243	0.92	0	4,276	0.78	1	1	+1
German Independents		6,759	0.61	2				2	+2
Free Socialists		6,263	0.56	0	6,158	1.12	1	–	0
Paper candidates		5,886	0.53	0				0	0
German People's Party		5,161	0.46	0	5,161	0.94	1	1	-2
Unknown or split
Unknown or split votes		1,949	0.18	–				–	–
Total		1,112,250	100.00	69	551,231	100.00	61	129	0
Valid votes		1,112,250	99.62		551,231	99.13			
Invalid/blank votes		4,295	0.38		4,845	0.87			
Total votes		1,116,545	100.00		556,076	100.00			
Registered voters/turnout		1,435,439	77.78		746,659	74.48			
Source: ANNO

=== Results for Moravia ===
Party	First round			Second round			Total seats	+/–
Party	Votes	%	Seats	Votes	%	Seats	Total seats	+/–
Czech Nation
Catholic-National and Christian Social Parties in Moravia	124,391	25.76	5	73,230	24.21	2	7	-3
Czechoslavonic Social Democratic Workers' Party	83,007	17.19	2	59,361	19.62	9	11	+6
Czechoslavonic Agrarian Party	79,877	16.54	0	63,427	20.97	6	6	+2
People's Progressive Party in Moravia	40,173	8.32	0	38,982	12.89	4	4	-2
Moravian National Party	6,522	1.35	0	6,522	2.16	0	0	-3
Czech Progressive Party	5,184	1.07	1				1	0
Czech National Social Party	4,422	0.92	0	4,422	1.46	1	1	+1
Czech Social Democratic Party in Austria	722	0.15	0				0	0
Czech Independents	162	0.03	0				0	-1
Paper candidates	27	0.01	0				0	0
German Nation
Social Democratic Worker's Party of Austria	35,541	7.36	0	13,892	4.59	0	0	-3
German Progressive Party	32,573	6.74	6	3,595	1.19	1	7	-1
German Radical Party	21,144	4.38	1	17,007	5.62	4	5	+4
German People's Party	17,436	3.61	1	13,515	4.47	3	4	-2
German Agrarian Party	15,525	3.21	3				3	+3
Christian Social Party	14,859	3.08	0	8,573	2.83	0	0	-1
Pan-German Unification	60	0.01	0				0	0
German Workers' Party	52	0.01	0				0	0
Jewish Nation
Jewish National Party	72	0.01	0				0	0
Unknown or split
Unknown or split votes	1,179	0.24	–	0	0.00	–	–	–
Total	482,928	100.00	19	302,526	100.00	30	49	0
Valid votes	482,928	98.05		302,526	95.92			
Invalid/blank votes	9,614	1.95		12,855	4.08			
Total votes	492,542	100.00		315,381	100.00			
Registered voters/turnout	548,000	89.88		342,157	92.17			
Source: ANNO

=== Results for Silesia ===
Party	First round			Second round			Total seats	+/–
Party	Votes	%	Seats	Votes	%	Seats	Total seats	+/–
Czech Nation
Czechoslavonic Social Democratic Workers' Party	12,311	10.08	0	9,594	14.56	0	–	-2
Czechoslavonic Agrarian Party	10,292	8.43	0	10,292	15.62	2	2	+2
Czech Social Democratic Party in Austria	8,180	6.70	1				1	+1
National Party in Silesia	1,893	1.55	0				0	-1
German Nation
Social Democratic Worker's Party of Austria	22,136	18.13	1	13,976	21.21	0	1	-1
German Agrarian Party	9,543	7.82	1	3,722	5.65	1	2	+1
German People's Party	7,488	6.13	0	7,488	11.37	2	2	-1
German Progressive Party	6,621	5.42	1	2,162	3.28	1	2	0
German Workers' Party	4,603	3.77	0	4,603	6.99	1	1	+1
Christian Social Party	3,597	2.95	0	1,883	2.86	0	0	0
German Radical Party	2,210	1.81	1				1	0
Pan-German Unification	27	0.02	0				0	0
Polish Nation
Polish Social Democratic Party	14,378	11.78	1	6,059	9.20	0	1	-1
Polish People's Party	9,628	7.89	0	6,102	9.26	1	1	+1
Polish Clerical Party	6,039	4.95	1				1	0
Polish Pro-German Party	2,832	2.32	0				0	0
Unknown or split
Unknown or split votes	307	0.25	–	0	0.00	–	–	–
Total	122,085	100.00	7	65,881	100.00	8	15	0
Valid votes	122,085	98.46		65,881	97.74			
Invalid/blank votes	1,905	1.54		1,520	2.26			
Total votes	123,990	100.00		67,401	100.00			
Registered voters/turnout	132,919	93.28		71,907	93.73			
Source: ANNO

== See also ==
- 1911 Cisleithanian legislative election
