= 1900–01 Cisleithanian legislative election =

- 12 December 1900 to 18 January 1901

All 425 seats in the Imperial Council 213 seats needed for a majority
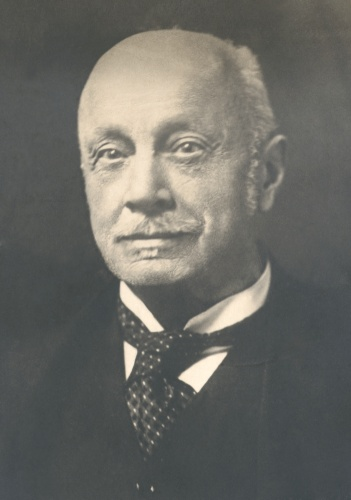

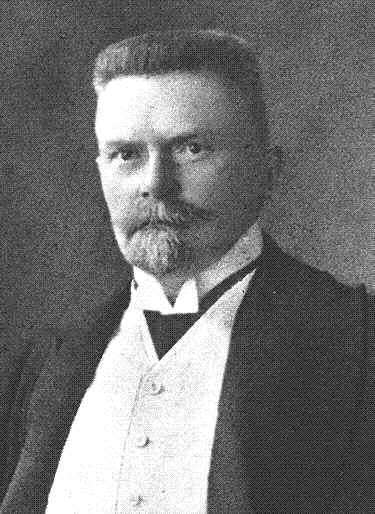

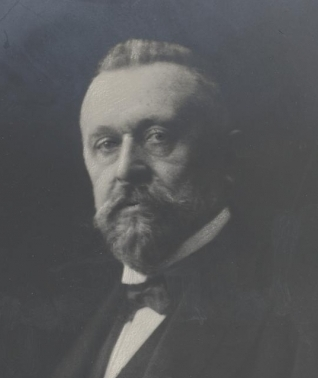
	First party	Second party	Third party
Leader	Otto Steinwender	Karel Kramář
Party	DVP	NSS	PPK
Alliance	Association of German People's Parties	Bohemian Club	Poland Club
Last election	31 seats, 4.53%	53 seats, 6.09%	46 seats, 2.47%
Seats won	51	50	49
Seat change	▲20	▼3	▲3
Popular vote	70,540	60,919	25,381
Percentage	6.56%	5.66%	2.36%
Swing	▲2.03pp	▼0.43pp	▼0.11pp
	Fourth party	Fifth party	Sixth party
Leader		Josef Maria Baernreither
Party	DLVP	VSGGB	DKKP
Alliance	German Progressive Union	Union of Constitutionalist Landowners	Centre Club
Last election	50 seats, 7.79%	23 seats, 0.23%	14 seats, 0.67%
Seats won	35	29	28
Seat change	▼15	▲6	▲14
Popular vote	75,190	2,257	8,037
Percentage	7.19%	0.23%	0.80%
Swing	▼0.60pp	0.0pp	▲0.13pp
Minister-President of Cisleithania before election
Ernest von Koerber
Elected Minister-President of Cisleithania
Ernest von Koerber

Legislative elections to elect the members of the 10th Imperial Council were held in Cisleithania, the northern and western ("Austrian") crown lands of Austria-Hungary, from December 12, 1900 to January 18, 1901.

== Electoral system ==
The elections were held according to the parameters set in 1896 Badeni electoral reform which classified voters according to their status and wealth into five curiae:

1. Landowners (85 seats)
2. Trade and industry chambers (21 seats)
3. Large and medium farmers (129 seats)
4. Male city residents who were annually paying at least 5 guilders worth of taxes (118 seats)
5. All men older than 24 (72 seats)

The votes for the Farming and Men over 24 curiae were also classified into 2 different categories, direct votes and electoral votes. Electoral votes carried a lot more weight than direct votes, and so the parties that won these seats generally did not get seats based on their total vote counts.

Only 6% of the adult population of Cisleithania had a right to vote. Voting took place in stages, with the last elections being held in 1st curiae in Lower Austria.

== Results ==
Party	Votes	%	Seats	+/–
Croatian Nation
Croatian National Party	3,695	0.34	6	+4
Party of Rights	528	0.05	3	New
Croatian Clerical Party	378	0.04	0	New
Croatian Radical Party	14	0.00	0	–3
Czech Nation
Young Czech Party	60,919	5.66	50	–3
Czech National Social Party	5,404	0.50	5	New
Czech National Party	4,675	0.43	2	+2
Czech Radical Party	2,271	0.21	0	New
Czech Compromise Candidates	1,890	0.18	1	–3
Czech Clerical Party	1,541	0.14	2	New
Common-Czechs Party	1,411	0.13	0	New
Bohemian Agrarian Party	1,004	0.09	2	New
Czech Radical Constitutionalist Party	666	0.06	0	New
Czech Radical Progressive Party	601	0.06	0	New
Czech Independents	428	0.04	0	New
Czech Trading Party	400	0.04	0	New
Christian Reform Party	177	0.02	0	New
Old Czech Party	42	0.00	0	0
German Nation
Christian Social and Anti-Semitic Party	295,354	27.45	25	–14
Social Democratic Party	251,652	23.39	11	–3
German-National Party	78,941	7.34	22	+10
German Liberal and Constitutional Party	75,190	6.99	35	–15
German People's Party	70,540	6.56	51	+20
German Clerical and Conservative Party	8,039	0.75	28	+14
Social Politicians	5,042	0.47	1	0
Agrarian Party	3,096	0.29	3	+2
Catholic People’s Party	2,292	0.21	0	–5
German Farmers' Party	1,275	0.12	1	+1
Clerical Independents	622	0.06	0	New
Catholic Conservative Party	599	0.06	0	–14
Italian Nation
Italian Liberal Party	21,107	1.96	12	–2
Italian Conservative Party	2,214	0.21	3	+2
Italian Autonomist Party	1,095	0.10	0	0
Italian Radical Party	1,056	0.10	2	New
Italian Clerical Party	450	0.04	0	–4
Italian Democratic Party	25	0.00	0	New
Landowner Candidates
Constitutionalist Landowners	2,257	0.21	29	+6
Conservative Landowners	896	0.08	4	–5
Bohemian Centre Party–Moravian Centre Party	512	0.05	4	+1
Bohemian Conservative Landowners	335	0.03	19	0
Polish-Armenian Landowners	81	0.01	1	New
Polish Nation
Polish Conservative Party	25,381	2.36	49	+3
Polish Democratic Party	9,340	0.87	6	0
Polish Anti-Semitic Party	6,720	0.62	6	New
Polish Liberal Party	5,621	0.52	3	–2
Polish National Party	3,282	0.31	1	New
Polish People's Party	2,744	0.26	4	+1
Polish Radical Party	854	0.08	1	0
Polish Farmers' Party	656	0.06	0	New
Polish Clerical Party	11	0.00	0	–1
Romanian Nation
Old Romanian Party	724	0.07	5	0
Conservative Romanian Party	347	0.03	0	New
Young Romanian Party	274	0.03	0	New
Moderate Romanian Party	198	0.02	0	New
Romanian People's Party	25	0.00	0	New
Radical Romanian Party	14	0.00	0	New
Ruthenian Nation
Ruthenian Radical Party	4,407	0.41	2	+1
Old Ruthenian Party	1,361	0.13	3	+2
Ruthenian Moderate Party	1,350	0.13	3	0
National Ruthenian Party	505	0.05	0	0
Young Ruthenian Party	462	0.04	1	–5
Ruthenian People’s Party	277	0.03	0	0
Moderate Young Ruthenian Independents	220	0.02	0	New
Conservative Ruthenian Party	129	0.01	0	0
Serbian Nation
Serb People's Party	186	0.02	2	0
Slovenian Nation
Slovenian Clerical Party	56,895	5.29	11	+3
Slovenian Liberal Party	20,492	1.90	5	+2
Slovenian National Party	10,989	1.02	0	–2
Slovenian Progressive Agrarian Party	1,649	0.15	0	New
Slovenian Conservative Party	557	0.05	0	–2
Slovenian Christian Social Party	171	0.02	0	New
Slovenian Pro-German Party	47	0.00	0	New
Other
Independents	3,478	0.32	1	0
Unknown/split votes	7,904	0.73	–	–
Total	1,075,984	100.00	425	0
Source: ANNO 1907 & ANNO 1901

=== By parliamentary grouping ===
The largest groups after the election were the Polish Club, the Young Czech Party and the German People's Party, which together had 164 seats.

The elections did not significantly alter relations in the Imperial Council and maintained the highly fragmented political spectrum. The Young Czech Party saw some weakening due to the formation of independent political parties such as Czech Agrarian Party and the Czech National Social Party. Czech National Socials represented a new trend in voter preferences, strengthening the nationalist forces. Significantly, they succeed Pan-German Association. These elections led to the weakening of the social democratic parties, with the Social Democrats gaining only 10 seats.

Compared with previous elections, turnout fell. In the 5th curia, under 30% of eligible voters voted. Historian Otto Urban interprets this as a result of the declining influence of the Council in Austrian political life. At the same time it was a more general change of attitude towards the elected legislative bodies.

The elections had no impact on the Government because the Cabinet of Ernest von Koerber had a mandate from its election in 1900 until 1904.

In early February 1901, the Imperial Council had 20 political groups:

Party	Seats	+/–
Poland Club	65	+6
Bohemian Club	44	–16
Association of German People's Parties	42	+1
Union of Constitutionalist Landowners	30	0
Centre Club	29	+23
German Progressive Union	27	–16
Christian Social Union	25	–1
Slavic Association	25	New
Group of Bohemian Conservative Landowners	19	0
Italian Union	18	New
Association of Social Democrats	11	–4
German Agrarian Parties	9	New
Free Association of Pan-Germans	8	New
Ruthenian Club	8	New
Union of Unaligned Bohemians	8	New
Club of Bohemian Agrarians	6	New
Yugoslavian Progressive Club	6	New
Polish People's Parties	5	+2
Romanian Club	5	0
Moravian Center Parties	3	New
Independents	32	+15
Total	425	0
Source: ANNO
