= Otto Steinwender =

Austrian politician and professor (1847–1921)

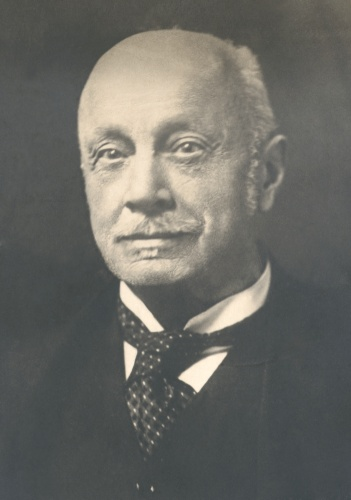
Otto Steinwender (1847–1921)

Otto Steinwender (17 February 1847 – 20 March 1921) was an Austrian politician and professor, initially of liberal tendency, who later developed more nationalistic and radical ideas like reaction to the government of Eduard Taaffe, 11th Viscount Taaffe. Steinwender became one of the most important figures of the pan-German movement in Austria and collaborated closely with Georg Ritter von Schönerer, from whom he would later move away due to political differences to found the German-National Party and its successor, the German People's Party. He was a member of the Carinthian Landtag and the House of Representatives and a member of the Provisional National Assembly and the Bundesrat. From 1918 to 1919 he was also Secretary of State for Finance in the Renner government.

== Life ==
After elementary school, Otto Steinwender attended high school in Klagenfurt, where he was a member of the Caranthania Klagenfurt school association, and subsequently studied at the law and philosophy faculties of the University of Vienna. During his studies he became a member of the Silesia Vienna fraternity in 1865. He passed the teaching examination for classical philology and German studies and received his doctorate in 1873. He then worked professionally as a professor for Latin and Greek at the Wiener Städtisches Gymnasium in Mariahilf, where he also published economic and political articles. He was also a co-founder of the German School Association and became a member of the Austrian House of Representatives in the Reichsrat in 1885. Furthermore, from 3 March 1892 he represented the towns and markets of Spittal an der Drau, Gmünd, Greifenburg, Obervellach and Oberdrauburg as a member of the Carinthian state, but in the last state election before the outbreak of the Great War, in 1909, he was elected to the state parliament as a representative of the general class of voters.

In 1891, after tensions and political differences, a schism finally occurred between Schönerer and Steinwender. Steinwender followed his own path and founded the German-National Party, more moderate than Schönerer's movement. Later this party was succeeded by the German People's Party in 1896, thanks to which it was able to achieve greater electoral results.

In the House of Representatives, Steinwender temporarily joined the Deutscher Nationalverband and served as vice president from 1909 to 1911. After the end of the war, Steinwender was a member of the Provisional National Assembly as a representative of the German National Party from 18 October 1918 to 16 February 1919. At the same time he was State Secretary for Finance from 30 October 1918 to 15 March 1919. He then represented the Greater German People's Party from 1 December 1920 until his death in the Bundesrat.

Otto Steinwender is valued as part of a less extreme wing of the pan-German movement of the time. In the tradition of the Freedom Party of Austria, he is seen today as a political "ancestor" who had managed the "balancing act" between the old liberals and the politically distant German nationalists. This is intended to construct a liberal traditional line of the FPÖ towards liberalism.

== See also ==
- List of members of the Austrian Parliament who died in office

Political offices
Preceded by N/A	Finance Minister of Austria; 1918–1919	Succeeded by Joseph Schumpeter
