= Karl Hermann Wolf =

Bohemian politician and journalist (1862–1941)

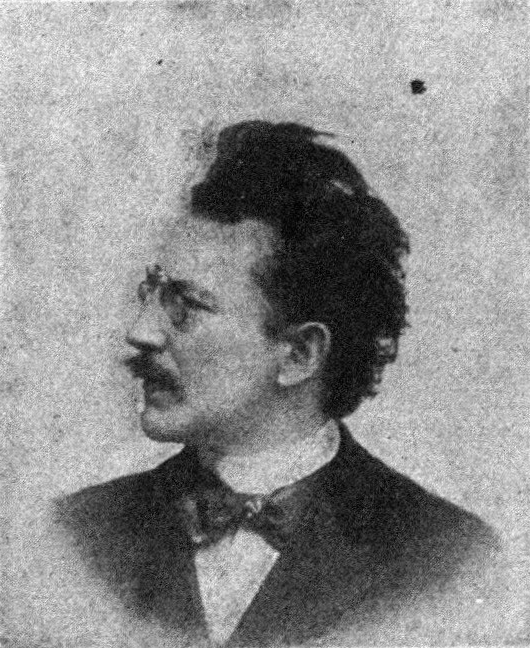
- Official portrait, 1897

Member of the Bohemian Diet
- In office 1923–1925

Personal details
- Born: 27 January 1862
- Died: 11 June 1941 (aged 79)
- Citizenship: Austria; Germany
- Party: German National Party and Großdeutsche Volkspartei

Karl Hermann Wolf (also spelled Carl Hermann Wolf; née Karl Georg Anton Wolf; 27 January 1862 – 11 June 1941) was a German Bohemian journalist, publicist and politician. At the turn of the 19th and 20th centuries, he was a member of the Czech Land Assembly and the Imperial Council; being one of the leaders of the Austrian pan-German movement.

== Life ==
Wolf was born on 7 January 1862 in Eger. After primary school, Wolf attended grammar school in Reichenberg, where he founded the Hercynia student association, graduated with "very excellent" as the best high school graduate and demonstrated extraordinary knowledge of ancient Greek. From 1880 he studied philology at Charles University in Prague, where he co-founded the Ghibelline fraternity in Prague (today in Saarbrücken), worked as a journalist, emphatically stood up for what he saw as oppressed Germans in the Austrian Habsburg monarchy and represented the ideas of the Greater Germany.

=== Professional background ===
Wolf was the author of numerous articles in the Deutsche Wacht, the Deutsche Volkszeitung, the Deutsches Volksblatt and chairman of the Deutschnationalen Vereines in Austria. On 30 October 1880, he founded the Ghibelline fraternity in Prague with high school graduates from Reichenberg. It described itself as an academic-technical fraternity, since it accepted students from the university and the technical college. Adolf Strachnov, who stayed in Prague from 1879, had prepared the founding and was the "First Speaker". Since his student days, Wolf called himself Karl Hermann instead of Karl Georg Anton, his original name, in homage to the Cheruscan prince Arminius.

In June 1881 he and Campen Kress were arrested in connection with the riots in Prague. Nevertheless, on 8 July Wolf became chairman of the reading and speaking hall for German students in Prague for three semesters. In a semester opening speech in front of the reading and speech hall of the German students, Wolf coined the sentence "The people are above the dynasty" and thus triggered a tumult in the face of the government representative. Due to an imminent lawsuit, he had to abandon his studies and fled to Leipzig. There he worked, among other things, on the Spamersche Konversationslexikon. In Leipzig he contracted life-threatening meningitis. After his recovery he was employed as a tutor and then turned to the newspaper business. After several years as a journalist in Cilli, Reichenberg and Vienna. In Vienna, he founded the Deutschnationale Zeitung in 1890 and, with the support of Georg Ritter von Schönerer, the Ostdeutsche Rundschau. This sheet was very popular among the nationally minded German-Austrians.

After his electoral defeat for the leadership of the reading and speaking hall of the German students, Karl Hermann Wolf founded the Germania reading and speaking association of German students in Prague in 1892 with the defeated nationally recruited students, which existed until 1938. The founding members were mainly students from the fraternities "Teutonia" and "Carolina", in which Wolf held honorary membership.

In the Reichsrat election in 1897 he was elected for the Deutschnationale Bewegung (9th legislative period). Wolf, von Schönerer and Anton Pergelt lodged an objection to the Baden Language Ordinance of 5 April. Wolf sharply attacked Kasimir Felix Badeni in the Reichsrat. He accused him of "Polish drudgery" and, subsequently, Wolf called for a pistol duel. Badeni accepted the duel, which took place on 25 September. Badeni lost that duel when he was shot in the arm. Wolf's political resistance in the Badeni crisis made him a national hero of German Bohemia for a while.

After the premature dissolution of the Reichsrat in 1901, Wolf was re-elected to the 10th legislative period and joined the Schönerer Group (Alldeutsche Vereinigung). Due to internal party conflicts (particularly over the Los von Rom movement), Karl Hermann Wolf, Raphael Pacher, Josef Herold and Anton Schalk left the von Schönerer group in 1902.

After the split they founded the Freialldeutsche Partei. By 1905, most members of the von Schönerer group joined the Wolf's Party, which changed its name to the Deutschradicale Partei. Wolf was re-elected to the Vienna Parliament in the 1907 Reichsrat election (XI legislative period) and in the 1911 Reichsrat election (XII legislative period). Wolf sat on the board of the Deutscher Nationalverband, founded in 1909, in which most of the German national elected officials had joined. During this time he often appeared publicly at nationalist events, including in the Wimberger Hall, where he was seen by the young Adolf Hitler.

Wolf died on 11 June 1941 in Vienna, at the age of 79.
