= 1911 Cisleithanian legislative election in the Kingdom of Dalmatia =

- 1911

All 11 Dalmatian seats in the Reichsrat
	First party	Second party	Third party
Party	People's Party	Party of Rights	Serb People's
Last election	6 seats	2 seats	2 seats
Seats won	5 / 11	4 / 11	2 / 11
Seat change	▼1	▲2	Steady

Elections to the Cisleithanian Imperial Council were held in the Kingdom of Dalmatia in 1911 to elect the eleven Dalmatian members of the Imperial Council as part of the wider Cisleithanian elections. The eleven members were elected from single-seat constituencies by universal male suffrage.

== Results ==
Party	Votes	%	Seats	+/–
Croatian Nation
People's Party	31,625	43.04	5	-1
Party of Rights	28,319	38.54	4	+2
Social Democratic Party of Croatia and Slavonia	329	0.45	0	New
Serbian Nation
Serb People's Party	11,460	15.60	2	0
Italian Nation
Autonomist Party	1,751	2.38	0	New
Total	73,484	100.00	11	0
Valid votes	73,484	99.86		
Invalid/blank votes	104	0.14		
Total votes	73,588	100.00		
Registered voters/turnout	144,213	51.03		
Source: ANNO

=== Elected lists and candidates ===
Croatian Party	Party of Rights	Serbian Party	Croatian People's Progressive Party
Vicko Ivčević; Pero Čingrija; Ante Tresić Pavičić; Juraj Biankini	Ivo Prodan; Josip Virgil Perić; Ante Dulibić; Ante Sesardić	Dušan Baljak; Gjuro Vukotić	Josip Smodlaka
