= Abgeordnetenhaus =

Several legislative bodies in German-speaking countries have been called Abgeordnetenhaus:

- Abgeordnetenhaus of Berlin, state parliament for the State of Berlin, Germany
- Abgeordnetenhaus (Prussia) (1850–1918), one of two parliamentary chambers for the Kingdom of Prussia
- Abgeordnetenhaus (Austria) (1867–1918), one of two chambers in the Austrian Imperial Council (Reichsrat) parliament

== See also ==
- House of Representatives
