= Innviertler Heimatblatt =

- Type: Weekly newspaper
- Publisher: NS-Gauverlag Oberdonau, Linkz
- Editor-in-chief: Jungreuthmayer (1939-1945)
- Founded: 1938
- Ceased publication: 1945
- Political alignment: Nazism
- Language: German language
- Headquarters: Ried im Innkreis

Innviertler Heimatblatt ("Innviertel Homeland-Paper") was a Nazi weekly newspaper published from Ried im Innkreis.

== History and profile ==
Innviertler Heimatblatt was published between 1938 and 1945. It was the organ of the NSDAP for the Innviertel region. Innviertel Heimatblatt substituted Innviertler Zeitung, which had been published from 1918 and had been the organ of the German People's Party in Innviertel.

In 1945 Innviertel Heimatblatt was substituted by Innviertler Volkszeitung, which was discontinued in the same year.

== Editors ==
The editors of Innviertel Heimatblatt included the following:

1938	Harald Schreiner
28 July 1938 – 19 May 1939	Hans Peham
20 May 1939 – 4 August 1939	Felix Scherr
5 August 1939 – 1945	Jungreuthmayer
