= German Radical Party =

German Radical Party Deutschradikale Partei
- Leader: Karl Hermann Wolf
- Founded: 1902
- Dissolved: 1920
- Split from: Pan-German League
- Merged into: Greater German People's Party (Austria); German National Party (Czechoslovakia)
- Ideology: Pan-Germanism; German nationalism Anti-slavic sentiment Anti-clericalism; Antisemitism
- Political position: Right-wing to Far-right
- National affiliation: Deutscher Nationalverband

The German Radical Party (German: Deutschradikale Partei), until 1907 the Free Pan-German Party (Freialldeutsche Partei), was a German nationalist political party in Austria-Hungary, active mainly in Bohemia.

== History ==
After the electoral success of the Pan-German League (Alldeutsche Vereinigung) in the 1901 Imperial Council elections, there was a split between party leader Georg von Schönerer and the moderate Karl Hermann Wolf. Although von Schönerer placed racist and anti-Semitic ideology at the center of his politics and was strongly opposed to the Habsburg monarchy and the Catholic Church, for Wolf and many other supporters of the Pan-German League, the German-Czech national conflict was the priority. In addition, there were personal disagreements between Wolf and von Schönerer. In 1902 Wolf finally broke away from the Pan-German League and founded the Free Pan-German Party, in which he could count on the support of German-speaking followers from Bohemia, Moravia and Austrian Silesia, as well as some Pan-German League deputies in the Imperial Council. For example, five members of the Moravian Regional Assembly joined the new party.

While the Free Pan-German Party continued to represent a völkisch polity of German nationality, their anti-Semitic attitude was more relaxed, and the destruction of the Habsburg monarchy was no longer openly demanded. Rather, the Free Pan-German Party saw itself as representing the interests of the German-speaking people in the Habsburg Monarchy, and therefore did not shy away from soliciting Jewish votes.

The Free Pan-German Party was always more successful in elections than the Pan-German League and, together with the German Agrarian Party, became the strongest pan-Germanist party in Bohemia. Following the electoral success of the Free Pan-German Party in the 1907 Imperial Council elections, the party changed its name to the "German Radical Party" that same year. From 1910 he worked with other German nationalist parties in the Reichsrat in the German National Association. In 1920 the German Radical Party finally merged into the Greater German People's Party.
