= Czech Constitutionalist Progressive Party =

Liberal Czech political party in Austria-Hungary (1909-1918)

Czech Constitutionalist Progressive Party Česká strana státoprávně pokroková
- Leader: Antonín Hajn
- Founded: 20 April 1908
- Dissolved: 10 February 1918
- Merger of: Czech Radical; Progressive Party; Czech Constitutionalist; Radical Party
- Merged into: Czech Constitutional Democracy
- Headquarters: Prague
- Newspaper: Samostatnost; Pokroková revue
- Ideology: Constitutionalism; Progressivism; Liberalism

The Czech Constitutionalist Progressive Party (Czech: Česká strana státoprávně pokroková) was a Czech political party in Austria-Hungary. The party was established in April 1909 by a merger of the Czech Radical Progressive Party and the Czech Constitutionalist Radical Party. The first leader of the party was Antonín Hajn, former leader of the Radical Progressives. The party spokesman was Lev Borský.

== Program ==
The party was a radical upholder of the rights of the Lands of the Bohemian Crown and supporter of democratization and economic reforms. The party ideology was liberalism, drawing inspiration from the ideas of the American Revolution and the liberal democracy the party saw in the United States. In May 1914, the party published a "Manifesto to Europe" where it proclaimed support to the Triple Entente. During World War I, the party was suspended. Many party members joined the Czech resistance in the Maffia organization.

In February 1918 the party merged into the Czech Constitutional Democracy which was later succeeded by the Czechoslovak National Democracy.

== Electoral results ==
Imperial Council
Election year	# of overall votes	% of overall vote	# of overall seats won	+/–	Leader
1911	20,881	0.46	4 / 516	▲3	Antonín Hajn
