= 1911 Cisleithanian legislative election =

Austrian elections in Austria-Hungary

- June & July 1911

All 516 seats in the Imperial Council 259 seats needed for a majority
- Turnout: 80.20%
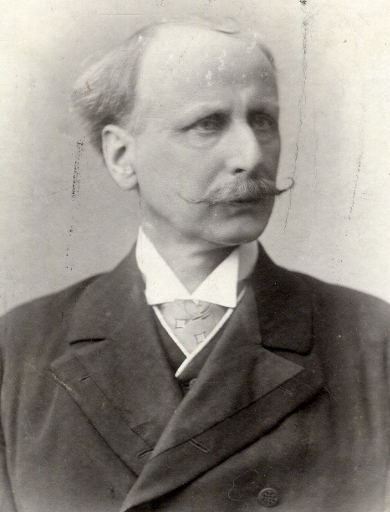

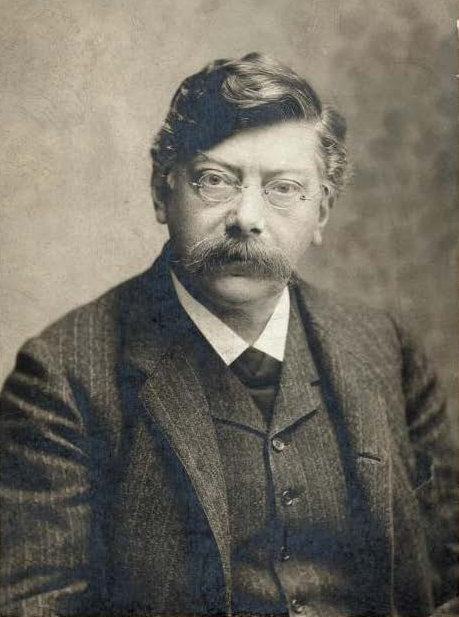

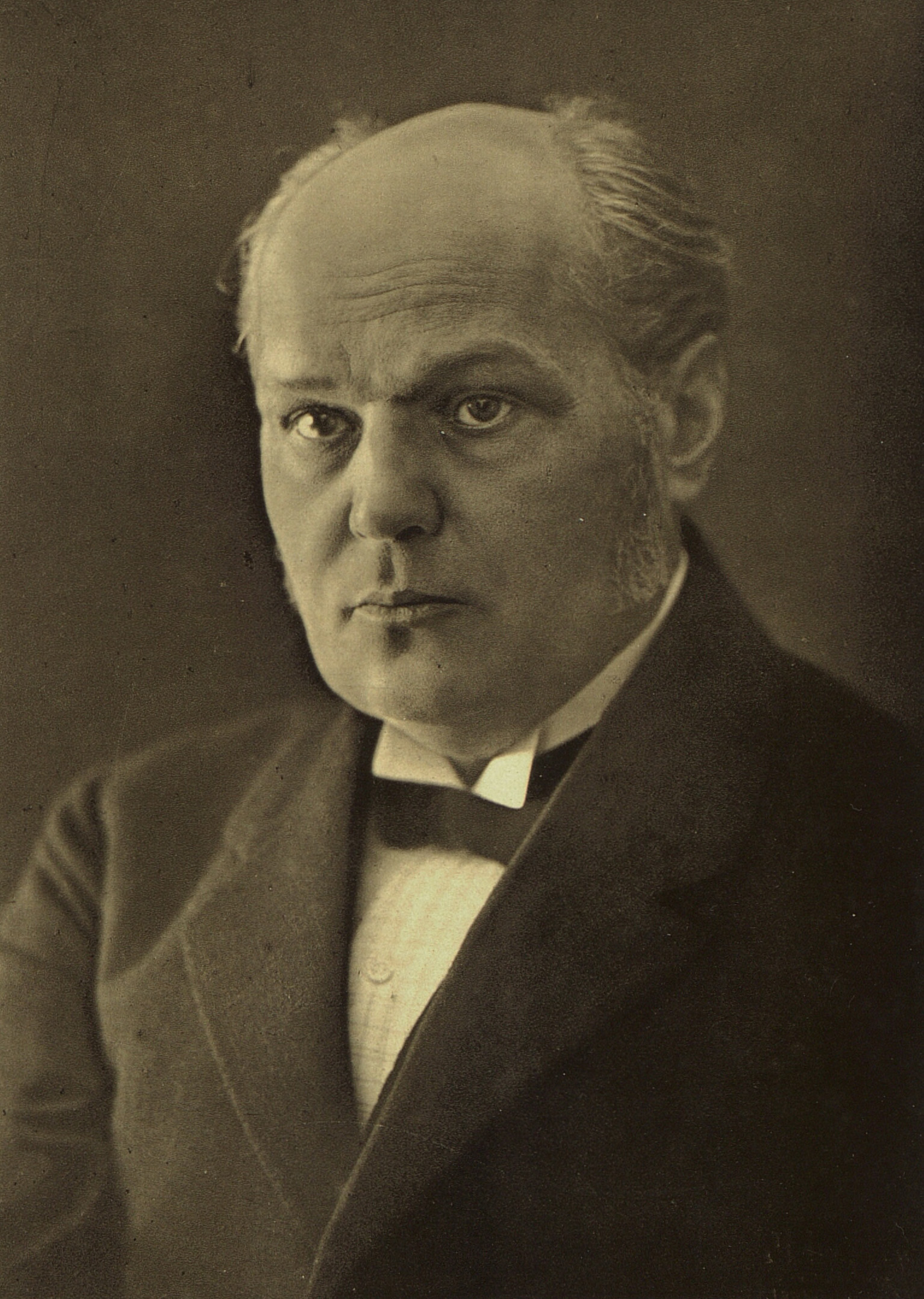

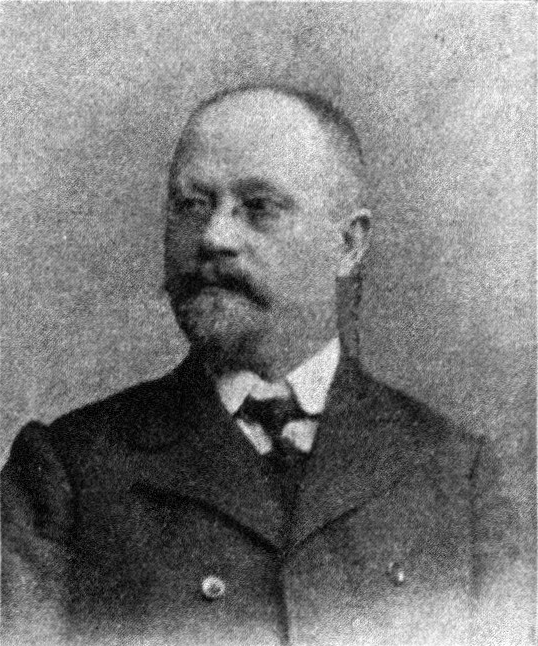

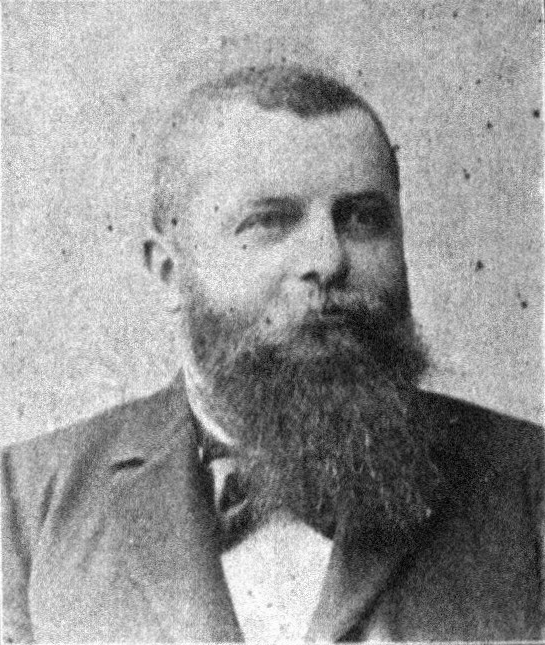

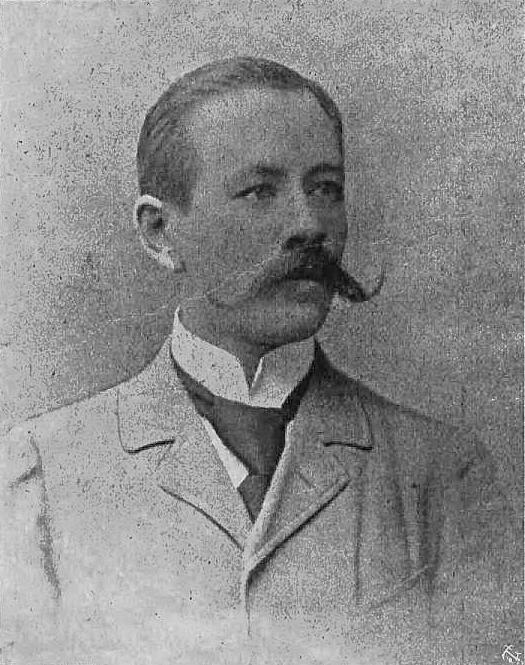
	First party	Second party	Third party
Leader	Prince Louis	Victor Adler	Antonín Švehla
Party	CS	SPÖ	RSZML
Alliance	Christian Social Union	Club of German Social Democrats	Uniform Bohemian Club
Last election	65 seats, 11.73%	50 seats, 11.12%	27 seats, 4.48%
Seats won	75	46	36
Seat change	▲10	▼4	▲9
Popular vote	608,346	542,549	257,717
Percentage	13.41%	11.96%	5.68%
Swing	▲1.68pp	▲0.84pp	▲1.20pp
	Fourth party	Fifth party	Sixth party
Leader	Antonín Němec	Gustav Groß	Jan Stapiński
Party	ČSSD	DFP	PSL
Alliance	Club of Bohemian Social Democrats	German National Association	Poland Club
Last election	22 seats, 8.45%	19 seats, 2.24%	16 seats, 3.60%
Seats won	25	25	24
Seat change	▲3	▲6	▲8
Popular vote	357,234	71,114	185,674
Percentage	7.87%	1.57%	4.09%
Swing	▼0.58pp	▼0.67pp	▲0.49pp
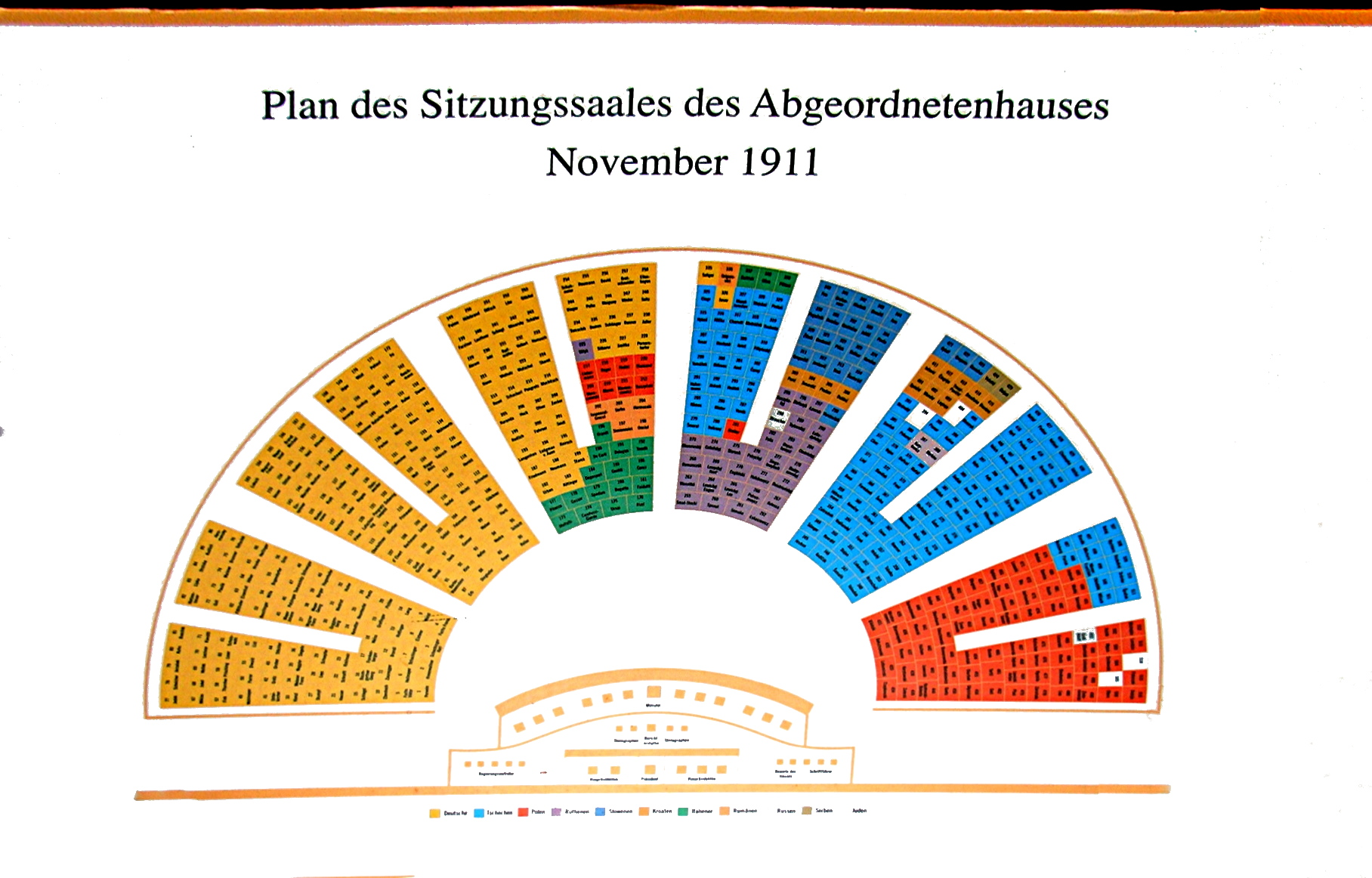
- Seats of the House of Deputies of the Imperial Austro-Hungarian Council. Situation after the November 1911 Cisleithanian legislative elections. The seats are marked by nationality.
Minister-President of Cisleithania before election
Richard von Bienerth-Schmerling
Independent
Elected Minister-President of Cisleithania
Paul Gautsch von Frankenthurn
CS

Legislative elections to elect members of the Imperial Council were held in Cisleithania, the Austrian section of Austria-Hungary over several days in June and July 1911. A coalition of German national and liberal parties, the Deutscher Nationalverband, emerged as the largest bloc in Parliament, holding 100 of the 516 seats. Voter turnout was 80.2%.

This was the second election under universal male suffrage, and the last before the dissolution of the empire as a result of World War I. At that dissolution it was the German representatives that formed the first truly Austrian legislative body of the Republic of German-Austria.

In the German-speaking areas the results however were similar to the previous elections in 1907, with the Christian Socials as the largest party (76 seats), followed by the Social Democrats (43) and the German People's Party (32). Both the major parties lost seats, and the parties which gained were the moderate centre and the radicals. Results varied by province, with Lower Austria providing the political base for the two largest parties. There was a wide difference between rural areas (Christian Social) and urban (Social Democrat), a split (social cleavage) that had become more evident since 1907, with the Christian Socials losing their support in the outer belt of Viennese districts. Support for the German People's Party was more even. The German People's Party found its support in the middle strata of Austrian society. On the other hand, industrialists rejected this party in favour of the Freisinnige group, particularly the German Progressive Party, as did the more prosperous merchants.

Among the non-German nationalities, the results also differed widely between nations.

== Results ==
Party	Votes	%	Seats
Croatian Nation
People's Party	33,565	0.74	5
Pure Party of Rights	28,254	0.62	4
Croatian Nationalists	20,770	0.46	3
Social Democratic Party of Croatia and Slavonia	329	0.01	0
Czech Nation
Social Democratic Party (Autonomists)	357,234	7.87	25
Czech Agrarian Party	257,717	5.68	37
Catholic-National Conservative Parties in Bohemia and Moravia	128,056	2.82	7
Czech National Social Party	95,901	2.11	13
Christian Social Parties in Bohemia and Moravia	83,124	1.83	0
Young Czech Party	56,673	1.25	14
Czech Progressive People's Party	34,443	0.76	5
Czech Constitutionalist Progressive Party	20,881	0.46	4
Social Democratic Party (Centralists)	19,374	0.43	1
Czech Independents	10,832	0.24	1
Old Czech Party	9,872	0.22	1
Paper candidates	9,836	0.22	0
Czech Realist Party	4,984	0.11	0
Officials’ Party	3,201	0.07	0
Czech National Party	1,893	0.04	0
German Nation
Christian Social Party	608,346	13.41	75
Social Democratic Party	542,549	11.96	44
Agrarian Party	106,548	2.35	22
German Radical Party	90,523	2.00	22
German People's Party	71,882	1.58	21
German Progressive Party	71,114	1.57	15
Deutschfreiheitliche Partei (Note: Candidates that ran under the German Freedom Party and German-National Party labels were members of either the German People's Party or the German Progressive Party, which ran as a joint list in certain constituencies.)	66,738	1.47	15
German-National Party	28,689	0.63	5
German Workers' Party	26,670	0.59	3
Upper Austrian Farmers' Club	22,009	0.49	0
Pan-German Association	20,527	0.45	4
German Miners and Farmers' Association	15,301	0.34	0
German Independents	14,934	0.33	2
German Conservatives	14,597	0.32	0
Independent Christian Socials	10,299	0.23	1
Paper candidates	7,569	0.17	0
Central Industrial Committee	6,422	0.14	0
Free Socialists	4,074	0.09	1
German Conservative Farmers' Party	3,623	0.08	0
Imperial Economic Policy Party	2,885	0.06	1
Social Politicians	2,735	0.06	1
German Economic Party	1,893	0.04	0
Italian Nation
Italian Liberal Party	41,928	0.92	5
Italian People's Party	40,543	0.89	10
Italian Social Democratic Party	23,068	0.51	3
Italian National-Liberal Party	5,925	0.13	1
Italian Liberal Farmers' Association	3,685	0.08	0
Italian Independents	436	0.01	0
Democratic Party	321	0.01	0
Jewish Candidates
Jewish National Party	31,781	0.70	1
Polish Nation
Polish People's Party	185,674	4.09	24
Polish Conservative Party	137,199	3.02	17
Polish National Democratic Party	98,460	2.17	10
Polish Democratic Party	84,181	1.86	13
Polish Social Democratic Party of Galicia and Cieszyn Silesia	64,569	1.42	8
Polish Independents	38,028	0.84	3
Polish Centre Party	23,139	0.51	1
Galician Christian Social Party (Note: Ran as the Polish Clerical Party in Silesia.)	21,982	0.48	3
Independent Socialists	6,515	0.14	2
Polish Pro-German Party	5,902	0.13	0
Independent Democrats	4,302	0.09	1
Polish Progressive Democratic Party	2,933	0.06	1
Romanian Nation
Romanian National (Defense) Party	38,408	0.85	4
Romanian National (Democratic) Party	11,810	0.26	1
Romanian Independents	5,728	0.13	0
Ruthenian Nation
Ukrainian Party–Young Ruthenian Party	326,955	7.21	23
Russian National Party	128,160	2.82	2
Ukrainian Radical Party	54,701	1.21	5
Ukrainian Social Democratic Party	21,618	0.48	1
Serbian Nation
Serb People's Party	11,460	0.25	2
Slovenian Nation
Slovene People's Party	54,089	1.19	10
Slovene Christian Social Party (Note: Ran as the Slovenian Clerical Party in Styria and Gorizia and Gradisca.)	43,203	0.95	10
Slovene Liberal Party	33,170	0.73	2
Slovenian Nationalists	16,858	0.37	1
Slovene Social Democratic Party (Note: Ran as the Yugoslavian Social Democratic Party in Carniola.)	14,368	0.32	0
Slovenian Pro-Germans	5,260	0.12	0
Slovenian Independents	3,408	0.08	0
Unknown or split
Unknown or split votes	30,453	0.67	–
Total	4,537,086	100.00	516
Valid votes	4,537,086	98.10	
Invalid/blank votes	87,996	1.90	
Total votes	4,625,082	100.00	
Registered voters/turnout	5,767,065	80.20	
Source: ANNO

=== By parliamentary grouping ===
Party	Seats	+/–
Deutscher Nationalverband	100	+49
Uniform Bohemian Club	84	New
Christian Social Union	73	–23
Poland Club	70	+15
Club of German Social Democrats	49	–1
Ukrainian Association	28	+3
Croatian-Slovenian Club	27	New
Club of Bohemian Social Democrats	25	+1
Latin Union	21	New
Club of Polish Social Democrats	9	+3
Dalmatian Club	7	New
Independents	23	+11
Total	516	0
Source: Nohlen & Stöver

== See also ==
- List of political parties in Austria
- 1911 Cisleithanian legislative election in the Czech lands
- 1911 Cisleithanian legislative election in the Kingdom of Dalmatia

== Bibliography ==
- Arthur Neal Mangham (1974). The social bases of Austrian politics: The German electoral districts of Cisleithania, 1900–1917.
