= House of Deputies (Austria) =

Lower house of the Parliament of Cisleithania, Austria-Hungary (1861–1918)

House of Deputies Abgeordnetenhaus
- Lesser coat of arms of Cisleithania (1915–1918)

Type
- Type: Lower house of the Imperial Council (Austria)

Leadership
- President: Gustav Groß (last)
- Seats: 516 (from 1907)

Meeting place
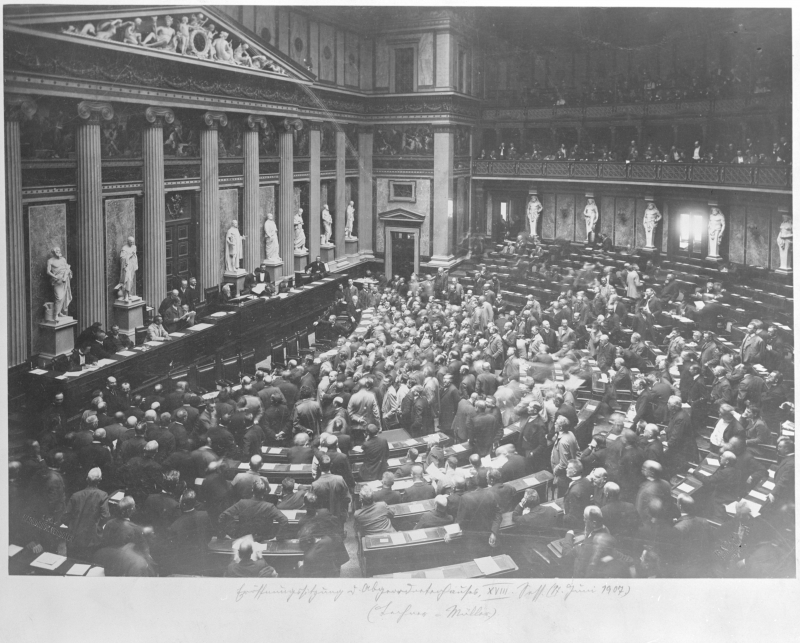
- Debating chamber of the House of Deputies; Austrian Parliament Building; Vienna

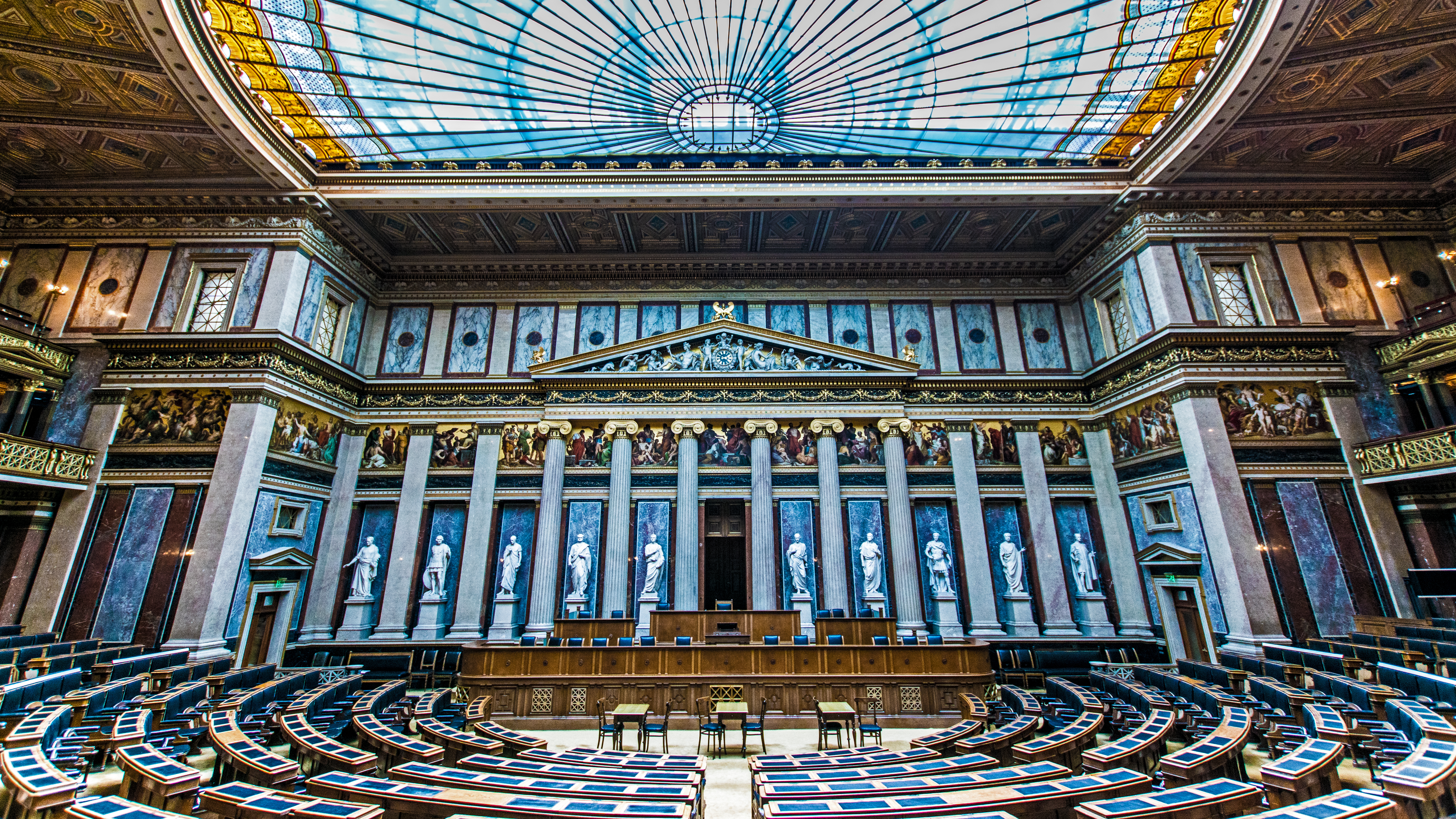
Plenary hall of the House of Deputies in the Austrian Parliament Building in Vienna

The House of Deputies (German: Abgeordnetenhaus, Czech: Poslanecká sněmovna, Polish: Izba Posłów, Italian: Camera dei deputati) was, from 1861, the lower house of the bicameral Imperial Council parliament of the Austrian Empire and, from 1867 to 1918, of the Cisleithanian lands within Austria-Hungary. The upper chamber was the House of Lords.

== History ==
The first provisional chamber of deputies established in Austria was held in 1861 in the Währinger Straße in Vienna, in the building referred to as the " Schmerling Theater " which was used until 1883 to accommodate parliamentary meetings. In 1867 the first allocations of seats were established among parliamentarians who were framed in the number of 203: 54 Bohemians, 38 Galicians, 22 Moravians and 18 Austrians. A subsequent electoral reform of 1873 brought the number of members from 203 to 353 also to open up this lower house more to the bourgeoisie and to favor the greater participation of non-aristocratic social classes in government operations.

The deputies were elected for a six-year term of office. The internal distribution of seats was also divided on the basis of professions, reaching to include 85 members belonging to the landlord class, 21 between traders and artisans, 128 representatives of the rural class and 118 citizen deputies (with the clause, however, of the payment of taxes continuously for 10 years). In total, the political class of the Chamber of Deputies gathered 6% of the adult population of the Empire. On June 14, 1896, the number of members was increased to 425 after the introduction of universal suffrage. Voters were again increased on January 21, 1907 to 516.

As was the case for the upper house, the Austrian chamber of deputies gathered only the deputies of the Cisleitania region, that is the part of the empire with the exception of the Hungarian area which also enjoyed its own separate parliament since 1867 although gathered under the imperial crown.

With the government of Prime Minister Count Eduard Taaffe, based on a strong centralization in Austro-German politics, it indelibly marked the decline of the parliamentary institution as a place of convention for the different nationalities of the Empire and after 1893 no government could maintain constant support of the majority in the imperial chamber of deputies.

== The parliament and the emperor ==
The Emperor Franz Joseph, who initially ruled absolutely, had long-standing suspicions against the parliament, and the parliament did not take kindly to his autocracy. The Emperor visited the parliament only twice during his reign, in the ceremony of the inauguration of the building, but this essentially due to the fact that the parliament presented itself to the imperial court as a puppet element, while the power still remained firmly linked to the figure of the sovereign.
