= Gustav Groß =

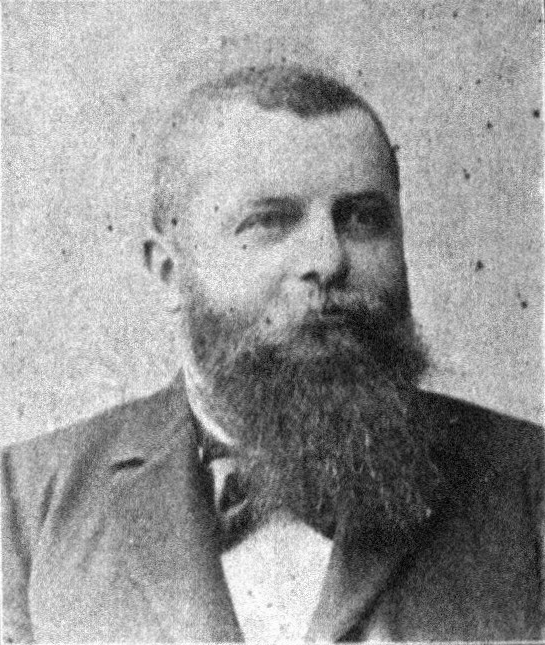
A portrait of Groß from around 1907

Gustav Groß (1856–1935) was a national liberal German Bohemian politician.

== Life ==
Gustav Groß was born on 12 June 1856 at Reichenberg in the Kingdom of Bohemia, a part of the Austrian Empire. His father, Gustav Robert Groß, was a railway industrialist, and a participant in the Frankfurt Parliament, as part of the 1848 revolutions across the German Confederation. Gustav Groß studied political economics at the universities of Vienna and Berlin. From 1877 to 1881, he was a political official in the province of Lower Austria and from 1885, a privatdozent (independent professor) of political economics at the University of Vienna. He later moved to Iglau, and became a member of the Diet of the Margraviate of Moravia. In 1889, he was elected to the House of Deputies (German: Abgeordnetenhaus), the lower house of the Imperial Council. He represented the city of Iglau as a German liberal. Whilst in the House of Deputies, he became a spokesman for all ethnic Germans in the council. He was a member of the German School League, and was chairman of the League from 1885. Groß was also a biographer of Karl Marx .

From 1911, Groß was chairman of the Deutscher Nationalverband, a broad coalition of German nationalist and liberal political parties that was formed to contest the 1911 election to the Imperial Council. The Deutscher Nationalverband swept to victory in that election. Despite this, the council was suspended after the breakout of the First World War in 1914. Groß would later serve as president of the House of Deputies in 1917–1918, during the last days of Austria-Hungary, towards the end of the war. In his function as president of the House of Deputies, Gustav Groß delivered the "nine minute closing address" at the session on 12 November 1918, the day after the abdication of Emperor Charles I. As proposed by Groß, a motion "to vote for no day for the next session" (keinen Tag für die nächste Sitzung zu bestimmen) was passed. After ten minutes, the session was finished, and so was the Imperial Council. On the following day, the council was replaced by the "Provisional National Assembly", which proclaimed the Republic of German-Austria.

As chairman of the Greater German People's Party, Groß was a member of the Provisional National Assembly from 21 October 1918 to 16 February 1919. He represented Germans in Moravia, who ultimately were not able to remain part of German Austria, as this was forbidden by the Allied powers. Instead, the new Czecho-Slovak Republic, which had military occupied the lands inhabited by Germans in Moravia and Bohemia, was granted these lands. Germans in these lands were not allowed to participate in the election of the Austrian Constitutional Assembly in 1919. The proposal by Vienna to appoint German MPs for these regions had to be discarded.

Groß died on 23 February 1935 in Vienna.

== Works ==
- Die Lehre vom Unternehmergewinn. Duncker & Humblot, Leipzig, 1884
- Gustav Groß (1884). "Marx, Karl" . Allgemeine Deutsche Biographie (in German). Vol. 20. Leipzig: Duncker & Humblot. pp. 541–549.
- Karl Marx: Eine Studie. Duncker & Humblot, Leipzig, 1885
- Wirtschaftsformen und Wirtschaftsprinzipien. Ein Beitrag zur Lehre von Organisation der Volkswirtschaft. Duncker & Humblot, Leipzig, 1888
- Die Internationale des Geistes. Arbeitsgemeinschaft für staatsbürgerliche u. wirtschaftliche Bildung, Berlin, 1919
- Die internationalen Agrarkrisen nach dem Kriege. Kern & Birner, Frankfurt a.M., 1933

== Literature ==
- Groß, Gustav. In: Der große Brockhaus in 12 Bänden. 16. Aufl., Band 5, Gp – Iz, Wiesbaden 1954
- "Gross, Gustav". In: Österreichisches Biographisches Lexikon 1815–1950 (ÖBL). Vol. 2, Austrian Academy of Sciences, Vienna 1959, p. 73.
- Brigitte Deschka: Dr. Gustav Groß, phil. Diss., Wien 1966
