= Austrian Newspapers Online =

AustriaN Newspapers Online
- ANNO
- Website type: Retrodigitalisation and online database of Austrian newspapers and periodicals
- Available in: de (ISO639 German)
- Creator: Austrian National Library
- Website: http://anno.onb.ac.at/
- Commercial: no
- Registration: no
- Launched: 2003

AustriaN Newspapers Online (ANNO) is a project run by the Austrian National Library (Österreichische Nationalbibliothek) for the conservation of historic newspapers, whereby particularly important and popular newspapers are scanned in and made available on the Internet. By the end of 2009 ANNO had about 4.76 million digitized pages.

== Digitalised newspapers ==
The range of papers is constantly being expanded.

- Agramer Zeitung
- Akademische Frauenblätter
- Allgemeine Automobil Zeitung
- Allgemeine Bauzeitung
- Allgemeine Eisenbahn-Zeitung
- Allgemeine musikalische Zeitung
- Allgemeine land- und forstwirthschaftliche Zeitung
- Allgemeine Sport-Zeitung
- Der Alpenfreund
- An der Schönen Blauen Donau
- Die Arbeit
- Anzeiger für die Region Bludenz
- Arbeiterinnen-Zeitung
- Der Architekt
- Badener Bezirks-Blatt
- Badener Zeitung
- Bade- und Reise-Journal
- Der Bauernbündler
- Belehrendes und Unterhaltendes
- Berichte der Arbeiterkammer Wien
- Bildungsarbeit
- Bregenzer Tagblatt
- Bregenzer Wochenblatt
- Brünner Hebammen-Zeitung
- Bukowinaer Post
- Bukowinaer Rundschau
- Cetinjer Zeitung
- Christlich-sociale Arbeiter-Zeitung
- Cook's Welt-Reise-Zeitung
- Czernowitzer Allgemeine Zeitung
- Die Debatte
- Deutsch-Englischer-Reise-Courier
- Die bildenden Künste
- Die Bombe
- Deutsche Musik-Zeitung
- Deutsche Zeitung
- Deutsches Südmährenblatt
- Dillinger's Reisezeitung
- Eideseis dia ta anatolika mere
- Elleknikos teklegraphos
- Ephemeris
- Europa Motor
- Forstzeitung
- Der Floh
- Die Frau
- Feldkircher Anzeiger
- Feldkircher Wochenblatt
- Frauenarbeit und Frauenrecht
- Frauenbote
- Frau und Volk
- Freies Blatt
- Freies Wiener Montagblatt
- Freiheit
- Fremden-Blatt
- Der Fremdenverkehr
- Fremden-Zeitung
- Die Gartenlaube für österreich
- Gerichts-Zeitung
- Gesundheits-Zeitung
- Die Hausfrau
- Die Hausgehilfin
- Hebammen-Zeitung
- Der Humorist
- Hellenikos telegraphos
- Hermes ho logios
- Illustrierte Fremden-Zeitung
- Illustrierte Wochenpost
- Illustrierte Österreichische Alpenzeitung
- Illustriertes Oesterreichisches Journal
- Illustriertes Österreichisches Sportblatt
- Internationale Austellungs-Zeitung
- Internationale Reisezeitung
- Innsbrucker Nachrichten (Tiroler Tageszeitung)
- Jahrbuch des Vorarlberger Landesmuseumsvereins
- Janus
- Jörgel Briefe
- Juristische Blätter
- Der jüdische Arbeiter
- Jüdische Korrespondenz
- Jüdische Presse
- Jüdische Volksstimme
- KFO-Arbeit
- Katholische Frauenzeitung
- Kikeriki
- Klagenfurter Zeitung
- Das Kleine Blatt
- Das Kleine Frauenblatt
- Krakauer Tagblatt (Dziennik Krakowski)
- Kremser Feuerwehr-Zeitung
- Die Lokomotive
- Die Lyra
- Mädchenhort
- Mährisches Tagblatt
- Marchfeldbote (Volksbote, Der Wähler)
- Der Militärarzt
- Mitteilungen der Gesellschaft für Salzburger Landeskunde
- Mitteilungen der Vereinigung der arbeitenden Frauen
- Moderne Frau
- Montags-Zeitung
- Monfort
- Morgen-Post
- Neue Freie Presse
- Neues 8-Uhr-Blatt
- Neues Fremden-Blatt
- Neues Wiener Journal
- Neues Wiener Tagblatt
- Die Neue Zeitung
- Neuigkeits-Welt-Blatt
- Neues Fremden-Blatt
- Neue Warte am Inn
- Neue Wiener Musik-Zeitung
- Österreichische Alpen-Zeitung
- Österreichische Alpen-post
- Österreichische Anwalts-Zeitung
- Oesterreichische Arbeiter-Zeitung
- Österreichische Bauzeitung
- Österreichische Frauenrundschau
- Die österreichische Hausfrau
- Österreichische illustrierte Zeitung
- Oesterreichische Volks-Zeitung
- Österreichs Frauenzeitung
- Österreichische Musik- und Theaterzeitung
- Österreichischer Motor
- Österreichische Touring-Zeitung
- Österreichische Touristenzeitung
- Pester Lloyd
- Philologikos telegraphos
- Prager Tagblatt
- Reichspost
- Reichs-Organ der Arbeiter-Radfahrer
- Reise und Sport
- Sonntagsblätter (inkl. Wiener Abendzeitung)
- Soziale Sicherheit
- Sport-Tagblatt
- Sport im Bild
- Sport & Salon
- Die Stimme
- Statistisches Jahrbuch der Stadt Wien
- Theaterzettel (Oper und Burgtheater in Wien)
- Die Unzufriedene
- Das Vaterland
- Vaterländische Blätter für den österreichischen Kaiserstaat
- Ver Sacrum
- Volksblatt für Stadt und Land
- Volksbote
- Volks-Zeitung
- Vorarlberger Tagblatt
- Vorarlberger Volksblatt
- Vorarlberger Wacht
- Die Waffen nieder!
- Die Wähler
- (Neuigkeits) Welt Blatt
- Wiener allgemeine Zeitung
- Wiener Bilder
- Wiener Caricaturen
- Wiener Hausfrauen-Zeitung
- Wiener Landwirtschaftliche Zeitung
- Wiener Medizinische Wochenschrift
- Wiener Moden- und Hauswesen-Zeitung
- Wiener Moden Zeitung
- Wiener Montags-Post
- Wiener neueste Nachrichten
- Wiener Sonn- und Montags-Zeitung
- Wiener Vororte-Zeitung
- Wiener Vorstadt-Presse
- Wiener Woche
- Wienerwald-Bote (inkl. Neulengbacher Zeitung)
- Wiener Zeitung (Wienerisches Diarium)
- zeitgeschichte
- Zeitung für Land- und Forstwirthschaft

== Literature ==
- ANNO – AustriaN Newspapers Online. A digitisation initiative of the Austrian National Library. Ein Vortrag bei der Postkonferenz "Newspapers and the press in Central and Eastern Europe: access and preservation" bei der 69. IFLA Konferenz im August 2003 in Berlin. Präsentation (Powerpoint, 1,2 MB; deutsch)
- Massendigitalisierung von Bibliotheksbeständen. Allgemeines am Beispiel "ANNO – AustriaN Newspapers Online" – einer Initiative der Österreichischen Nationalbibliothek. Ein Vortrag von Wilhelm Dikovich und Christa Müller am 28. Österreichischen Bibliothekartag in Linz am 22. September 2004. Präsentation (Powerpoint, 0,9 MB; deutsch)
