= Deutscher Nationalverband =

German National Association Deutscher Nationalverband
- President: Karl Chiari
- Vice Presidents: Julius Sylvester; Hans Damm; Gustav Groß; Karl Hermann Wolf
- Founded: February 1910
- Dissolved: 1917
- Ideology: Austro–German nationalism National liberalism

The Deutscher Nationalverband (lit. German National Association) was a loose coalition of ethnic German national and liberal political parties in Cisleithania, a part of Austria-Hungary. It was formed to contest the 1911 election of the lower house of the Imperial Council (German: Reichsrat) of Cisleithania. Loose coalitions of this type were common in the Imperial Council. It comprised ten individual parties, including the German People's Party, German Progress Party, German Radical Party, and German Agrarian Party.

The Nationalverband managed to gain 104 seats at the 1911 election, making it the largest bloc in the Imperial Council, and ousting the previously dominant Christian Social Party. It relied on voters from areas of ethnic strife, such as in the Kingdom of Bohemia and the Duchy of Styria, but received very few votes in the Imperial capital, Vienna. A plan for the division of Bohemia on ethnic lines was put forth by the bloc, but the outbreak of the First World War stopped any further discussion of administrative reform.

Gustav Gross, chairman of the Nationalverband, was in favour of the war, as he thought it could be used as a tool to reorganise the empire and entrench German dominance. He wrote in August 1914 that, after a quick victory, peace negotiations could be used to establish German as the official language of the state, and also to detach the largely Slavic-speaking kingdoms of Dalmatia and Galicia from Cisleithania. Gross's leadership was viewed as inept and moderate by younger members of the Nationalverband, especially because of his willingness to collaborate with the Christian Socialists in a war-time government. This led to infighting and factionalism within the bloc, and various splinter groups with more extreme aims were formed. As the bloc was always a very loose coalition with little internal unity, this infighting ultimately led to its disintegration in 1917, at the height of the First World War. It split into seventeen separate parties.
