= Der jüdische Arbeiter (Vienna) =

Labour Zionist newspaper in Austria (1927–1934)

- Type: Biweekly (1927-1933), Weekly (1933-1934)
- Editor-in-chief: Julius Mamber
- Founded: 1927
- Ceased publication: 1934
- Political alignment: Labour Zionism
- Language: German language
- Headquarters: Vienna

Der jüdische Arbeiter (The Jewish Worker) was a Labour Zionist newspaper published from Vienna 1927–1934. It was the organ of the Poale Zion organization in Austria. It substituted the Poale Zion publication Unsere Tribüne (published 1924–1926). It was initially published once every two weeks, but became a weekly in 1933. Julius Mamber was the editor of Der jüdische Arbeiter.
