= Away from Rome! =

Pan-German religious movement

Away from Rome! (German: Los-von-Rom-Bewegung) was a religious movement founded in Austria by the Pan-German politician Georg Ritter von Schönerer aimed at conversion of all Roman Catholic German-speaking people in Austria to Lutheran Protestantism or, in some cases, an Old Catholic Church. It was founded amid the ensuing Kulturkampf in Imperial Germany.

== Origins ==
"Away from Rome" (German: Los-von-Rom-Bewegung) was a religious movement founded in Austria around 1900. Mostly politically influenced, the movement aimed at supporting change of confession from the Roman Catholic to either the Evangelical Lutheran or the Old Catholic denomination. It was supported by German National forces.

The slogan "Away from Rome" was coined by Theodor Georg Rakus, a medical student, who would later become Dr. Theodor Georg Rakus, physician and royal Swedish vice consul in Salzburg, and a companion of Georg von Schönerer.

== Background: Greater German and German national ideas ==
Since the time of Counter-Reformation among the Habsburgs, Austria was almost exclusively Roman Catholic. The Protestants formed only a vanishing minority in the country. Only after Emperor Joseph II enacted the Patent of Tolerance in 1781 was the exercise of religion once again granted to Reformed Christians and Lutherans. After the foundation of the German Reich in 1871 realized the "Lesser German solution,"—that is, the unification of Germany, excluding Austria, under the control of Prussia—many Austrians still remained devoted to "Greater German" ideas. German nationalists within Austria strived for a close political connection to the German Reich, and partially even aimed at complete dissolution of the monarchy of the Habsburgs and the annexation of the parts that were populated by the Germans to the German Reich. One of the leading advocates of this political tendency was Georg Ritter von Schönerer. In the program of Linz in 1882, the German Nationalists established the slogan "Not liberal, not clerical, but national" and opposed the Jews, as well as the political and societal influence of the Roman Catholic Church.

== Starting point: Count Badeni's language decrees ==
In 1897, the Language decrees issued by Prime Minister Count Badeni were enacted. The decrees required civil servants wishing to be assigned to the Czech lands to be fully bilingual in Austrian German and Czech. The decrees were vehemently opposed by a group of Austro-German ultra-nationalists (Deutschnationale), while being largely supported by the Austrian Catholic People's Party (Katholische Volkspartei) as well as by the Czech Roman Catholic clergy. In reaction, the ultra-Nationalists promoted an oppositional movement that called for secession from Catholicism and resistance to its allegedly "alien" influence.

Schönerer's slogan (German: "Ohne Juda, ohne Rom wird gebaut Germanias Dom") ("Without either Jewry or Rome, shall Germania's cathedral be built!") demonstrates a typical conflation of anti-Catholicism with xenophobia.) In a congregation of German nationalists in Vienna, the so-called "German National Congress" (Deutscher Volkstag), the Austro-German nationalists called upon their followers to leave the Catholic Church en masse, and Schönerer coined the additional slogan (German: "Los von Rom!") ("Away from Rome!")

The conversion movement was supported by Protestant organizations from Germany, especially by the "Gustavus Adolphus Association" (Gustav-Adolf-Verein) and the Protestant Federation (Evangelischer Bund) until 1905. Between January 1898 and March 1900 10,000 Austrians defected from the Catholic Church. More than 65,000 people joining the Lutheran Church and more than 20,000 people joining the Old Catholic Church before the outbreak of World War I in 1914 were registered. As a result, many new Protestant churches and rectories had to be built. Nevertheless, not all conversions can be seen as a result of the "Away from Rome" movement. Many of them were due to a general dissatisfaction with the Roman Catholic Church, which was largely viewed as monarchist and anti-progressive. The Catholic Church was at first hesitant to react, but from 1902 onward, large press campaigns were undertaken, and administrative measures were enacted to slow down the conversion movement.

As a result, from the "Away from Rome" movement, the Protestant churches in Austria fell to an extent under the influence of Pan-German nationalists and anti-Semites. Many Austrian Protestants, however, were already influenced and affected by the Prussian-dominated German Empire and its combination of German Protestantism and German nationalism (as opposed to the religiously and culturally pluralistic policy of the Catholic Habsburg monarchy). Schönerer's influence tended to make these tendencies much stronger.

== See also ==
- Kulturkampf
