= German-National Party =

German-National Party Deutschnationale Partei
- Founded: 1907/1910
- Dissolved: 1920
- Merged into: Greater German People's Party
- Ideology: Austro–German nationalism

The German-National Party (German: Deutschnationale Partei) was a political party in Austria.

== History ==
The party contested seats in Austria in the 1907 elections in Cisleithania, receiving 0.2% of the vote. In the 1911 elections its vote share rose to 0.6%.

After World War I the party contested the 1919 Constitutional Assembly elections, in which it finished in third place with 5.8% of the national vote, winning 8 seats.
