= Wiener Medizinische Wochenschrift =

- Discipline: General medical
- Language: English

Publication details
- Publisher: Springer Science+Business Media

Standard abbreviations
- ISO 4: Wien. Med. Wochenschr.

Indexing
- ISSN: 0043-5341 (print); 1563-258X (web)

The Wiener Medizinische Wochensschrift is a medical journal published by Springer Verlag, Vienna. The Österreichische Nationalbibliothek has made old copies available over the Internet.
