= Czech Realist Party =

Czech Progressive Party Česká strana pokroková
- Leader: Václav Bouček; Přemysl Šámal; František Veselý; Otakar Krouský
- Founder: Tomáš Garrigue Masaryk
- Founded: March 31, 1900
- Dissolved: January 6, 1920
- Headquarters: Prague, Kingdom of Bohemia
- Newspaper: Čas; Česká stráž
- Youth wing: Slavie
- Ideology: Progressivism; Popular sovereignty Home rule Anticlericalism
- Political position: Centre
- Colours: Blue

The Czech Realist Party officially Czech Progressive Party founded as Czech People's Party (also known as "Realists") was founded in 1900 by Tomáš Masaryk, Karel Kramář and Josef Kaizl. It attempted to reform the Czech Government and establish a democracy in response to the Hilsner affair. Following the Hilsner affair, Masaryk became a key point of controversy and ultimately he felt that he needed to break from the Young Czechs and the Old Czechs. This led to the creation of the Czech Realist Party.

== Founding ==
Tomáš Masaryk was a key figure in the creation of the Czech Realist Party. He believed in a liberal democracy and his beliefs got him voted into the Bohemian Diet and Reichsrat (Austrian Parliament) in 1891. However, his time in politics was short lived and he resigned in 1893 after martial law was imposed in Prague when protests broke out in 1893. Although he gained support through his time in office, his role in the Hilsner Affair had a much larger effect on his role in creating the Czech Realist Party.

The Hilsner affair became a focal point of controversy in Czech history in 1899 and 1900, and this affair ultimately led to Masaryk’s creation of the Czech Realist Party. Leopold Hilsner, a Jewish vagrant, was accused of murdering Anežka Hrůzová, a Czech Catholic girl, even though there was little substantial evidence proving his guilt. Much of the nationalist press began to portray the murder as a ritual killing in order to create anti-Semitic feeling throughout the country. Masaryk believed he should defend Hilsner so that he could demonstrate his own personal beliefs. His defense led Emperor Francis Joseph to change Hilsner’s sentence from execution to lifelong imprisonment. After Masaryk led to the lessening of Hilsner’s sentence, many Czech nationalists denounced Masaryk’s choice to defend Hilsner and his belief that ethics applied to both nationalism and personal behavior. Masaryk became more critical of both the Young Czechs and the Old Czechs which led to his break from them. Masaryk collaborated with Karel Kramář and a few others in creating the Czech Realist Party which relatively soon after its creation merged with members of the Radical Progressive Party. The party became known as the Radical Progressive Party in 1905 but its members were still viewed as realists.

== Beliefs ==
The Czech Realist Party was led by Thomas Masaryk who wanted not only a free, open democracy but also a unified republic state for Czechs and Slovaks. He worked alongside Edvard Beneš to establish the goal of a unified state, and would eventually go on to be the first president of Czechoslovakia. The Realist Party wanted equality in the workplace for women, as well as universal suffrage. It sought for the legitimate establishment of democracy as a political power in Czechoslovakia. The Young Czech Party, which eventually merged with the Realist Party, was founded in 1848 and as such it was founded on nationalist ideologies, which continued through in the Realist Party. This nationalist attitude is demonstrated through the movement for a unified Czech and Slovakian state. However, Masaryk has also been accused of showing slight totalitarian leanings, as he believed that one interpretation of history and vision of the future should be imposed.
