= German nationalism in Austria =

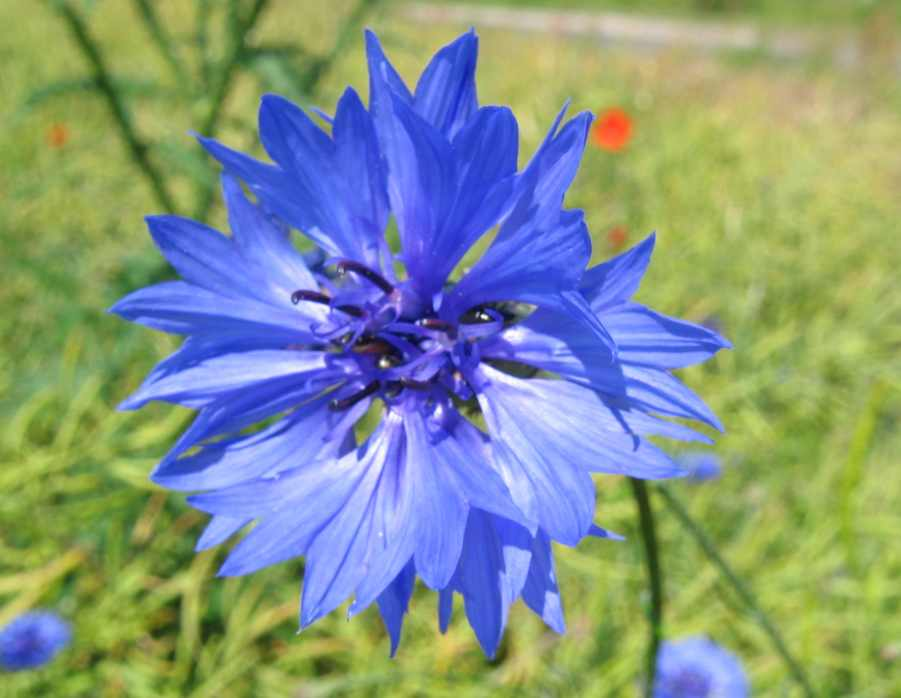
A blue cornflower, the symbol of the pan-Germanist movement in Austria

German nationalism (German: Deutschnationalismus) is a political ideology and historical current in Austrian politics. It arose in the 19th century as a nationalist movement amongst the German-speaking population of the Austro-Hungarian Empire. It favours close ties with Germany, which it views as the nation-state for all ethnic Germans, and the possibility of the incorporation of Austria into a Greater Germany.

Over the course of Austrian history, from the Austrian Empire, to Austria-Hungary, and the First and the Second Austrian Republics, several political parties and groups have expressed pan-German nationalist sentiment. National liberal and pan-Germanist parties have been termed the "Third Camp" (German: Drittes Lager) of Austrian politics, as they have traditionally been ranked behind mainstream Catholic conservatives and socialists. The Freedom Party of Austria, a far-right political party with representation in the Austrian parliament, has pan-Germanist roots. After the Second World War, both pan-Germanism and the idea of political union with Germany became unpopular due to their association with Nazism, and by the rising tide of a civic Austrian national identity.

== During the imperial period ==
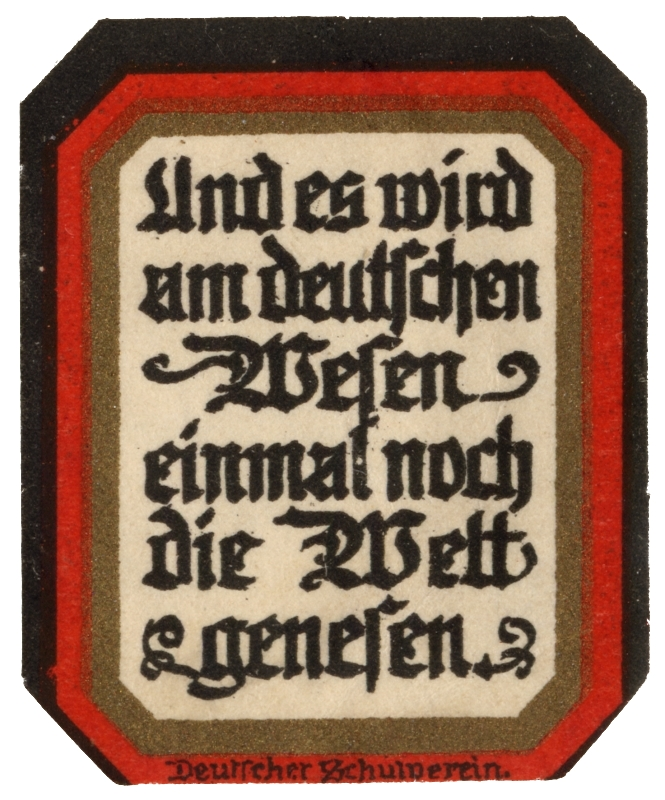
"Some time the world will be cured of its ills by the German spirit" (modified quote of a saying by Emanuel Geibel) – A pan-Germanist stamp of the German School League

Within the context of rising ethnic nationalism during the 19th century in the territories of the multi-ethnic Austrian Empire, the "German National Movement" (German: Deutschnationale Bewegung) sought the creation of a Greater Germany, along with the implementation of anti-semitic and anti-clerical policies, in an attempt to entrench the German ethnic identity. Starting with the revolutions of 1848, many ethnic groups under imperial rule, including the Serbs, Czechs, Italians, Croats, Slovenes, and Poles, amongst others, demanded political, economic, and cultural equality. Traditionally, the German-speaking population of the Empire enjoyed societal privileges dating back to the reign of Empress Maria Theresa, and that of her son, Joseph II. German was considered the lingua franca of the Empire, and Empire's elite consisted primarily of German-speakers. The struggle between the many ethnic groups of the Empire and German-speakers defined the social and political landscape of the Empire from the 1870s, after the Compromise of 1867, which granted renewed sovereignty to the Kingdom of Hungary, until the dissolution of the Empire after the First World War.

After the Austrian defeat in the Battle of Königgrätz of 1866, and the unification of what was then known as "Lesser Germany" under Prussian stewardship in 1871, the German Austrians in the Austro-Hungarian Empire felt that they had wrongly been excluded from the German nation-state, whilst other ethnicities within the Empire were tearing at its fabric. Conflict between Germans and Czechs grew particularly tense in 1879, when minister-president Viscount Taaffe did not include the German-Liberal Party (German: Deutschliberale Partei) in the government of Cisleithania. This party was considered the main representative of the German-speaking middle class, and as such, the German National Movement went on to accuse the Party of not fighting for the rights of German-speakers within the Empire. The "German School League" (German: Deutscher Schulverein) was formed in 1880 to protect German-language schools in parts of the Empire where German speakers were a minority. It promoted the establishment of German-language schools in communities where public funding was used for non-German schools.

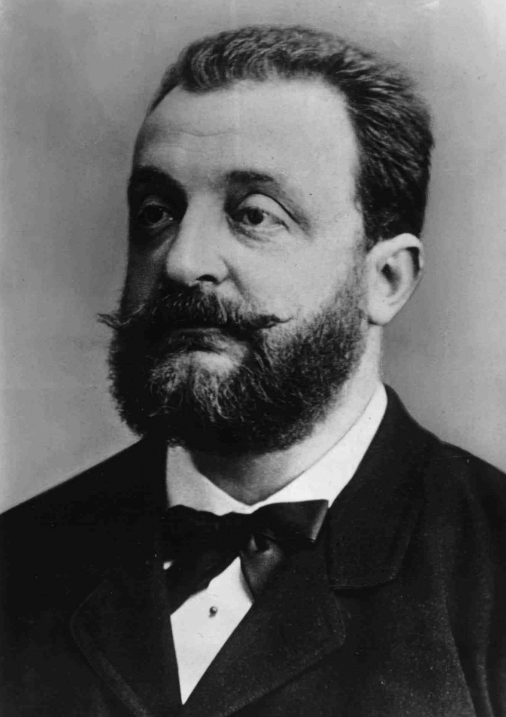
Georg von Schönerer: radical pan-Germanist, and founder of the Deutschnationaler Verein (German-National Association)

A consortium of German nationalist groups and intellectuals published the Linz Program in 1882, which demanded the recognition of German predominance in the Empire, along with the complete Germanisation of the Empire. This manifesto was signed by the radical German nationalist Georg von Schönerer, Vienna's populist, pro-Catholic, and royalist mayor Karl Lueger, and the Jewish social democrat Victor Adler. The diverse signatories of the Linz manifesto split ideologically after Schönerer revised it to add an "Aryan paragraph" in 1885.

Schönerer founded the "German-National Association" (Deutschnationaler Verein), and later, in 1891, the "Pan-German Society". He demanded the annexation of all German-speaking territories of Austria-Hungary to the Prussian-led German Empire and rejected any form of Austrian pan-ethnic identity. His radical racist German nationalism was especially popular amongst the well-educated intelligentsia: professors, grammar school teachers, and students. School administrations tried to counteract these sentiments by encouraging civic pride, along with a "cult of personality" around the Emperor, but these efforts were largely unsuccessful. Vienna mayor Karl Lueger even tried to dismiss all "Schönerians" from city school administrations, but this too failed. National-minded students rather identified with the Prussian-led German Empire than with the multiethnic Dual Monarchy. Many idolised the German chancellor Otto von Bismarck, victor in the Battle of Königgrätz.

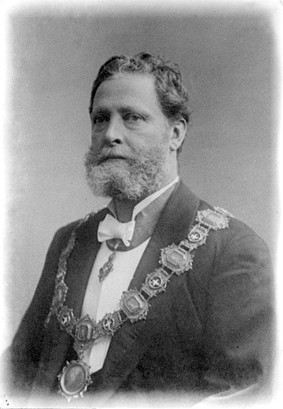
Karl Lueger, an Austrian populist who espoused antisemitic and German nationalist notions

Members of the pan-German movement wore blue cornflowers, known to be the favourite flower of German Emperor William I, in their buttonholes, along with cockades in the German national colours (black, red, and yellow). Both symbols were temporarily banned in Austrian schools. Like Schönerer, many Austrians hoped for an Anschluss with Germany. However, although many Austrians accepted the ideas of the various pan-German movements and felt part of the German nation, they accepted the existence of the Austro-Hungarian Empire, were loyal to the Habsburg dynasty, and wanted to preserve the sovereignty of Austria.

German nationalists protested vehemently against minister-president Kasimir Count Badeni's language decree of 1897, which made German and Czech co-official languages in Bohemia and required new government officials to be fluent in both languages. This meant in practice that the civil service would almost exclusively hire Czechs, because most educated Czechs knew German, but not the other way around. The support of ultramontane Catholic politicians and clergy for this reform triggered the launch of the "Away from Rome" (German: Los-von-Rom) movement, which was initiated by supporters of Schönerer and called on "German" Christians to leave the Roman Catholic Church.

From the 1880s, the pan-Germanist movement was fragmented into several splinter parties and factions. The most radical was the German Workers' Party, formed in 1903, which later transformed into the Austrian wing of the Nazi Party. Other pan-Germanist parties that contested elections during the first decade of the 20th century include the German People's Party and the German Radical Party. A broad coalition of all ethnic German national and liberal political parties known as the Deutscher Nationalverband (lit. German National Association) was formed to contest the 1911 election to the Cisleithanian Imperial Council. It went on to gain the most seats in lower house of the council, the House of Deputies (German: Abgeordnetenhaus), replacing the previously dominant Christian Social Party. Despite this victory, the German National Association was always a very loose coalition with little unity amongst its ranks, and collapsed in 1917 at the height of First World War. It disintegrated into seventeen scattered German liberal and national parties. This disintegration, combined with dissolution of Austria-Hungary at the end of the First World War, led to the total fragmentation of pan-Germanist movement.

== Dissolution of Austria-Hungary (1918–1919) ==
Areas claimed by the Republic of German Austria. These represent areas of the former Empire with majority-German populations.

After the end of the First World War, which saw the collapse of the Austro-Hungarian Empire, German-speaking parts of the former Empire established a new republic under the name "German Austria" (German: Deutsch-Österreich). The republic was proclaimed on the principle of self-determination, which had been enshrined within American president Woodrow Wilson's Fourteen Points. A provisional national assembly was convened on 11 November, at which the Republic of German Austria was proclaimed. The assembly drafted a constitution that stated that "German Austria is a democratic republic" (Article 1) and "German Austria is a component of the German Republic" (Article 2). This phrase referenced the establishment of the Weimar Republic in the former lands of the German Empire, and intended to unite German-speaking Austrians with the German nation-state, completing the Greater Germany plan. Plebiscites held in Tyrol and Salzburg yielded majorities of 98% and 99% respectively in favour of unification with Germany. However, Erich Bielka notes that the plebiscites were marred by electoral fraud and voter manipulation:

In addition to the massive propaganda campaign and not insignificant Reich German influence, ‘Ja’ ballot papers were pre-printed and provided at the polling stations and ballots were to be handed to an election official, undermining voter confidentiality. In addition, voter eligibility rules were liberally conceived and, therefore, open to abuse. Not only were those registered for the Nationalrat elections of October 1920 permitted to vote, but also those who registered themselves as living in Tyrol before April 1921, that is, less than a fortnight before going to the polls, as were all those Tyroleans who lived outside of the state; a train was even chartered from Bavaria to mitigate the financial burden of travelling ‘home’.

For Tyrol, the overriding concern was not Anschluss, but reunification with South Tyrol. The Tyrolean elites vehemently reasserted their cultural autonomy from Austria, and the policy of the Tiroler Volkspartei, the dominant party in the province following the 1919 elections, was independent Tyrol and not unification with Germany. Tyrolean politicians unequivocally rejected the Anschluss policy of the central government, contemplating every conceivable alternative, including the possibility of an independent Tyrol linked in a loose union with Switzerland or Italy, or of a fusion of the ‘western provinces’. Some conservative factions supported the idea of a union between Tyrol and Bavaria, or even the creation of a south German state. Regarding the plebiscite in Salzburg, Erich Bielka argues that Salzburg was culturally and politically unique from the rest of Austria, and its potential support for Anschluss did not reflect the general Austrian opinion at that time:

The situation was similar in Salzburg province, where democratic principles were also liberally violated. Again, the majority of the ruling elite supported Anschluss, but the circumstances surrounding the ballot make it an unreliable indicator of public sentiment, let alone pan-German attitudes. What is more, Salzburg can in no way be considered paradigmatic for the rest of Austria. Salzburg, which had been independent until the early nineteenth century, had spent the shortest time under Habsburg rule; when it finally fell to Austria in 1816, part of the province, the Rupertiwinkel, had remained with Bavaria, which had ruled Salzburg during the Napoleonic years. Therefore, for Salzburg, union with Bavaria was an entirely logical step that might actually restore the provinces historic borders.

The victors of the First World War who drafted the Treaty of Versailles and the Saint-Germain-en-Laye strictly forbade any attempt by German Austria to unify with Germany. They also gave some lands that had been claimed by German Austria to newly formed nation-states. An example of this was the giving of the provinces of German Bohemia and the Sudetenland to the Czecho-Slovak Republic. These lands, having German-speaking majorities, were prevented from being within their own nation-state. Instead, they were trapped in the nation-states of other ethnicities. This grievance would play a fundamental part in the rise of pan-Germanism during the Interwar period. Karl Renner, a member of the Social Democratic Workers' Party, served as chancellor of German Austria. Renner himself was a proponent of the idea of "Greater Germany", and penned the unofficial anthem Deutschösterreich, du herrliches Land ("German Austria, you wonderful country"). Renner was born in southern Moravia, which was one of the lands claimed by German Austria, but instead given to the Czecho-Slovak Republic. Despite his background, however, he signed the Treaty of Saint-Germain on 10 September 1919, which established the Allied-drawn borders of the new Austrian republic, and formally forbid any attempt to unify the German-speaking lands of the former Austria-Hungary with Germany. The name "German Austria" was changed to "Austria", removing any hint of pan-Germanist sentiment from the name of the state. Nevertheless, the Social Democrats would not forget their pan-Germanist roots. To them, the Weimar Republic was regarded with "exaggerated sympathy", whilst the Czecho-Slovak Republic was viewed with "exaggerated suspicion".

== During the First Republic and Austrofascist period (1919–1938) ==
During the First Austrian Republic, pan-Germanists were represented by the Greater German People's Party and the agrarian Landbund. Although initially influential, these two groups soon lost most of their voters to the Christian Social Party and the Social Democratic Party. Both the Christian Socials and the Social Democrats accepted that unification between Austria and Germany was forbidden by the Treaty of Saint-Germain. A conflict would develop, however, between those who supported an Austrian national identity, such as the Christian Socials, and those rooted in German nationalism, such as the Social Democrats.

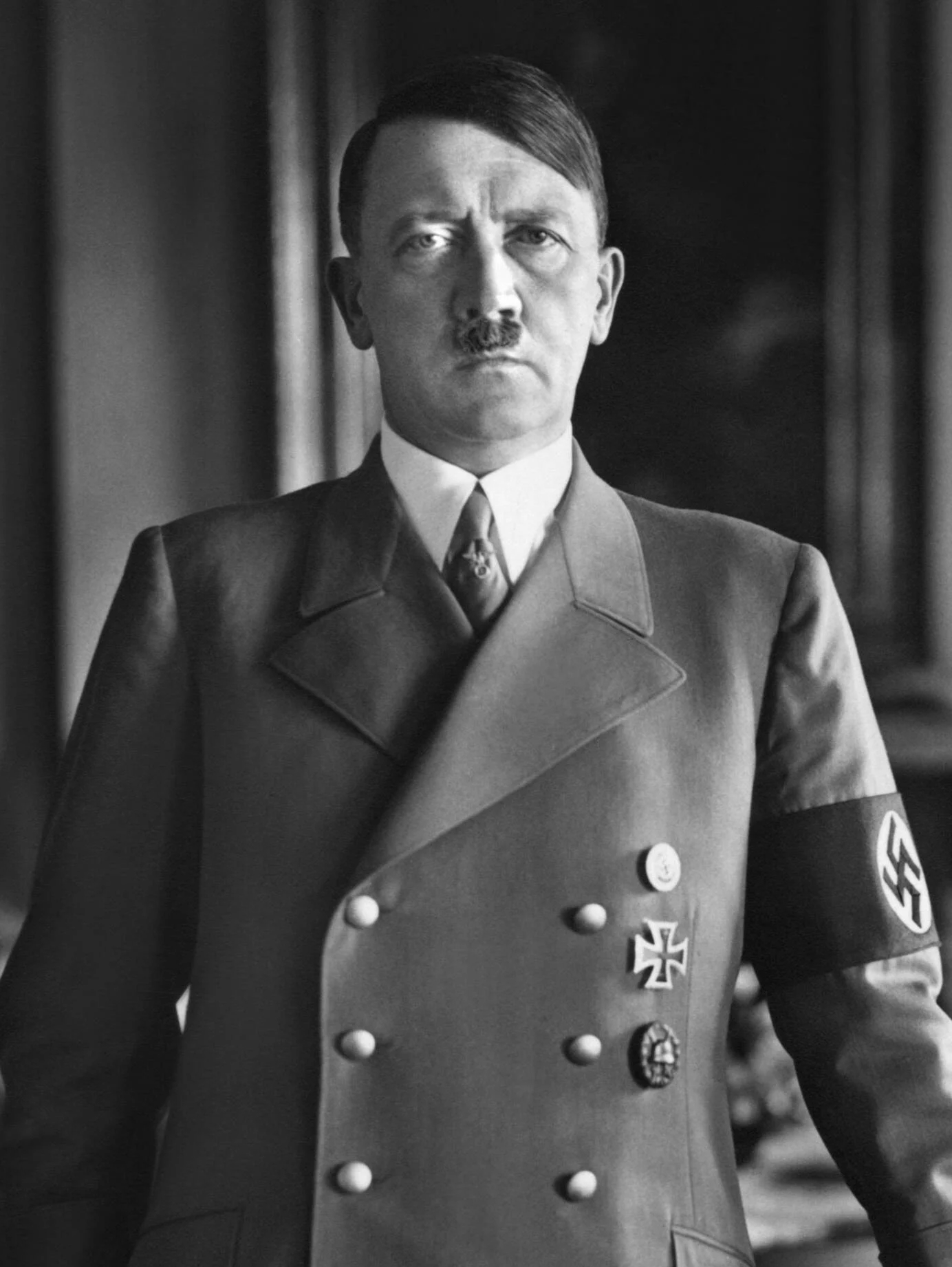
Adolf Hitler, dictator of Nazi Germany, was born in Austria and propagated radical German nationalist views.

Plebiscites in Tyrol and Salzburg in 1921, saw majorities of 98.77% and 99.11% voted for a unification with Germany.

One of the foundational problems of the First Republic was that those who had supported the concept of a democratic republic from the German Austria period onward, such as the Social Democrats, did not consider themselves "Austrian", but instead were German nationalists. Those who supported an Austrian national identity, an Austria without the word "German" attached, were conservative and largely undemocratic in persuasion: former Imperial bureaucrats, army officers, priests, aristocrats, and affiliated with the Christian Social Party. In the words of historian A. J. P. Taylor, "The democrats were not 'Austrian'; the 'Austrians' were not democrats." These two groups, the German nationalist democrats, and the Austrian nationalist conservatives, would squabble throughout the first decade of the First Republic. Ultimately, the Austrian nationalist faction would overthrow the democratic republic in 1934 and establish a regime rooted in "Austrofascism" under the protection of Fascist Italy.

One of the exceptions to this, however, was the Communist Party of Austria. The KPÖ supported independent Austria and a separate identity from Germany, with leading communist intellectual Alfred Klahr writing that the view that the Austrian people were a part of Germany was theoretically unfounded. The fact that the socialists took a different view from those of Karl Renner's wing of the Social Democrat Party was one of the factors behind the collapse of the left-wing coalition, leading all successive governments to be dominated by the anti-Anschluss Christian Social Party under Ignaz Seipel instead. As the economic situation of Austria improved, the sentiment for Anschluss soon declined. According to Stefan Zweig, Seipel was staunchly against unification with Germany:

Seipel stood in deep rooted opposition to German, Prussian Protestant militarism as incompatible with the traditional ideas of Austria and her Catholic mission. Anschluss would invariably mean becoming a province among provinces under the leadership of Prussia. To Seipel, this westernized concept of a nation state was not only unsuited for the German context, it could not be the ultimate incarnation of German nationhood, precisely because Austria had undergone a different historical experience.

While most of right-wing Heimwehren paramilitary groups active during the First Republic were rooted in Austrian nationalism, and either affiliated with the conservative Christian Socials, or inspired by Italian Fascism, there was also a German nationalist faction. This faction was most notable within the Styrian Heimatschutz ("homeland protection"). Its leader, Walter Pfrimer, attempted a putsch against a Christian Social government in September 1931. The putsch was directly modelled on the Benito Mussolini's March on Rome, but failed almost instantly due to lack of support from other Heimwehr groups. Pfrimer subsequently founded the "German Heimatschutz", which would later merge into the Nazi Party.

The idea of an Anschluss (union between Austria and Germany to form a Greater Germany), was one of the principal ideas of the Austrian branch of the National Socialist (Nazi) Party. Nazism can be seen as descended from the radical branches of the pan-Germanist movement. In 1933, the Nazis and the Greater German People's Party formed a joint working-group, and eventually merged. During the period while the Nazi Party and its symbols were banned in Austria, from 1933 to 1938, Austrian Nazis resumed the earlier pan-Germanist tradition of wearing a blue cornflower in their buttonhole.

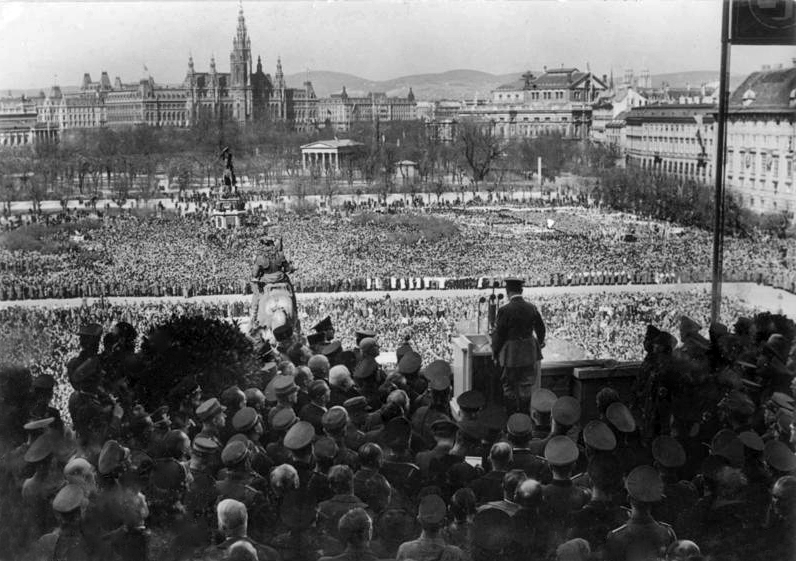
Hitler announces the Anschluss to roughly 200,000 German Austrians on the Heldenplatz, Vienna, 15 March 1938.

The Nazis firmly fought the Austrofascist regime of chancellor Engelbert Dollfuss, and orchestrated his assassination. They continued this battle against his successor, Kurt Schuschnigg. Austrofascism was strongly supported by Benito Mussolini, leader of Fascist Italy. Mussolini's support for an independent Austria can be seen in a discussion he had with Prince Ernst Rüdiger Starhemberg, an important Austrian nationalist and Heimwehr leader. He said that "an Anschluss with Germany must never be permitted ... Austria is necessary to the maintenance of Europe ... the day that Austria falls and is swallowed up by Germany will mark the beginning of European chaos." The Austrofascist party, Fatherland Front, would echo the sentiments of Mussolini, and continue to struggle for an independent Austria. Nazis in both Germany and Austria intended that the German Reich would quickly annex Austria, the homeland of its leader, Adolf Hitler. They attempted to bribe many low-ranking Heimwehr leaders, and also attempted to bring Starhemberg into their fold, in effect merging the Heimwehr with the Nazi Freikorps. Gregor Strasser, an early, prominent Nazi figure, was charged with this effort. When Starhemberg, a fervent believer in an independent Austria, rejected his merger proposal, Strasser said "Don't talk to me about Austria. There is no Austria ... there was once a living corpse which called itself Austria ... that this Austria collapsed in 1918 was a blessing ... particularly for the German people, who were thereby given the chance to create a Greater Germany."

In February 1934, the government's search for weapons belonging to the Republican Protection League, the banned paramilitary arm of the Social Democrats, led to the outbreak of the brief Austrian Civil War. Even before the victory of the Austrofascist government, the Social Democratic Party was outlawed entirely. A few months later, the worsening tensions between the Nazis and Austrofascists culminated in the July Putsch of 1934, when Nazis attempted to overthrow the government. Whilst they managed to assassinate chancellor Engelbert Dollfuss, the putsch was quickly crushed by the police, army, and Heimwehren. This, in tandem with a continued a campaign of violence and propaganda by the Nazis, destabilised the Austrofascist regime, and rallied many to support the idea of Anschluss.

The Nazi campaign was ultimately successful, and Hitler would go on to annex Austria in 1938 with the Anschluss. Hitler's journey through his home country Austria became a triumphal tour that reached its climax in Vienna on 15 March 1938, when around 200,000 cheering German Austrians gathered around the Heldenplatz (Square of Heroes) to hear Hitler say that "The oldest eastern province of the German people shall be, from this point on, the newest bastion of the German Reich" followed by his "greatest accomplishment" (completing the annexing of Austria to form a Greater German Reich) by saying: "As leader and chancellor of the German nation and Reich I announce to German history now the entry of my homeland into the German Reich." After the Anschluss, Hitler remarked as a personal note: "I, myself, as Führer and Chancellor, will be happy to walk on the soil of the country that is my home as a free German citizen." However, in case of a fair plebiscite, the Anschluss would have been supported only by 20 % of the Austrian population. According to the estimates of the Austrian government, with the voting age of 24, about 70 % of Austrians would have voted to preserve the Austrian independence, while only 25 % were supportive of the NSDAP.

Hitler responded to the foreign press regarding the Anschluss by saying: "Certain foreign newspapers have said that we fell on Austria with brutal methods. I can only say: even in death they cannot stop lying. I have in the course of my political struggle won much love from my people, but when I crossed the former frontier (into Austria) there met me such a stream of love as I have never experienced. Not as tyrants have we come, but as liberators."

Following the Anschluss, the historical aim of the German nationalists who supported the union between Austria and Germany was completed. The pan-Germanists were then fully absorbed into the Nazi Party (NSDAP).

== During the Second Republic (since 1945) ==
After the end of the Second World War, when Austria was re-established as an independent state, the German nationalist movement was discredited because of its links to the former Nazi regime. The dominant parties of the new republic were the Christian conservative Austrian People's Party (ÖVP) and the Social Democratic Party of Austria (SPÖ). Both promoted Austrian independence, and considered the idea of a "Greater Germany" an anachronism. All former members of the Nazi party were banned from any political activity, and disenfranchised. The pan-Germanist and liberal "Third Camp" was later revived in the form of the Federation of Independents (German: Verband der Unabhängigen, VdU), which fought de-Nazification laws imposed by the Allies, and represented the interests of former Nazis, Wehrmacht, and SS soldiers. In 1956, the Federation was transformed into the Freedom Party of Austria (FPÖ). In the 1950s and 1960s, the German nationalist movement, represented by the Freedom Party and its affiliated organisations, was very active in universities, where the Burschenschaften, a type of student fraternity, helped spread German nationalist and liberal views. Inside the Freedom Party, the liberal wing grew to overtake the pan-Germanist wing, and Austrian patriotism was gradually incorporated into the party's ideology. During Norbert Steger's party leadership during 1980–1986, and the Freedom Party's participation in a coalition government with the Social Democrats, the pan-Germanist faction was weakened further.

By contrast, Jörg Haider's assumption of party leadership in 1986 was considered a triumph by the German nationalist faction. However, Haider's right-wing populism did not stress pan-Germanist traditions, as doing so would have cost votes. In 1987, only six per cent of Austrian citizens identified themselves as "Germans". While Haider had branded Austrian national identity as an ideological construct, going so far to refer to it as a "monstrosity" (German: Mißgeburt) in 1988, he launched the "Austria First" petition in 1993, and claimed two years later that the Freedom Party was a "classical Austrian patriotic party", expressly renouncing his earlier "monstrosity" statement. The influence of German nationalism was still present, however, and could be seen in hostile actions against Slavic minorities in Austria, such as in conflicts over bilingual road signs with the Carinthian Slovenes, along with hostility to immigration and European integration. Traditional Greater German ideas have therefore been replaced by a German-Austrian concept (i.e. only considering Austrians of German origin and tongue as "real" Austrians). This may be summarised as an "amalgamation of traditional German nationalism with Austrian patriotism".

Presently, the pan-Germanist wing is only a minor faction within the Freedom Party. In 2008, fewer than seventeen per cent of the Freedom Party's voters questioned the existence of a unique Austrian national identity. German nationalists, including Andreas Mölzer and Martin Graf, now refer to themselves as "cultural Germans" (Kulturdeutsche), and stress the importance of their identity as ethnic Germans, in contrast to the distinct Austrian national identity. In 2006, FPÖ members of parliament reaffirmed the party's root in the pan-Germanist tradition, at least symbolically, by wearing blue cornflowers in their buttonholes, along with ribbons in Austria's national colours (red and white), during the initial meeting of the National Council. This caused controversy, as the media interpreted the flower as a former Nazi symbol.

The Austrian National Democratic Party (NDP) ran in the 1970 legislative election, receiving 2,631 (0.1%) of the votes cast. It advocated the Anschluss of Austria into Germany. The (NDP) leader Norbert Burger ran in the 1980 presidential election "for a German Austria", gaining 140,741 votes (3.2%). The party would be banned by 1988.

== See also ==
- Austria-Germany relations
