= German People's Party (Austria) =

German People's Party Deutsche Volkspartei
- Leader: Otto Steinwender
- Founded: June 1896
- Dissolved: 1920
- Split from: German National Party
- Succeeded by: Greater German People's Party (Austria); German National Party (Czechoslovakia)
- Ideology: Austro–German nationalism
- National affiliation: Deutscher Nationalverband

The German People's Party (German: Deutsche Volkspartei) was a political party of the German-speaking group in the Cisleithanian part of the Austro-Hungarian Empire. It was founded in 1896 as a successor to the German National Party and was led by Otto Steinwender.

== History ==
In the 1907 elections the party contested seats within the Austrian part of Cisleithania, receiving 2.8% of the Austrian vote. Its vote share fell to 1.6% in the 1911 elections.

After World War I the party contested the 1919 Constitutional Assembly elections, in which it received 2% of the national vote and won two seats. The following year the party merged into the Greater German People's Party.
