= Imperial Council (Austria) =

Legislature of the Austrian Empire from 1861

Imperial Council Reichsrat
- Lesser coat of arms of Cisleithania (1915–1918)

Type
- Type: Bicameral
- Houses: House of Lords; House of Deputies

History
- Founded: 26 February 1861
- Disbanded: 12 November 1918
- Preceded by: Imperial Diet
- Succeeded by: Provisional National Assembly

Leadership
- President of the House of Lords: Alfred III (last)
- President of the House of Deputies: Gustav Groß (last)

Elections
- Last election: 1911

Meeting place
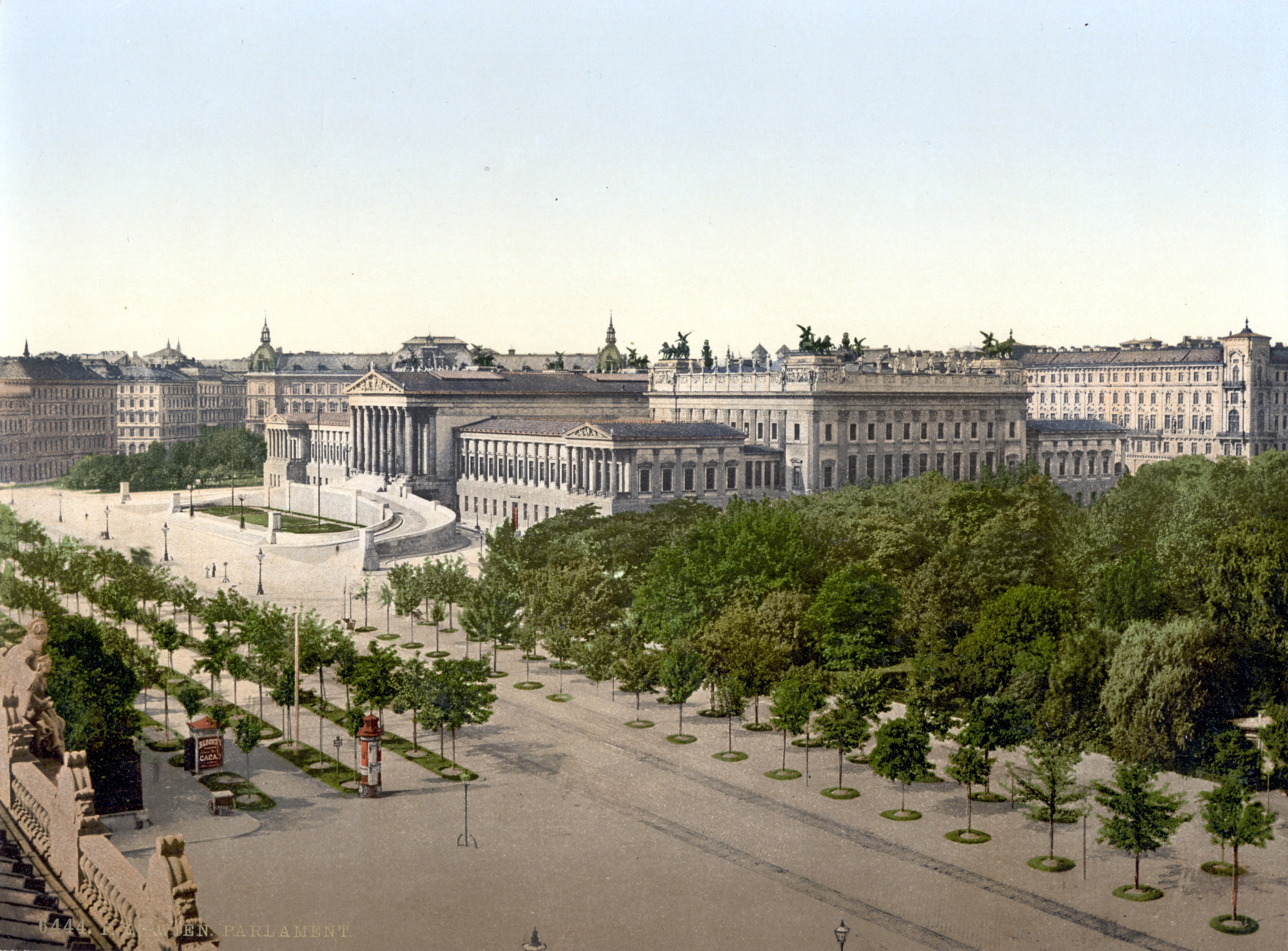
- Parliament Building; Vienna

The Imperial Council (Note: German: Reichsrat; Czech: Říšská rada; Polish: Rada Państwa; Italian: Consiglio Imperiale; Slovene: Državni zbor; Ukrainian: Райхсрат, Державна рада; Bosnian: Carevinsko vijeće; Romanian: Consiliul Imperial) was the legislature of the Austrian Empire from 1861 (Note: From 1867 the legislature of Cisleithania within Austria-Hungary.) until 1918. It was a bicameral body: the upper house was the House of Lords (German: Herrenhaus), and the lower house was the House of Deputies (German: Abgeordnetenhaus). To become law, bills had to be passed by both houses, signed by the government minister responsible, and then granted royal assent by the Emperor. After having been passed, laws were published in the Reichsgesetzblatt (lit. Reich Law Gazette). In addition to the Imperial Council, the fifteen individual crown lands of Cisleithania had their own diets (German: Landtage).

The seat of the Imperial Council from 4 December 1883 was in the Parliament Building on Ringstraße in Vienna. Prior to the completion of this building, the House of Lords met in the Estates House of Lower Austria, and the House of Deputies met in a temporary wooden building designed by Ferdinand Fellner on Währinger Straße. The Imperial Council was dissolved on 12 November 1918, following Austria-Hungary's defeat in the First World War.

== Establishment ==
In the course of the Revolutions of 1848, representatives from those crown lands of the Austrian Empire incorporated in the German Confederation met in an "Imperial Diet" at Vienna. The convention was inaugurated by Archduke John on 22 July 1848 and after the Vienna Uprising of October moved to Kroměříž (German: Kremsier) in Moravia. It not only abolished the last remnants of serfdom in the Austrian lands, but also undertook to draw up a constitution that would reflect the Empire's character of a multinational state, especially in view of the Austroslavic movement led by the Czech politician František Palacký.

On 4 March 1849, however, minister-president Felix zu Schwarzenberg took the initiative and imposed the March Constitution, which promised the equality of all Austrian people and also provided for a bicameral "Imperial Diet". It was nevertheless only a sidestep, as Schwarzenberg three days later forcefully disbanded the Kremsier Parliament and finally had the constitution annulled with the New Year's Eve Patent (Silvesterpatent) of 1851. Emperor Franz Joseph went on to rule with absolute power. In place of the Imperial Diet, he installed an "Imperial Council" (German: Reichsrat), whose members were appointed on his authority.

In the 1850s, chronic fiscal malaise became acute. The dire nature of the situation was revealed to the Emperor after the Second Italian War of Independence and the bloody defeat of Austrian forces at the 1859 Battle of Solferino. To calm the domestic front and to gain the support of wealthy Bourgeoisie, Franz Joseph issued the October Diploma in 1860. An "Imperial Diet", still meant as a conciliatory body, was supposed to have 100 delegates elected by provincial diets that were to be established for each Austrian crown land. This electoral system, however, satisfied neither the bourgeois liberals nor the Hungarian nobility, who refused to accept any authority higher than the Hungarian Diet.

For this reason, the Diploma was discarded and replaced by the February Patent of 1861, which was drafted by liberal minister-president Anton von Schmerling. This established a bicameral Imperial Council: the upper house was the House of Lords (German: Herrenhaus), and the lower house was the House of Deputies (German: Abgeordnetenhaus).

== House of Lords ==
The House of Lords was convened for the first time on 29 April 1861. It was similar in form to the present day House of Lords of the United Kingdom. It met in the Palais Niederösterreich in Vienna until the Parliament Building was completed in 1883. The House of Lords was composed of:

- Archdukes of the Imperial House
- Lords spiritual – influential Catholic archbishops and bishops of various cities, some in the Latin Church and others in one of the Eastern Catholic Churches
- Hereditary peers – selected from certain families among the hereditary landowning nobility
- Life peers – citizens of Austria appointed to the House for life by the Emperor, for services to the state, the church, science, or art

The last meeting of the House of Lords was held on 30 October 1918. The meeting was adjourned within five minutes. The House of Lords chamber of the Parliament Building was destroyed by bombing during the Second World War. It was rebuilt in a contemporary style, and serves as the chamber of the now democratically elected National Council of the Republic of Austria.

== House of Deputies ==
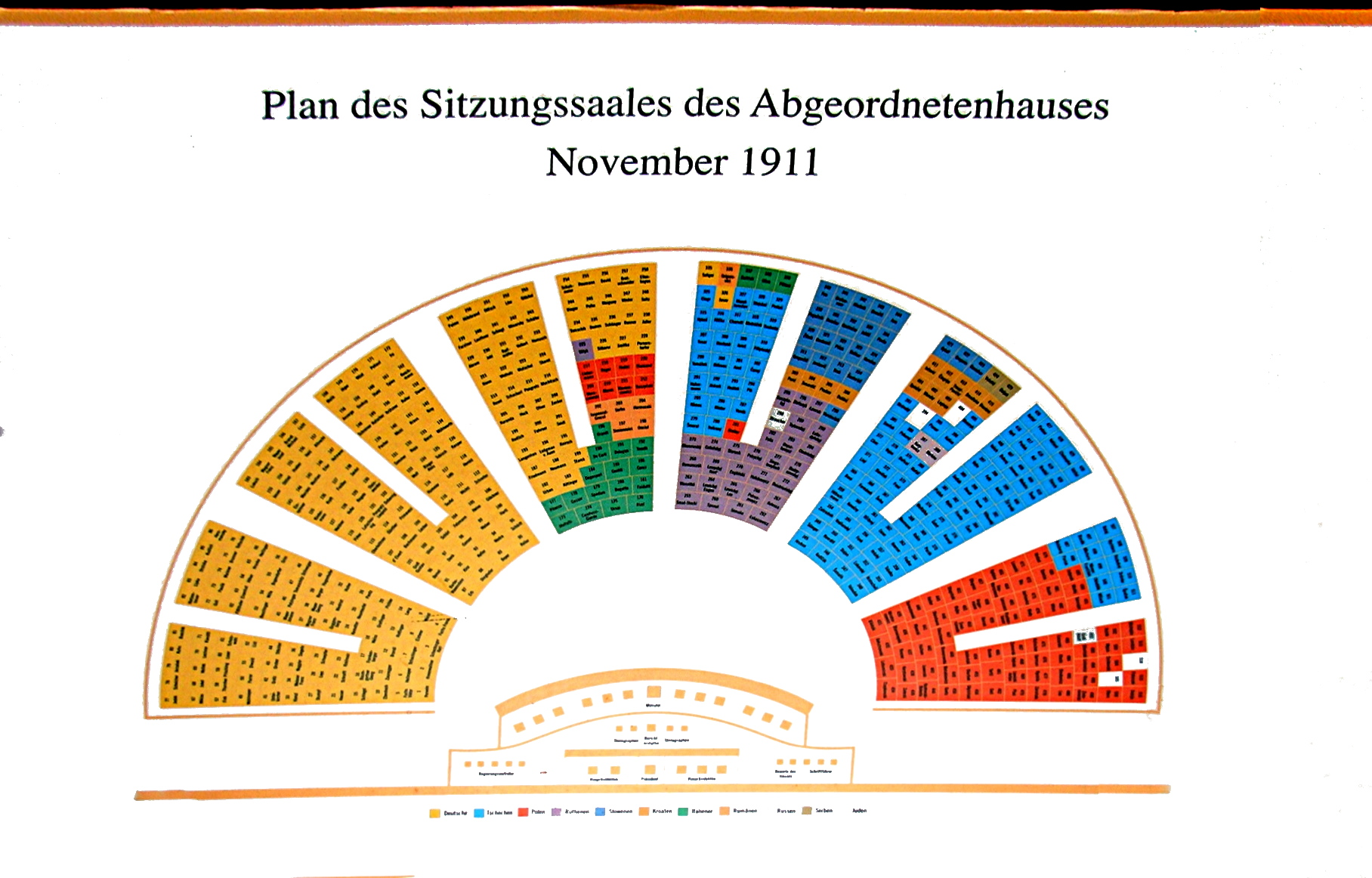
Seats of the House of Deputies of the Imperial Austro-Hungarian Council. Situation after the November 1911 Cisleithanian legislative elections. The seats are marked by nationality.

Upon establishment of the Imperial Council by the February Patent, elections to the House of Deputies were conducted through a system of "curiae". In this system, there were 343 deputies elected by the diets of the crown lands. The diets themselves were elected by four curiae. The curiae were essentially assemblies of certain social classes. There was one curia for the landowning class, one curia for the chambers of commerce, one curia for the towns and cities, and one curia for rural communities. Each curia would elect a select number of deputies to the diets, which would in turn elect deputies to the Imperial Council. To be part of the curia of the cities and the curia of the rural communities, a man had to pay at least ten guilders in tax. This system was rejected by Hungary, as with the October Diploma, and Hungary never sent any delegates to the Council. The February Patent was suspended in 1865.

With the Austro-Hungarian Compromise of 1867, Hungary would no longer send deputies to the Imperial Council. Instead, the Empire was reorganised into two equal parts: Cisleithania and Transleithania. Cisleithania consisted of the Austrian part of the Empire, officially "The Kingdoms and Lands Represented in the Imperial Council". Transleithania consisted of the Kingdom of Hungary and its subordinate, the Kingdom of Croatia-Slavonia. Instead of a subordinate regional diet, Hungary was granted its own parliament, and essentially attained the status of "sovereign state". The curia system, however, remained in place. At this point, the Council had extensive legislative powers in all Cisleithanian matters. Appointment and dismissal of the government of the Cisleithania and the Minister-President remained the right of the emperor. The number of deputies each diet sent to the Imperial Council was set by the Compromise. There were 203 deputies in total:

- 54 from the Kingdom of Bohemia
- 5 from the Kingdom of Dalmatia
- 38 from the Kingdom of Galicia and Lodomeria,
- 18 from the Archduchy of Lower Austria
- 10 from the Archduchy of Upper Austria
- 3 from the Duchy of Salzburg
- 13 from the Duchy of Styria
- 5 from the Duchy of Carinthia
- 6 from the Duchy of Carniola
- 5 from the Duchy of Bukovina
- 22 from the Margraviate of Moravia
- 6 from the Duchy of Upper and Lower Silesia
- 10 from the Princely County of Tyrol
- 2 from Vorarlberg
- 2 from the Margraviate of Istria
- 2 from the Princely County of Gorizia and Gradisca
- 2 from Imperial Free City of Trieste

The next great change to the Imperial Council came in 1873. The number of deputies was increased from 203 to 353. Deputies would no longer be elected by the diets of the crown lands. Instead, they would be directly elected through the curia system for six year terms. The curia of the landowners elected 85 deputies, that of the chambers of commerce 21, that of cities 118, and that of the rural communities 128. Overall, only 6% of the population of the Empire could vote in these elections. Tax requirements for entry into the curiae remained the same, but was lowered to five guilders in 1883.

On October 10, 1893, minister-president Eduard Taaffe, 11th Viscount Taaffe submitted a bill in the House of Deputies that intended to abolish the fourth curia, and introduce universal suffrage in the third curia for those men below the five guilder threshold. This was fervently opposed, and was not passed into law. Despite this, the number of deputies was increased to 425 on 14 June 1896 through reforms by minister-president Count Kasimir Felix Badeni. A fifth curia was added, which granted universal suffrage to all men over the age of 24. This curia elected 72 deputies, shifting the balance of power away from the nobility.

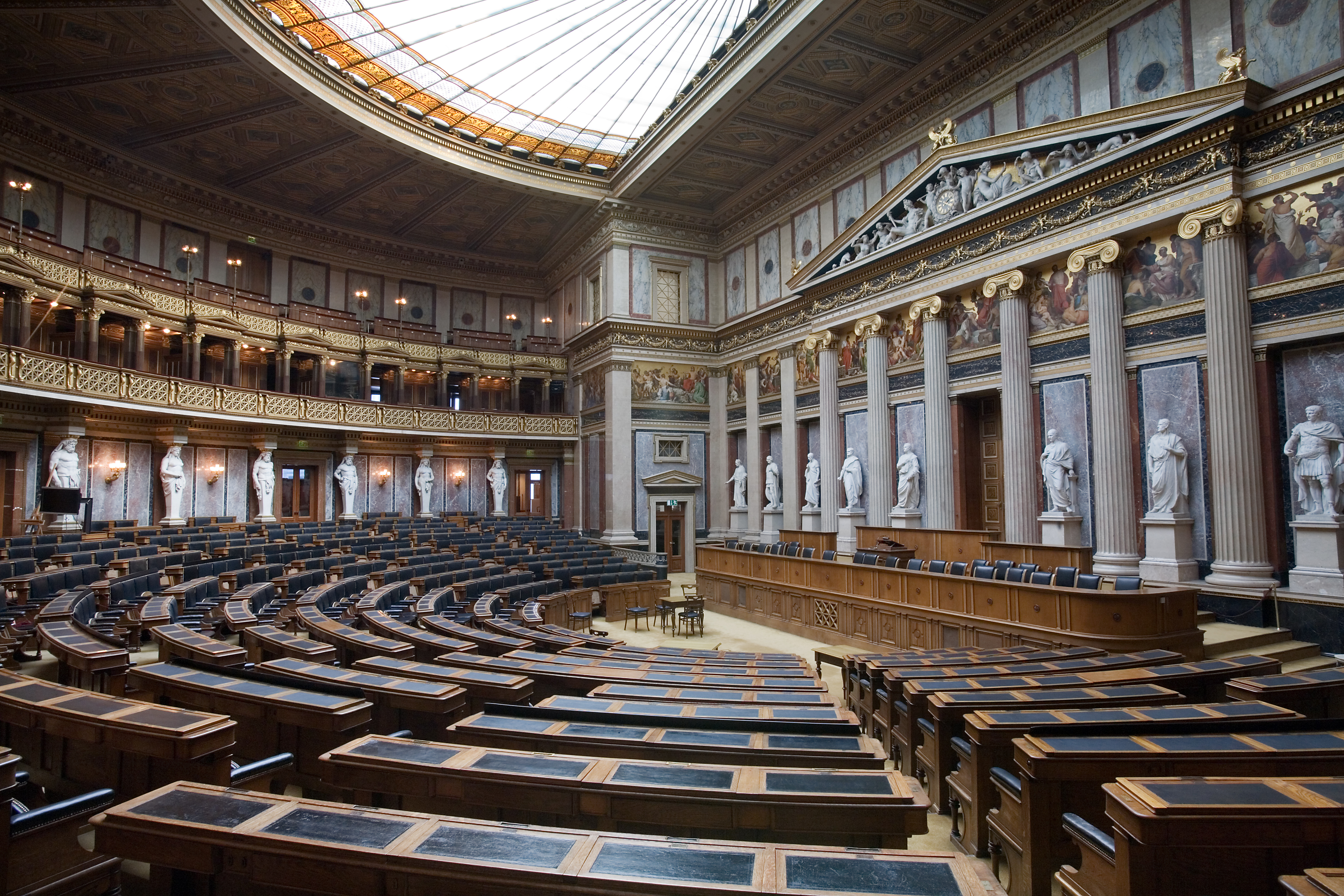
Debating chamber of the House of Deputies

Minister-president Paul Gautsch von Frankenthurn introduced the final electoral reform in the history of the House of Deputies in 1906, after mass demonstrations by the rising Social Democratic Party, and despite fierce opposition in the House of Lords. Universal suffrage for men was introduced, and the curia system was abolished. The number of deputies was raised to 516, and seats were allotted once again based on the crown lands.

Universal suffrage allowed greater representation for members of the working class, and diminished the power of the German-speaking bourgeoisie. Whilst this was an advance for democracy, it resulted in the splintering of the House of Deputies into numerous factions based on nationality and ideology, which made it dysfunctional. Throughout its existence, the effectiveness of the Imperial Council suffered heavily from conflicts between and within the numerous constituent nationalities of the Empire. Governments of Cisleithania had to rely on loose ad hoc alliances, often with the support of the Polish representatives (Polenklub), and there were as many as 29 Minister-Presidents between 1867 and 1918.

== Dissolution ==
From the July Crisis in 1914, the Imperial Council was suspended. It remained so for the duration of the First World War, until it was finally reconvened in May 1917. It was permanently dissolved on 12 November 1918, the day after the de facto abdication of Emperor Charles.

== See also ==
- Diet of Hungary
- Imperial Diet (Austria)
- Moravian Diet
- Parliament of Croatia

== Footnotes ==
=== General references ===
- Hamman, Brigitte (1999). Hitler's Vienna: A Dictator's Apprenticeship. New York: Oxford University Press. ISBN 0-19-512537-1.
- Mommsen, Hans (2003). The Third Reich Between Vision and Reality: New Perspectives on German History 1918-1945. Berg Publishers. ISBN 1-85973-627-0.
