= Františka Stránecká =

Czech writer and collector of Moravian folklore

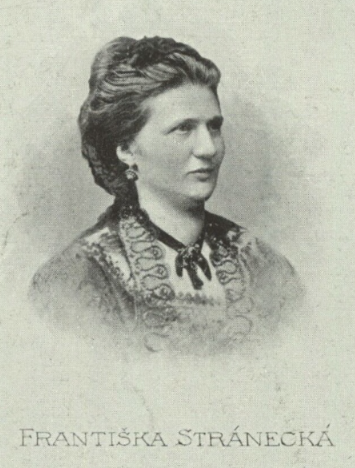
- Born: Františka Antonie Kajetána Všetečková; 9 March 1839; Velké Meziříčí, Moravia, Austrian Empire
- Died: 27 May 1888 (aged 49); Brno, Moravia, Austria-Hungary
- Occupations: writer, folklore collector

Františka Antonie Kajetána Kerschnerová, better known as Františka Stránecká (9 March 1839 – 27 May 1888), was a Czech writer and collector of Moravian folklore.

== Life ==
Františka Stránecká née Všetečková, was born on 9 March 1839 in Velké Meziříčí, in the family of the local burgrave František Všetečka. She grew up in Stránecká Zhoř, and used the name of the village in her pseudonym "Stránecká" later in life. At sixteen, she married Ignác Kerschner. The couple spent their first five years in Berehove, then they moved to Uherské Hradiště. In 1874, the couple settled in Brno. Stránecká lived there until her death on 27 May 1888.

== Career ==
Stránecká started writing after the death of her father and brother, as a way of coping with the situation. She wrote under the pseudonym Františka Stránecká and debuted in 1868 with a collection of fairy tales titled Pohádky z Moravy, published thanks to Karel Jaromír Erben, who recommended them to the publisher Eduard Grégr. She kept her real identity secret; it was uncovered in 1882, in a lecture on Czech and Moravian writers by Jan Herben.

Stránecká collected fairy tales and folklore of Moravia and Moravian Slovakia and wrote about the local traditions and history, including drawing patterns of embroidery, writing down recipes, songs, sayings and children's games. She also wrote down detailed descriptions of traditional costumes. She retold local tales and wrote short stories about the life of the local villagers. Her works were published in newspapers and magazines, such as Ženské listy, Světozor, Zlatá Praha, Zora, Beseda, Časopis Matice moravské, Květy, as well as published as stand-alone books.

Stránecká was called a "Moravian Božena Němcová".

== Published works ==
- Pohádky z Moravy (1868)
- Z našich hor (1877)
- Z našeho lidu (1882)
- Některé črty (1885)
- Z pohoří moravského (1886)
