= Karel Sladkovský =

Czech journalist, writer and politician (1823–1880)

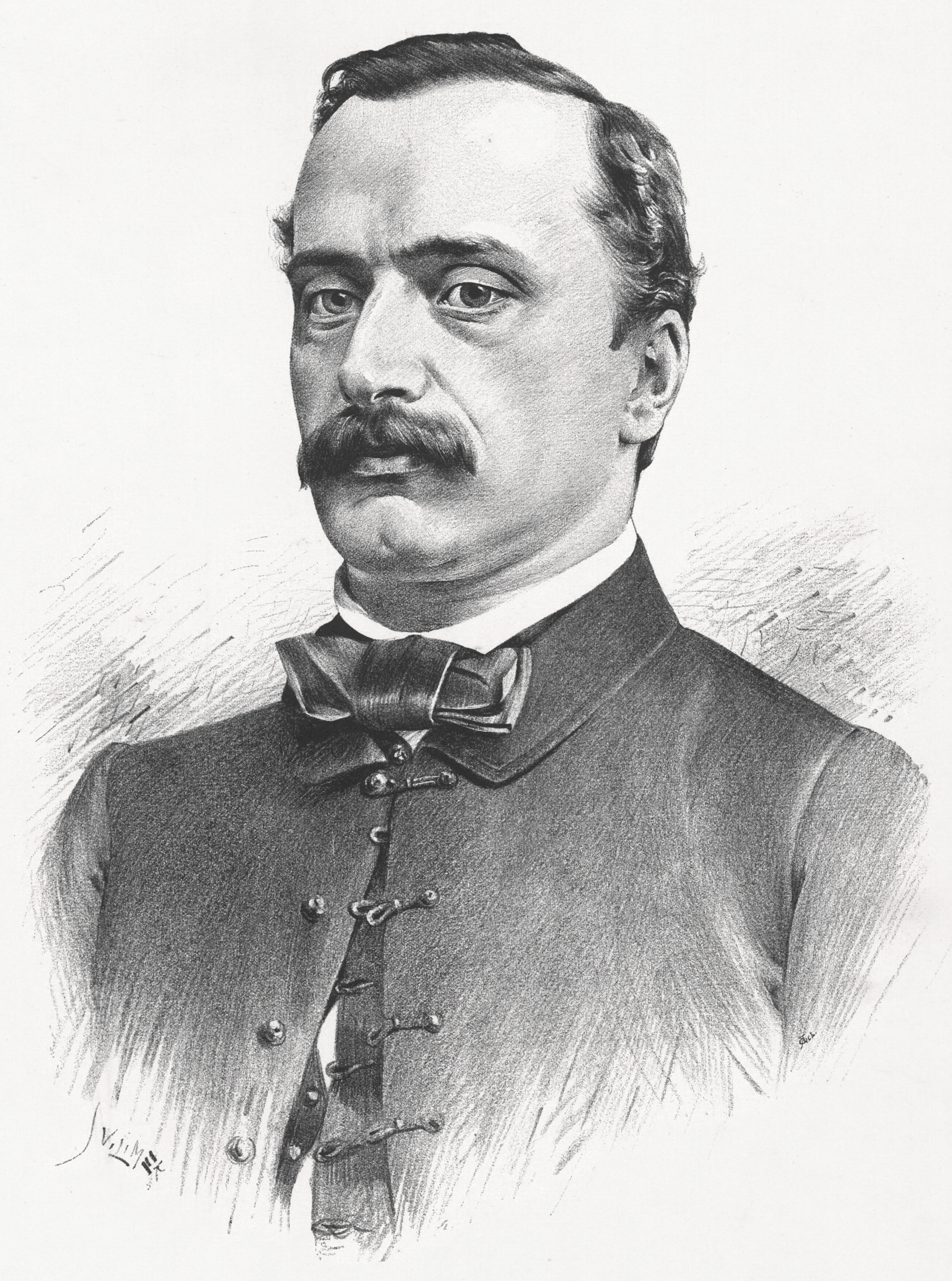
- Karel Sladkovský by Jan Vilímek in c. 1875

Personal details
- Born: 22 June 1823 Prague-Malá Strana, Bohemia, Austrian Empire
- Died: 4 March 1880 (aged 56) Prague, Bohemia, Austria-Hungary
- Education: Gymnasium in Malá Strana
- Occupation: Writer, journalist

Karel Sladkovský (22 June 1823 – 4 March 1880) was a Czech lawyer, politician and journalist.

== Early life and education ==
Born the son of a tailor in Malá Strana in Prague, Sladkovský studied gymnasium of Malá Strana and later finished studies of law at the University of Vienna. He was presented at Prague Slavic Congress and later took part in the June revolution of 1848 as a Prague student leader during the fights on the barricades. He was arrested and also accused of involvement in the May Conspiracy. Initially sentenced to death in 1850, he was later pardoned and given 20 years in prison. Finally he was released in 1857 due to a general amnesty. In 1861, he received official rehabilitation.

From 1860 he worked as an editor at the newspapers Čas, Hlas and Národní listy. He later became one of the most prominent figures in Czech public life during the era of late Czech National Revival: with interruptions he served as a member of the Bohemian Diet from 1862 to 1880, also was a leading spokesman of the Czech national movement and keynote speaker at the laying of the foundation stone of the National Theatre. Sladkovský was member of a National Party (Old Czech Party) and later a co-founder of the Young Czech Party in 1874.

He and František Ladislav Rieger negotiated with the government about the return of Czech deputies to the Reichsrat. In 1879 Sladkovský was elected for the mandate again, but was unable to assume office due to ill health.

Karel Sladkovský died on 4 March 1880, aged 56. He was buried at Olšany Cemetery to the tomb created by sculptor Josef Václav Myslbek.

== Memorials ==
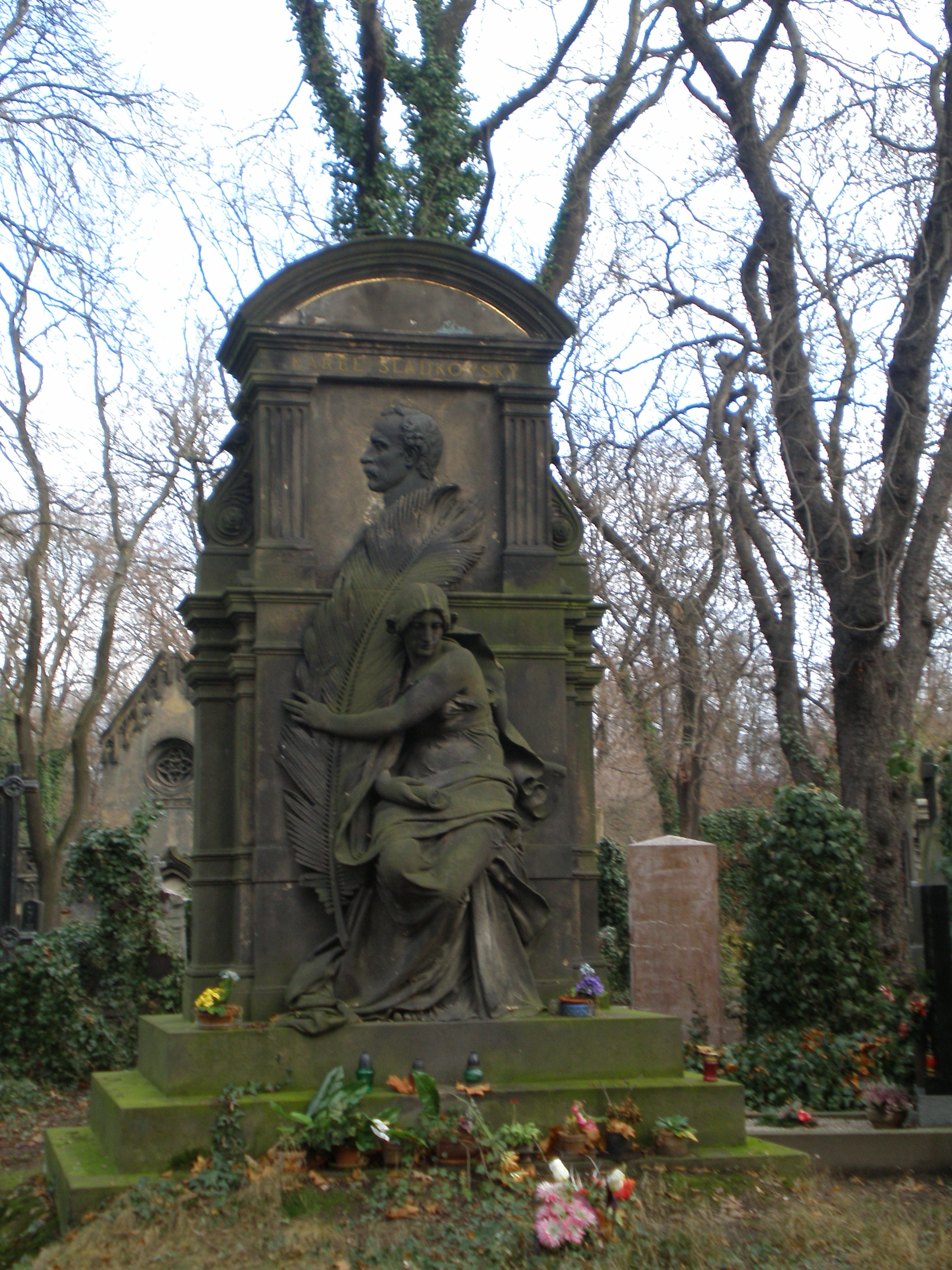
Grave of Karel Sladkovský at Olšany Cemetery

Since the time of his death he was popularly commemorated by building statues or renaming the streets and squares after him, including Sladkovského Square in Prague-Žižkov.
