= In the Well =

1867 Czech opera by Vilém Blodek

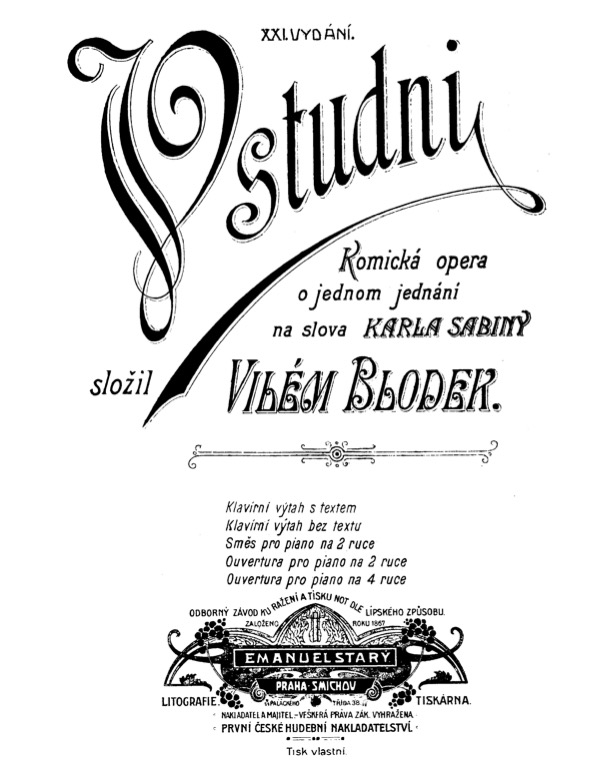
Title page of vocal score

In the Well (Czech: V studni) is an 1867 Czech-language comic opera in one act by Vilém Blodek to a libretto by Karel Sabina, author of The Bartered Bride.

== Roles ==
Roles, voice types, premiere cast
Role	Voice type	Premiere cast, 17 November 1867 Conductor: Adolf Čech
Janek, a peasant, an old widower	bass	Josef Paleček
Vojtech, a peasant son	tenor	Jindřich Polák
Lidunka, a peasant girl	soprano	Terezie Rückaufová
Veruna, an old woman	contralto	Ema Sáková

== Plot ==
Following a folk tradition that a girl looking in the village well on Midsummer Eve will see the face of her true bridegroom reflected, Lidunka hopes to see the face of her beloved Vojtech, and not old Janek the wealthy preference of her mother, and consults the village sorceress, Veruna. Both suitors climb a tree to ensure that she sees their reflection, but Janek falls in the well just before she arrives, and his face comes out of the water. Eventually all is resolved and Lidunka marries Vojtech.

== Music ==
John Warrack, reviewing in Gramophone the 1981 recording conducted by Jan Štych, commented: "The music is agreeable and well made, and the work could certainly qualify for a 'What next?' suggestion attached to The Bartered Bride. However, it is by some way less tuneful, and some of it – for instance, a very attractive moonlight interlude – seems closer to the world of early nineteenth-century German opera than to anything specifically Czech."

== Recordings ==
- 1959: Milada Šubrtová, Štěpánka Štěpánová, Ivo Žídek, and Zdeněk Kroupa. The chorus and orchestra of the Prague National Theatre, conducted by František Škvor. Recorded on tape in stereo in 1959 [71'19]. Excerpts were released in monophonic sound on LP in the early 1960s. Stereo CDs: ADD Supraphon, c. 1996.
- 1981: Karel Berman, Vojtech Kocián, Libuse Márová, Daniela Sounová-Brouková, Prague National Theatre Orchestra, Kühn Chorus, Kühn Children's Chorus, conducted by Jan Štych [66'] Supraphon Original booklet includes libretto and translations. Recorded 24–27 June 1981, Czechoslovak Television.
