= Old Czech Party =

Political party in Austria-Hungary

National Party Národní strana
- Historical leaders: František Palacký, František Ladislav Rieger, Josef Kaizl, František August Brauner, Karel Mattuš
- Founded: 1848
- Dissolved: 1918
- Succeeded by: National Democracy
- Headquarters: Prague, Kingdom of Bohemia
- Newspaper: The National Newspaper
- Ideology: National conservatism National liberalism
- Political position: Right-wing
- Colours: Blue

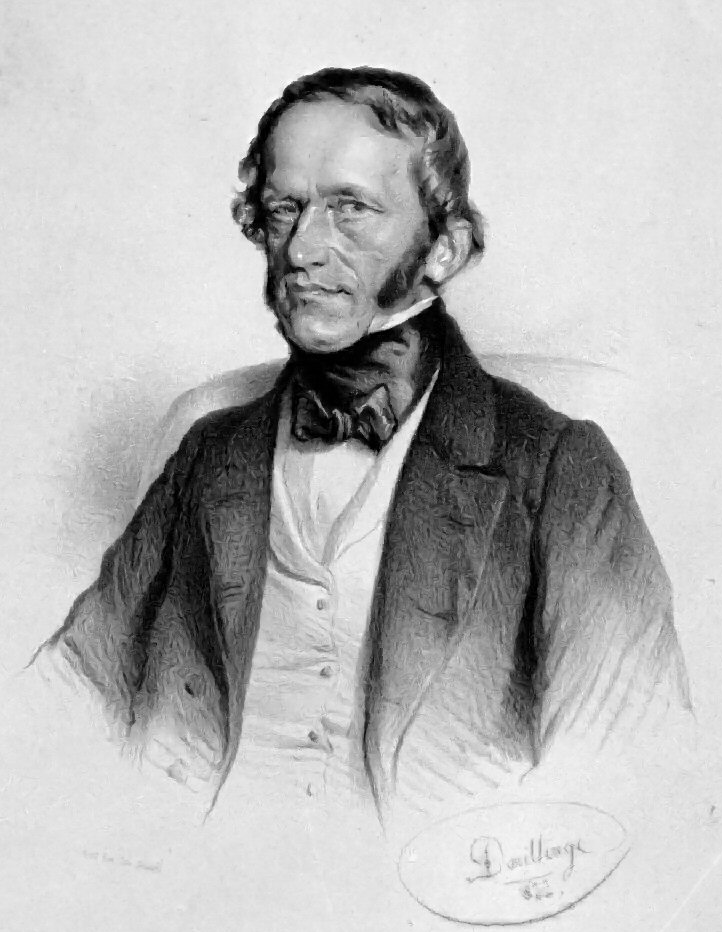
František Palacký, (lithograph by Adolf Dauthage, 1855)

The Old Czech Party (Czech: Staročeši, officially National Party, Národní strana) was formed in the Kingdom of Bohemia and Bohemian Crown Lands of Austrian Empire in Revolution Year of 1848. They initiated Czech national program, forming of modern national through Czech National Revival and better position of Bohemia within the Habsburg Monarchy.

An important event in the history of the party were split of Young Czech wing of the party, in 1874 formed Young Czech Party led by Karel Sladkovský.

== Background ==
The 1848 Revolutions, starting in Sicily before spreading to the rest of Europe, led to the formation of the first Czech political parties in the Austrian Empire. Upon the resignation of State Chancellor Klemens von Metternich, the new Austrian government under Prime Minister Franz Anton von Kolowrat-Liebsteinsky finally ceded to the provisional Bohemian "national assembly" (Svatováclavský výbor roku 1848) the right to hold elections for a Landtag parliament in the Lands of the Bohemian Crown. Though initially backed by the Austrian governor Count Leopold von Thun und Hohenstein, the attempt failed due to disagreement with Moravian and Austrian Silesian representatives as well as the resistance of the German-speaking minority.

In June 1848 the Prague Slavic Congress, led by the historian František Palacký, who had rejected his mandate to the Frankfurt Parliament, demanded a federation of the Austrian states and the withdrawal from the German Confederation. The succeeding "Whitsun Riot" from 12 to 17 June 1848 aimed at the independence of the "Czech lands" of Bohemia, Moravia and Austrian Silesia, similar to the Hungarian Revolution; it was crushed by Austrian troops under Field Marshal Prince Alfred I of Windisch-Grätz. The Czech people were given a taste of freedom of assembly and government only to experience defeat, which was completed with the failed Vienna Uprising and the dissolution of the Kremsier Parliament in 1849. Despite this defeat and its implications, the 1848 experience boosted ethnic nationalism in the Habsburg lands, and activists looked upon the Czech National Revival with pride.

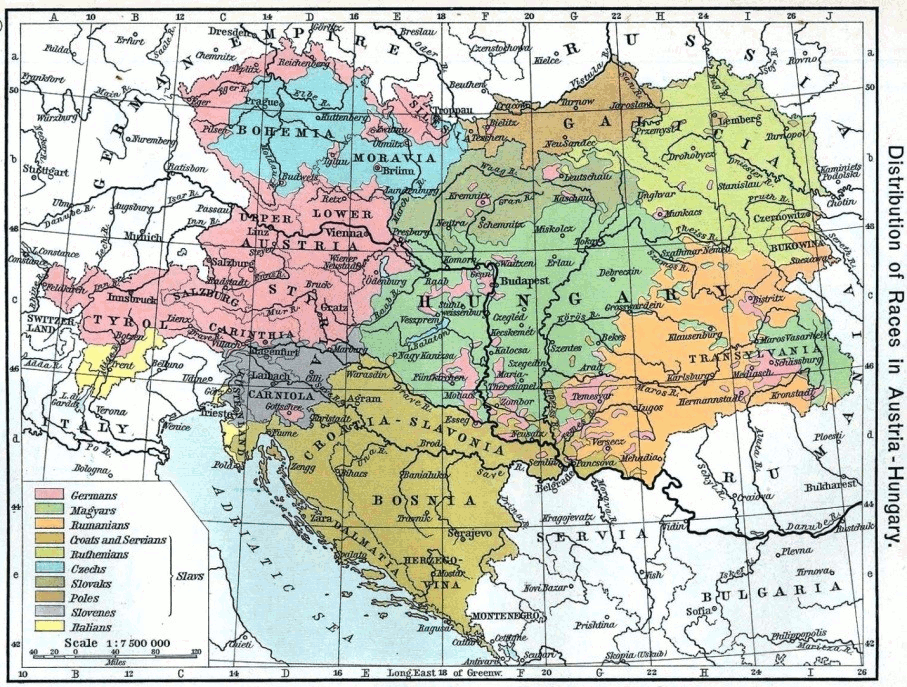
Languages in northern Austria-Hungary according to 1910 census Czech Slovak Ruthenian/Ukrainian Polish German Hungarian Romanian

As a result of the failed revolution, in 1851 the decreed March Constitution was abolished and a non-constitutional system was put in place under Interior Minister Baron Alexander von Bach, deemed "Bachist neo-absolutism". After the defeat of Austria in the Second Italian War of Independence in 1859 Emperor Franz Joseph I of Austria was forced to revoke absolutist policies in an attempt to pacify internal dissent by means of the October Diploma which included the implementation of an Imperial Council parliament. Immediately, a Czech National Party (Národní strana, "Old Czech" party) was formed under the guidance of František Palacký and his son-in-law, František Ladislav Rieger. The National Party sought to achieve a large measure of political and cultural autonomy for the Czech people within a federated Austria.

The February Patent of 1861 from Interior Minister Anton von Schmerling marked an abrupt reversion to centralized ideas applied to the Czech lands. Imperial recognition of an autonomous Bohemian kingdom did not come to pass despite continued efforts by the National Party to receive formal recognition of their autonomy. Nationalities assigned to second class status by the constitutional arrangements of the monarchy in the 1860s could do no more than work for reform within the oppressive and bureaucratic framework of the dual monarchy. Action was dependent on the occurrence of another international crisis which would compel the Habsburgs to initiate real reform and liberalize the constitution. This state of inaction proved to be a long struggle by the Czechs against the authoritarian Habsburg Empire.

== Emergence ==
By 1863, two clearly defined factions within the Czech National Party had emerged: the Old Czechs and the Young Czechs. Their major areas of contention were: the extent to which the party should cooperate with the conservative landowners, how best to define and advance Bohemian state rights, whether or not to passively resist centralization of the monarchy, and their difference of opinion with the Polish insurrection in Russian Poland. The conflict within the National Party that led most directly to the creation of an independent Young Czech Party in 1874 was the issue of passive resistance. The Old Czech faction, under the leadership of Palacký and Rieger, sought to act conservatively against the monarchy through working with the great landowners to achieve greater political influence and by refusing to attend the imperial council (Reichsrat) meetings. The Young Czechs, on the other hand, felt that Czech national interests would be best served by participating actively in all forms of government.

Two events in particular display the effects of the Old Czechs' policy of passive resistance and cooperation with the nobility. The war in 1866 between the monarchy and Prussia displayed how the Old Czechs' policy of loyalty and cooperation backfired. With the war, the monarchy sought the financial aid of its lands and Hungary, also seeking imperial recognition of its autonomy, refused to provide assistance as long as their demands for self-government were not fulfilled. Meanwhile, the Czechs remained loyal to the monarchy but due to fear of further disobedience, the monarchy complied with Hungarian demands and created the December Constitution of 1867 which enacted a dual monarchy. Rieger reacted by advocating a boycott of participation in the Reichsrat until the Emperor suspended the February Patent. Further passive action was taken in withdrawing from the Bohemian Diet with the Declaration of 1868 that called for a tripartite monarchy. The Young Czechs reluctantly upheld the party's boycott of the Reichsrat but seven young delegates defied the party's policy by returning to the Bohemian Diet in September, 1874. This defiance, led by Alois Pravoslav Trojan and Edvard Grégr, heralded the decision to form an independent Young Czech party in December of the same year. The Národní Listy (National Paper) saluted the “seven Maccabees who unsheathed the sword of political activism to defend their homeland” while the loyal Old Czech newspapers decried “the seven Krauts who carried the national cross to Golgotha."

After eight years (1871–79) of boycotting the Reichsrat in protest against the collapse of a negotiated agreement with Emperor Franz Joseph, the Young Czech chose to compromise. Their reentry into legislative politics marked the end of German Reichsrat majority. The Young Czechs held 85 to 87 of the 425 seats in the Reichsrat by 1900.

In 1891, the end of the Old Czech predominance in Czech politics helped to disrupt the conservative “iron ring” parliamentary coalition with whose help Count Taaffe had governed since 1879, and marks the beginning of the modern era of Czech political parties.

In February 1918, the party formally merged with a new coalition, the Czech State Right Democratic Party, which later, under the Republic, became the party of Czechoslovak National Democracy headed by former Young Czech leader Karel Kramář.

== See also ==
- Young Czech Party
