= Prague uprising (1848) =

Armed conflict on 12–17 June 1848

The Pentecostal Storm
- Part of the Revolutions of 1848 in the Austrian Empire
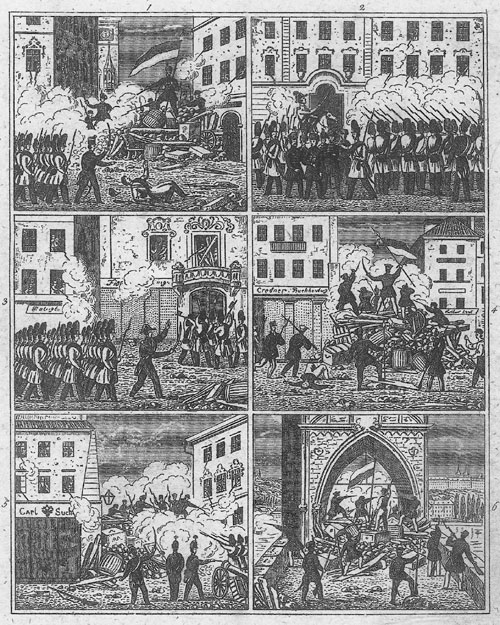
- Contemporary depiction of the uprising
Date	12 – 17 June 1848
Location	Prague, Bohemia
Result	Defeat of the uprising

Belligerents
Czech Radical Democrats	Austrian Empire

Commanders and leaders
Josef Václav Frič; Emanuel Arnold	Ferdinand I Alfred Windisch-Grätz

Casualties and losses
43 killed 63 injured	14 killed 71 injured

The Prague uprising (Czech: Pražské červnové povstání), also known as the Pentecostal Storm, was an armed conflict on 12–17 June 1848 in Prague, which culminated in the revolutionary process in the Czech lands. The spontaneous uprising was suppressed by the army and killed about 43 people.

== Background ==
From March 11, 1848 (Assembly in Svatováclavské lázně) there was a political unrest in Prague, by which Prague joined the wider revolutionary current in the whole of Europe. At that time, Czech politics had already split into a liberal current (František Palacký, Karel Havlíček Borovský) and a radically democratic one (Karel Sabina, Josef Václav Frič, Vincenc Vávra Haštalský, Vilém Gauč, Emanuel Arnold). In the first phase, the moderate liberals prevailed. They preferred constructive and cautious steps, such as the establishment of the St. Wenceslas Committee on March 12. On 19 and 31 March, the Committee prepared two petitions to the Emperor, which mainly included the requirements of linguistic equality, the establishment of the National Newspaper (April 5), the transformation of the St. Wenceslas Committee into the National Committee (April 10), Palacký's Writing in Frankfurt (April 11), founding of the Lípa slovanská association (April 30), and organization of the Slavic Congress (June 2–12). Meanwhile, the radical wing also strengthened. On June 1, its press body, the Prague Evening Paper, began publishing. It was then supported by the arrival of some delegates to the Slavic Congress (especially Mikhail Bakunin).

At the beginning of June, the commanding general in Bohemia, Alfred Windischgrätz, decided that the growing tensions would be dampened by military demonstrations of force – military patrols were constantly passing through the city, artillery batteries were deployed on Petrin and Vysehrad, a massive military parade was held on June 7, with military reinforcements from Kutná Hora and Hradec Králové. This then increased tensions in the city.

On June 11, Prague students met in Karolinum and sent a deputation to Windischgrätz, demanding that the army ease the situation. They were rejected, after which the students issued them as a leaflet and hung them around Prague (the so-called Red Poster). On the evening of June 11, an assembly met at the St. Wenceslas Spa in Zderaz to discuss the situation. It decided to hold a mass demonstration (so-called "fraternal mass") on the second day at the Horse Market (today's Wenceslas Square).

== Uprising ==
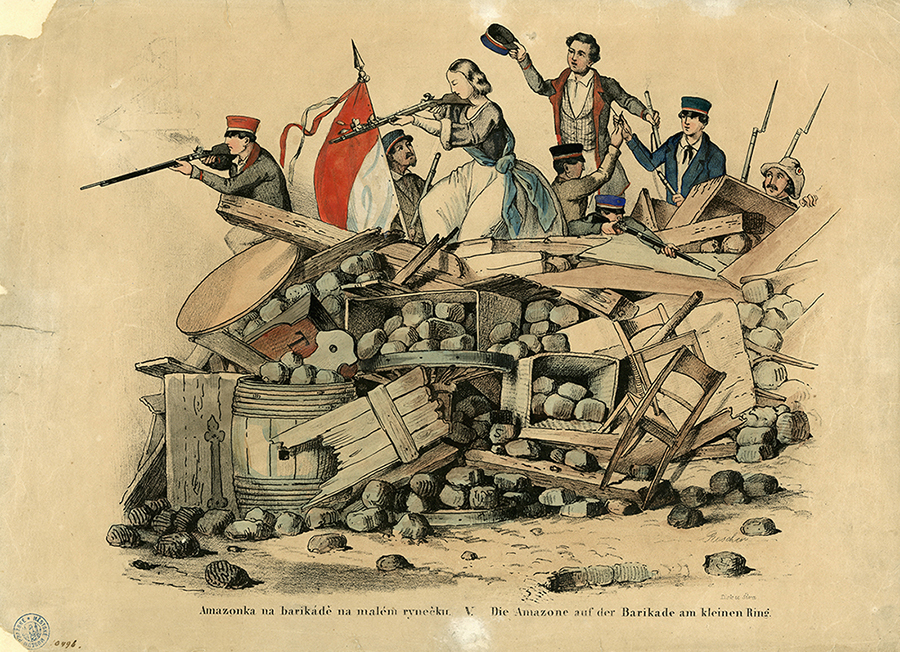
"Amazon" on the barricade on Malé náměstí.

The Mass was attended by the patriotic retired priest Jan Arnold (1785–1872), the brother of the radical democrat Emanuel Arnold. After the Mass, the participants did not disperse and marched through the city in a procession. Around noon, they were stopped by the army in Celetná Street. This ignited a spark of rebellion led by students and radical Democrats (the Liberals stayed away and sought a compromise with Windischgrätz). Many barricades were erected in Prague, where the 12th – 14th century was fought. On the very first day of the uprising, June 12, a stray bullet probably killed Prince Windischgrätz's wife as she stood at a window watching street fights. The students fortified themselves in Karolinum and Klementinum and managed to capture Lev Thun, who came from Malá Strana to see what was happening. The next day, Thun refused to mediate negotiations with the students with Windischgrätz. Thun was eventually released at the urging of Palacký, Šafárik and Borovský.

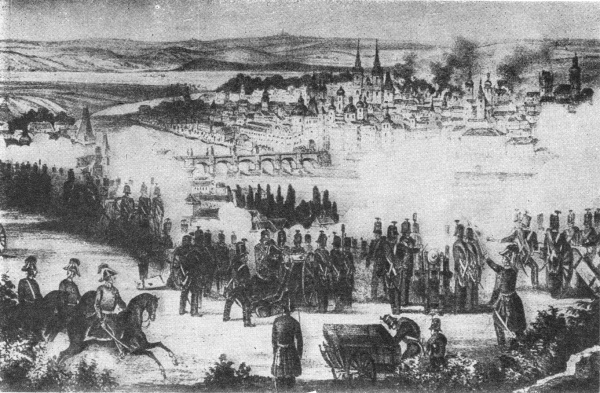
The bombing of Prague by General Windischgrätz's army.

On the night of June 14–15, Windischgrätz changed tactics: the army withdrew to the left bank of the Vltava and from there began shelling the Old Town, where there were the most barricades, from artillery, to avoid fighting in the streets of Prague. News of the uprising in Prague was well received in the Czech countryside. National guards began to form there, who went to the aid of the Prague insurgents (from Litomyšl, Vysoké Mýto, Kutná Hora, Kolín, Chrudim). However, they could no longer influence the course of the fighting, and the insurgents capitulated on June 17. About 43 people died during the fighting.

On June 18, a state of siege was declared throughout Prague and rioters began to be arrested. On June 26, the National Committee was dissolved due to the participation of some of its members in the June uprising. On July 20, the siege was lifted and the situation in the Czech lands calmed down. The revolution then took place mainly in Vienna.

== Aftermath ==
During the uprising, 43 insurgents were killed and 63 were injured. A total of 14 dead and 71 wounded were in Windischgrätz's army.

By suppressing the Pentecostal storm in Prague, the Austrian conservative power tested the possibility of a military solution to the political situation.

After suppressing the uprising, the Liberals focused on enforcing changes in the constituent assemblies (first in Vienna, then in Kroměříž). The radical Democrats attempted a second offensive in 1849 (control of the Lípa slovanská association, preparation of a May Conspiracy in cooperation with Mikhail Bakunin), but on May 10, they were arrested, a state of siege was declared in Prague, and thus the resistance was definitively broken.

== See also ==
List of revolutions and rebellions

- List of rebellions in the Habsburg monarchy
- Massacre in Běchovice
- May Conspiracy

== Bibliography ==
- BAJEROVÁ, Anna. Svatodušní bouře v Praze r. 1848 ve světle soudního vyšetřování. Plzeň: K. Beníško, 1920. 413 s. cnb000561606.
- IVANOV, Miroslav. Podivuhodné příběhy. 1. vyd. Praha: Práce, 1979. 321 s. cnb000145852. [Kapitola „Smrt kněžny Eleanory Windischgrätzové" je na str. 275–315.]
- KLÍMA, Arnošt. Rok 1848 v Čechách. 2., dopln. vyd. Praha: Svoboda, 1949. 149 s. cnb000714657.
- KLÍMA, Arnošt. Revoluce 1848 v českých zemích. 1. vyd. Praha: SPN, 1974. 231 s. cnb000157283
- MAHLER, Oldřich a BROFT, Miroslav. Události pražské v červnu 1848. 1. vyd. V Praze: Panorama, 1989. 301 s. ISBN 80-7038-097-7.
- ROUBÍK, František. Český rok 1848. Druhé vydání. V Praze: Ladislav Kuncíř, 1948. 429 s. cnb000671710
