= Pan-Slavism =

Political ideology emphasising unity of Slavic peoples

Contemporary map of the Slavic-speaking countries of Europe. South Slavs appear in dark green, East Slavs in green, and West Slavs in light green.

Pan-Slavism is a political ideology that originated in the mid-19th century, emphasizing integrity and unity among the Slavic peoples.

== Origins ==
Extensive pan-Slavism emerged much like Pan-Germanism; both movements flourished from the sense of unity and nationalism experienced by members of many European ethnic groups in the aftermath of the French Revolution and the consequent Napoleonic Wars, as a pushback against traditional European monarchies. As in other Romantic nationalist movements, Slavic intellectuals and scholars in the developing fields of history, philology, and folklore actively encouraged Slavs' interest in their shared identity and ancestry. Pan-Slavism co-existed with the Southern Slavic drive towards independence.

Commonly used symbols of the Pan-Slavic movement were the Pan-Slavic colours (blue, white, and red) and the Pan-Slavic anthem, Hey, Slavs.

The first pan-Slavists were the 16th-century Croatian writer Vinko Pribojević, the Dalmatian Aleksandar Komulović (1548–1608), the Croat Bartol Kašić (1575–1650), the Ragusan Ivan Gundulić (1589–1638), and the Croatian Catholic missionary Juraj Križanić (c. 1618 – 1683). Additionally, scholars such as Tomasz Kamusella have attributed early manifestations of Pan-Slavic thought within the Habsburg monarchy to the Slovaks Adam Franz Kollár (1718–1783) and Pavel Jozef Šafárik (1795–1861). The Pan-Slavism movement grew rapidly following the end of the Napoleonic Wars in 1815. In the aftermath of the wars, the leaders of Europe sought to restore the pre-war status quo. At the Congress of Vienna of 1814–1815, Austria's representative, Prince von Metternich, detected a threat to this status quo in the Austrian Empire through nationalists' demands for independence from the empire. While Vienna's subjects included numerous ethnic groups (such as Germans, Italians, Romanians, Hungarians, etc.), the Slav proportion of the population (Poles, Ruthenians (Ukrainians), Czechs, Slovaks, Slovenes, Serbs, Bosniaks, and Croats) together formed a substantial—if not the largest—ethnic grouping. In the 1910 census, more than 60 percent of the inhabitants of the Austrian half of Austria-Hungary identified as Slavs.

== First Pan-Slav Congress, Prague, 1848 ==
The Slavic flag proposed by the Pan-Slav convention in Prague in 1848

The First Pan-Slav congress was held in Prague, Bohemia, in June 1848, during the revolutionary movement of 1848. The Czechs had refused to send representatives to the Frankfurt Assembly, feeling that Slavs had a distinct interest from the Germans. The Austroslav, František Palacký, presided over the event. Most of the delegates were Czech and Slovak. Palacký called for the cooperation of the Habsburgs and had also endorsed the Habsburg monarchy as the political formation most likely to protect the peoples of central Europe. When the Germans asked him to declare himself in favour of their desire for national unity, he replied that he would not, as this would weaken the Habsburg state: “Truly, if it were not that Austria had long existed, it would be necessary, in the interest of Europe, in the interest of humanity itself, to create it.”

The Pan-Slav congress met during the revolutionary turmoil of 1848. In mid-June an uprising broke out in Prague, and during the fighting the wife of Field Marshal Alfred I, Prince of Windisch-Grätz, the commander of the Austrian forces in Prague, was shot dead at a window of his palace. After a short armistice, Windischgrätz bombarded the city, and the next morning the insurgents surrendered. The military authorities expelled the congress delegates from Prague.

According to the Slovak poet Ján Kollár, the Slavs formed one nation divided into four "tribes", each with its own literary language: Czechoslovak, Polish, Russian (East Slavs) and Illyrian (South Slavs). Andrej Ľudovít Radlinský held a similar view.

== Czech lands and Slovakia ==
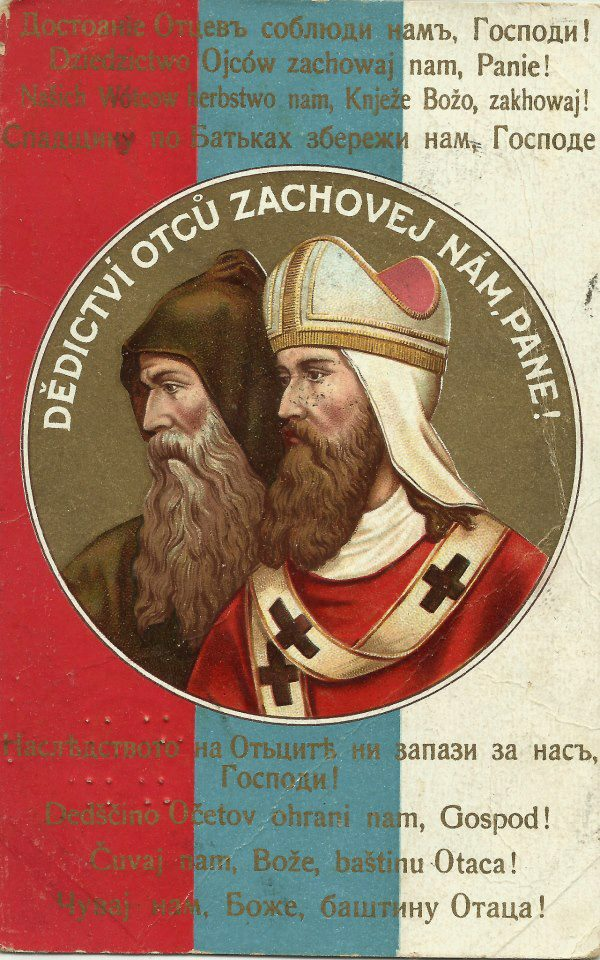
Pan-Slavic postcard depicting Cyril and Methodius, with the text "God/Our Lord, watch over our grandfatherland/ heritage" in 8 Slavic languages.

The first Pan-Slavic convention was held in Prague on June 2 through 16, 1848. The delegates at the Congress were specifically both anti-Austrian and anti-Russian. Still "the Right"—the moderately liberal wing of the Congress—under the leadership of František Palacký (1798–1876), a Czech historian and politician, and Pavol Jozef Šafárik (1795–1861), a Slovak philologist, historian and archaeologist, favored autonomy of the Slav lands within the framework of Austrian (Habsburg) monarchy. In contrast "the Left"—the radical wing of the Congress—under the leadership of Karel Sabina (1813–1877), a Czech writer and journalist, Josef Václav Frič, a Czech nationalist, Karol Libelt (1817–1861), a Polish writer and politician, and others, pressed for a close alliance with the revolutionary-democratic movement going on in Germany and Hungary in 1848.

A national rebirth in the Hungarian "Upper Land" (now Slovakia) awoke in a completely new light, both before the Slovak Uprising in 1848 and after. The driving force of this rebirth movement were Slovak writers and politicians who called themselves Štúrovci, the followers of Ľudovít Štúr. As the Slovak nobility was Magyarized and most Slovaks were merely farmers or priests, this movement failed to attract much attention. Nonetheless, the campaign was successful as brotherly cooperation between the Croats and the Slovaks brought its fruit throughout the war. Most of the battles between Slovaks and Hungarians however, did not turn out in favor for the Slovaks who were logistically supported by the Austrians, but not sufficiently. The shortage of manpower proved to be decisive as well.

During the war, the Slovak National Council sent a deputation to the young Emperor Franz Joseph I, which on 20 March 1849 presented a petition asking him to recognize the Slovak nation within defined borders, with its own diet and administration. The Emperor replied only with a general reference to the equality of all the peoples under his rule. After the revolution, Vienna did not respect the Slovak territorial demands and instead divided Hungary into five districts. According to the historian Pieter van Duin, Austro-Slav hopes may nonetheless have persisted among many Czech and Slovak political leaders, with Štúr exceptional in insisting that they be abandoned.

In the early 1850s Štúr, who had codified the first widely used standard Slovak language, wrote Das Slawenthum und die Welt der Zukunft (Slavdom and the World of the Future), which was first published in 1867 in a Russian translation. In it he turned away from Austroslavism. He also wrote a sentence that often serves as a quote until this day: "Every nation has its time under God's sun, and the linden [a symbol of the Slavs] is blossoming, while the oak [a symbol of the Teutons] bloomed long ago."

He expressed confidence in the Russian Empire however, as it was the only country of Slavs that was not dominated by anybody else, yet it was one of the most powerful nations in the world. He often symbolized Slavs as being a tree, with "minor" Slavic nations being branches while the trunk of the tree was Russian. In the book he proposed that the Slavs unite under the leadership of Tsarist Russia, adopt Russian as their common literary language and convert to Orthodoxy, the religion originally spread by Cyril and Methodius during the times of Great Moravia, which served as an opposition to the Catholic missionaries from the Franks. After the Hungarian invasion of Pannonia, Hungarians converted into Catholicism, which effectively influenced the Slavs living in Pannonia and in the land south of the Lechs.

However, the Russian Empire often claimed Pan-Slavism as a justification for its aggressive moves in the Balkan Peninsula of Europe against the Ottoman Empire, which conquered and held the land of Slavs for centuries. This eventually led to the Balkan campaign of the Russian Empire, which resulted in the entire Balkan being liberated from the Ottoman Empire, with the help and the initiative of the Russian Empire. Pan-Slavism has some supporters among Czech and Slovak politicians, especially among the nationalistic and far-right ones, such as People's Party – Our Slovakia.

The creation of an independent Czechoslovakia made the old ideals of Pan-Slavism anachronistic. Relations with other Slavic states varied, sometimes being so tense it escalated into an armed conflict, such as with the Second Polish Republic where border clashes over Silesia resulted in a short hostile conflict, the Polish–Czechoslovak War. Even tensions between Czechs and Slovaks had appeared before and during World War II.

== Pan-Slavism among South Slavs ==
Pan-Slavism in the south, largely advocated by Serbs, would often turn to Russia for support. The Southern Slavic movement advocated the independence of the Slavic peoples in the Austro-Hungarian Empire, Republic of Venice and the Ottoman Empire. Most Serbian intellectuals sought to unite all of the Southern, Balkan Slavs, whether Catholic (Croats, Slovenes), Muslim (Bosniaks, Pomaks), or Orthodox (Montenegrins, Serbs, Macedonians, Bulgarians) as a "Southern-Slavic nation of three faiths".

Austria feared that Pan-Slavists would endanger the empire. In Austria-Hungary Southern Slavs were distributed among several entities: Slovenes in the Austrian part (Carniola, Styria, Carinthia, Gorizia and Gradisca, Trieste, Istria), Croats and Serbs in the Hungarian part within the autonomous Kingdom of Croatia-Slavonia and in the Austrian part within the autonomous Kingdom of Dalmatia, and in Bosnia and Herzegovina, under direct control from Vienna. Owing to a different position within Austria-Hungary, several different goals were prominent among the Southern Slavs of Austria-Hungary. A strong alternative to Pan-Slavism was Austroslavism, especially among the Croats and Slovenes. Because the Serbs were dispersed among several regions, and the fact that they had ties to the independent nation state of Kingdom of Serbia, they were among the strongest supporters of independence of South-Slavs from Austria-Hungary and uniting into a common state under Serbian monarchy.

When in 1863 the Association of Serbian Philology commemorated the death of Cyril a thousand years earlier, its president Dimitrije Matić talked of the creation of an "ethnically pure" Slavonic people, "With God’s help, there should be a whole Slavonic people with purely Slavonic faces and of purely Slavonic character."

After World War I the creation of the Kingdom of Yugoslavia, under Serbian royalty of the Karađorđević dynasty, united most Southern Slavic-speaking nations regardless of religion and cultural background. The only ones they did not unite with were the Bulgarians. Still, in the years after the Second World War, there were proposals to incorporate Bulgaria into a Greater Yugoslavia thus uniting all south Slavic-speaking nations into one state. The idea was abandoned after the split between Josip Broz Tito and Joseph Stalin in 1948. This led to some bitter sentiment between the people of Yugoslavia and Bulgaria in the aftermath.

At the end of the Second World War, the Partisans' leader Josip Broz Tito, the son of a Croat father and a Slovene mother, became premier of a socialist Yugoslavia, and in 1953 its president. He promoted the ideal of "Brotherhood and Unity" among its peoples.

== Pan-Slavism in Poland ==
Unlike most other Slavic peoples of the Habsburg Empire, the Poles had a strong tradition of statehood. Their state, the Polish–Lithuanian Commonwealth, existed until it was partitioned by Russia, Prussia and Austria between 1772 and 1795.

After 1795, Revolutionary and Napoleonic France had influenced many Poles who sought the reconstitution of their existing country—particularly since France was a mutual enemy of Austria, Prussia, and also Russia. Russia's Pan-Slavic rhetoric had alarmed the Poles, many of whom saw Pan-Slavism as serving Russian interests. Pan-Slavism was not fully embraced among Poles after the early period, and Poles boycotted the 1867 Slavic Congress in Moscow, held three years after Russia had crushed the January Uprising. Polish émigré thinkers nevertheless spoke of the freedom of all Slavs; for them, the Slavic idea meant above all national liberation.

While Pan-Slavism as an ideology was inimical to Austro-Hungarian interests, the Poles of Galicia instead embraced the wide autonomy the province gained and assumed a loyalist position towards the Habsburgs. In December 1866 the Galician Diet assured Emperor Franz Joseph of its loyalty, proclaiming the readiness of Poles to serve the monarchy on condition that they were granted autonomy and that their national rights were respected. Within the Austro-Hungarian polity, they were able to develop their national culture and preserve the Polish language, both of which were under threat in both German and Russian Empires. A Pan-Slavic federation was proposed, but on the condition that the Russian Empire would be excluded from such an entity. After Poland regained its independence (from Germany, Austria and Russia) in 1918, no internal faction considered Pan-Slavism as a serious alternative, viewing Pan-Slavism as Russification. During Poland's communist era, the USSR used Pan-Slavism as a propaganda tool to justify its control over the country. The issue of Pan-Slavism was not part of current mainstream politics and is widely seen as an ideology of Russian imperialism.

== Pan-Slavism in Russia ==
During the time of the Soviet Union, Bolshevik teachings viewed Pan-Slavism as a reactionary element associated to the Russian Empire. As a result, Bolsheviks viewed it as contrary to their Marxist ideology. Pan-Slavists even faced persecution during the Stalinist repressions in the Soviet Union (see Slavists case). In the 1990s, the ultranationalist Russian National Unity party called for a "Greater Russia" encompassing Russia, Ukraine and Belarus.

== Modern-day developments ==
Map of the European Union and Slavic speaking countries. Slavic countries in the EU in royal blue, other EU countries in teal and non-EU Slavic countries in medium blue.

The authentic idea of the unity of the Slavic people was all but gone after World War I, described with the maxim "Versailles and Trianon have put an end to all Slavisms". During the Cold War, all Slavic peoples were in union under the dominance of the USSR, but pan-Slavism was rejected as reactionary to Communist ideals, and this unity was largely put to rest with the fall of communism in Central and Eastern Europe in the late 1980s, leading to the breakup of federal states such as Czechoslovakia and Yugoslavia. Varying relations between the Slavic countries exist nowadays; they range from mutual respect on equal footing and sympathy towards one another through traditional dislike and enmity, to indifference. No forms, other than culture and heritage oriented organizations, are currently considered forms of rapprochement among the countries with Slavic origins. The political parties which include Pan-Slavism as part of their program usually live on the fringe of the political spectrum, or are part of controlled and systemic opposition in Belarus, Russia and occupied territories, as part of an irredentist pan-slavist campaign by Russia.

A political concept of Euro-Slavism evolved from the idea that European integration will solve issues of Slavic peoples and promote peace, unity and cooperation on equal terms within the European Union. The concept seeks to resist strong multicultural tendencies from Western Europe, the dominant position of Germany, opposes Slavophilia, and typically encourages democracy and democratic values. Many Euroslavists believe it is possible to unite Slavic communities without exclusion of Russia from the European cultural area, but are also opposed to Russophilia and concepts of Slavs under Russian domination and irredentism. It is considered a modern form of Austro-Slavist and Neo-Slavist movements. Their origins date back to the middle of the 19th century, being first proposed by Czech liberal politician Karel Havlíček Borovský in 1846, when it was refined into a provisional political program by Czech politician František Palacký and completed by the first President of Czechoslovakia Tomáš Garrigue Masaryk in his work New Europe: Slavic Viewpoint.

== Contemporary views ==
While Pan-Slavism remains popular in moderate and extremist political circles, its popularity subsided in the public. After the failure of Yugoslavism and Czechoslovakism, nationalism in Slavic nations now focus on self-definition and non-ethnic relations (like Hungary and Poland). The Russo-Ukrainian War had a divisive role, and pro-Russian sentiment became less popular. Tensions also rose on the Ukrainian side, and for economic reasons Ukrainian grain exports were banned for a time in multiple Slavic countries such as Poland and Slovakia, after the protest of farmers in multiple European countries.

== Creation of pan-Slavic languages ==
Similarities of Slavic languages inspired many to create zonal auxiliary Pan-Slavic languages for all Slavic people to communicate with one another. Several such languages were constructed in the past, but many more were created in the Internet Age. The most prominent modern example is Interslavic.

== Popular culture ==
Pan-Slavic countries, organisations, and alliances appear in various works of fiction.

In the 2014 turn-based strategy 4X game Civilization: Beyond Earth there is a playable faction called the Slavic Federation – a science fiction vision of Eastern Europe and Western Asia, reformed into a powerful unified state with a focus on aerospace, technological research, and terrestrial engineering. Its leader, a former cosmonaut named Vadim Kozlov voiced by Mateusz Pawluczuk, speaks a mixture of Russian and Ukrainian with a heavy Polish accent. In the historical grand strategy games of Crusader Kings II and Europa Universalis IV, the player is able to unite Slavonic territories via political alliances and multi-ethnic kingdoms. The real-time strategy games Ancestors Legacy and the HD edition of Age of Empires II feature fictionalised versions of the early Slavs that incorporate and fuse elements from different Slavic nations.

== See also ==
- Pan-Africanism
- Pan-Arabism
- Pan-Asianism
- Pan-Germanism
- Pan-Semitism
- Pan-Turkism
- Russophilia
  - All-Russian nation
  - Galician Russophilia
- Slavophilia
- Pan-Turanism
- Neo-Sovietism
- Eurasianism
- Austroslavism
