= 1885 Cisleithanian legislative election =

Council election from 1885

Imperial regions and crown lands of the Austro-Hungarian Empire : Cisleithanien Transleithania Bosnia and Herzegovina (administered since 1878, annexed in 1908)

The 1885 Imperial Council election was held on 1, 3 and 5 June in Cisleithania.

== Electoral system ==
Since 1873, the curia electoral system was in force in Cisleithania. Voters were divided into four curiae according to their status and wealth. The curiae were large landowners, chambers of commerce and industry, large and medium-sized farmers, and all other male citizens living in cities who paid at least 10 guilders (from 1882 five guilders) in direct taxes annually. This corresponded to a total of 6% of the adult population. Women who owned such property were also represented in the curia of large landowners.

== Election results ==
After the elections, the Czech Club (mainly Young Czech Party) had 65 representatives, the Polish Club 56, and the conservative German forces 53.

== Elected representatives ==
List of members of the Austrian House of Representatives (VIIth legislative period)

== Literature ==
- Manfred Scheuch: Historischer Atlas Österreich, 6. Auflage, Wien 2008.
