= Miroslav Ivanov =

Miroslav Ivanov may refer to:

- Miroslav Ivanov (writer) (1929–1999), Czech nonfiction writer
- Miroslav Ivanov (footballer) (born 1981), Bulgarian footballer
- Miroslav Ivanov (musician) (born 1975), Bulgarian guitar player
