= Alois Pravoslav Trojan =

Czech lawyer and politician (1815–1893)

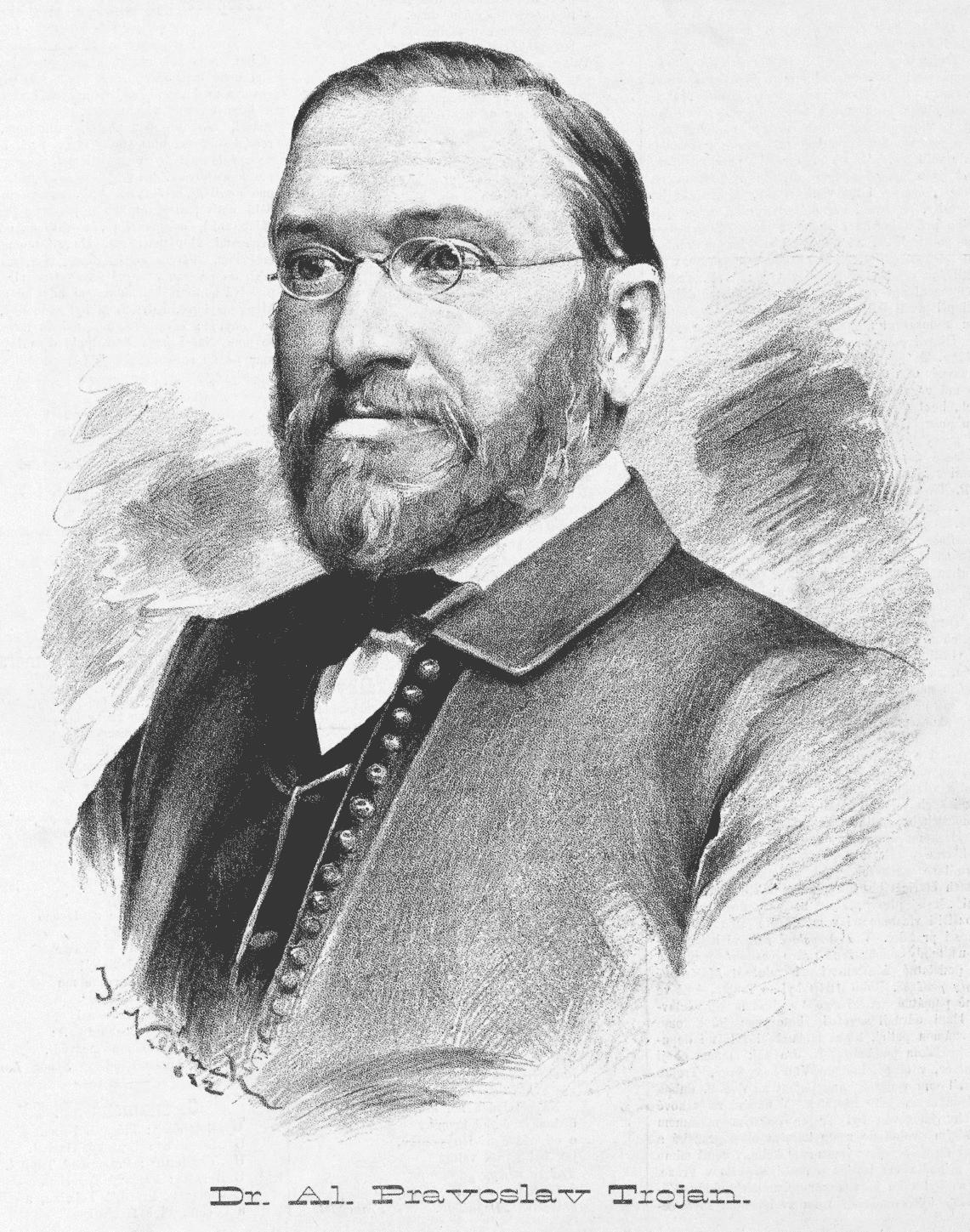
- Alois Pravoslav Trojan (by Jan Vilímek 1882)

Member of the Imperial Council
- In office 1861–1893

Personal details
- Born: 2 April 1815 Knovíz, Bohemia, Austrian Empire
- Died: 9 February 1893 (aged 77) Prague, Bohemia, Austria-Hungary
- Party: Old Czech Party; Young Czech Party
- Occupation: Lawyer, politician

Alois Pravoslav Trojan (2 April 1815 – 9 February 1893) was a Czech lawyer and politician in Austria-Hungary. He was a member of the Imperial Council. He was active in the Revolutions of 1848 in the Austrian Empire, a politician of Old Czech Party, and later since 1880 leader of the Young Czech Party.
