= Eduard Grégr =

Czech politician (1827–1907)

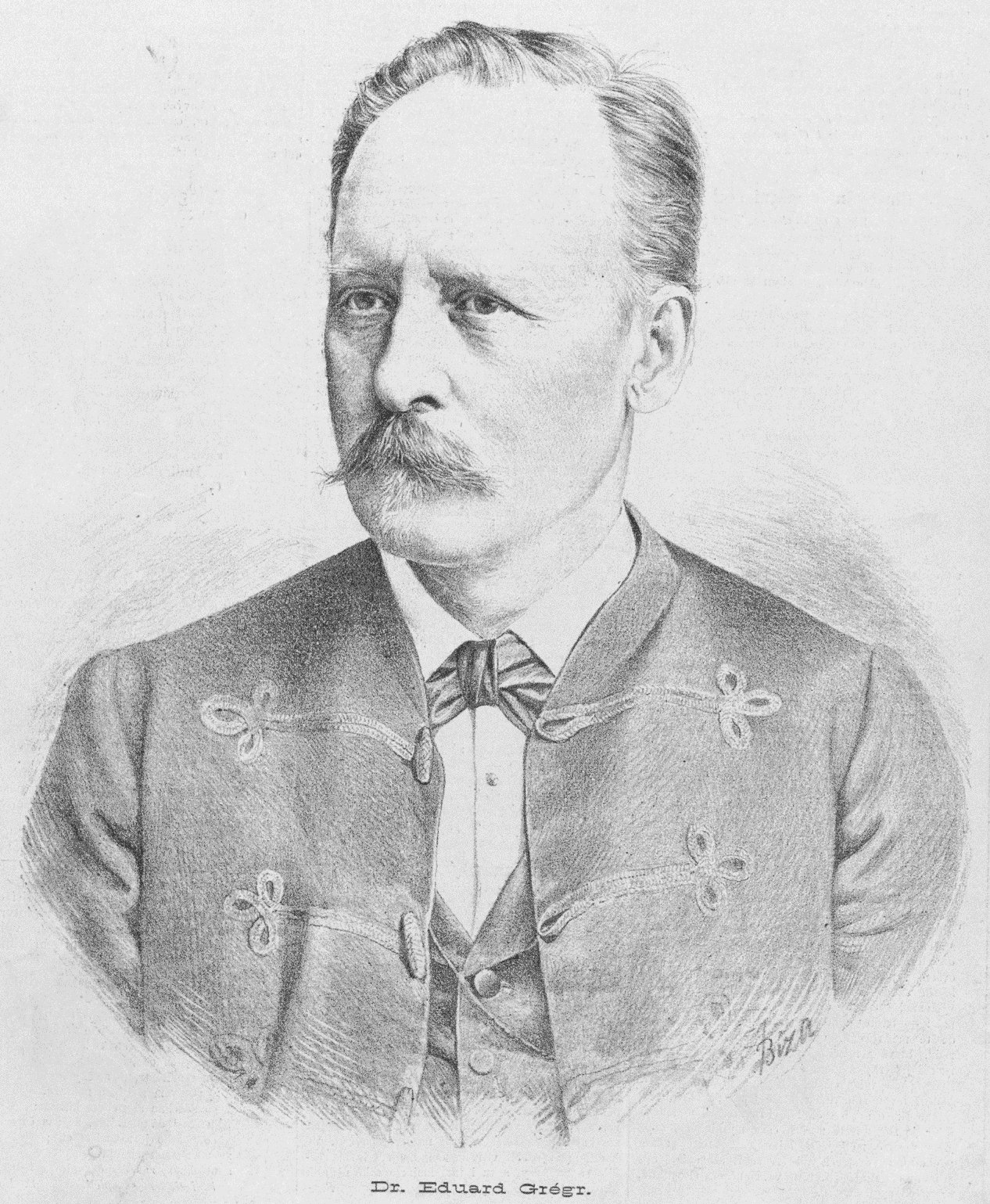
Grégr in 1884

Eduard Grégr (also Gröger; 4 March 1827 – 1 April 1907) was a Czech medical doctor, politician and journalist. Along with his brother Julius, was one of the leaders of the Young Czech Party.

== Life ==
Grégr was born on 4 March 1827 in Steyr, Austrian Empire. He began his career as a medical doctor and writer of popular science articles during the 1850s. After graduating from medical school in 1854, he also served as a research assistant to Purkyne who wrote about anthropology and biology. Eduard viewed science and medicine as the best tools to work towards a more just and rational ordering of society. In January 1861, Eduard joined Julius on the editorial board of the Narodni listy and took a more active managerial role during the times that Julius was imprisoned in 1862. During the 1880s and 1890s he continued to be one of the leading pamphleteers of the Young Czech party. He stopped practicing medicine and conducting scientific experiments in 1862 so that he could focus on a full-time political career. He became the Young Czech party's principal party speechmaker. Unlike his brother Julius, Eduard's temperament was characterized as very calm, warm and generous.

Grégr died on 1 April 1907 in Lštění.
