= František Ladislav Rieger =

Czech politician and publicist (1818–1903)

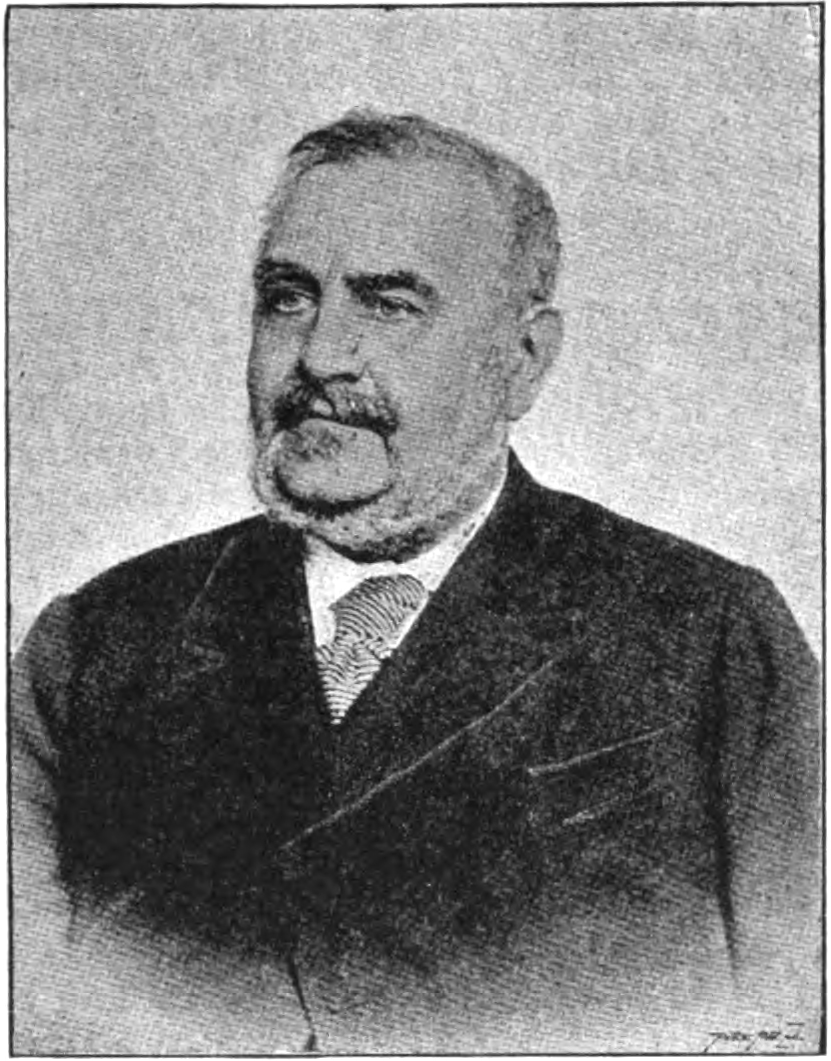

František Ladislav Rieger (10 December 1818 – 3 March 1903) was a Czech politician and publicist made famous for his leadership of the early Czech nationalist movement.

== Early life ==
Rieger was born into the household of a miller in the town of Semily in northern Bohemia. His departure from this rural environment came with his enrollment in Prague University where he was to become acquainted with the nationalist fervor among students there. Rieger studied at the university to become a lawyer and also received a strong education in economic science, a subject that would later be the topic of much of his published political literature. He and his fellow "national awakeners" found inspiration for their patriotism in the Polish uprising of 1830. Many political Polish refugees fled to Prague where they shared their ideas with the young Czech nationalists there. Rieger's sympathy for the Poles was so that he was even arrested for hiding a refugee in his room at the university.

== The Revolution of 1848 ==
Rieger's first venture into the political scene of Czech politics came with the Revolution of 1848. Rieger was among the attendees to the constituent assembly meeting in July 1848 in Vienna. His appearance at the assembly was spectacular. He exemplified his skill in oration, and reputedly gained a reputation for his righteous defense of popular sovereignty. For the first time, he was rubbing shoulders with prominent Czech intellectuals and leaders, including the historian František Palacký, with whom he was soon to become close friends. The constitution which he and his fellow assembly members together drafted was woven from the notions of Austroslavism and late 18th century French revolutionary constitutions, which advocated allowing Bohemia to become an autonomous federal state within the empire and a variety of liberal rights for the citizenry. The new emperor, Franz Joseph, found the constitution too radical to accept and flatly rejected it.

== Retreat from politics ==
Following the defeat of the proposal for the Bohemian constitution, Rieger spent the next two years in voluntary exile between France and Great Britain. On his return to Prague in 1851, he applied to become a professor of economics at Prague University where he studied. However, his application, which included his doctorate in economics, was refused by the administration for political reasons. Rieger continued to pursue economic science and became a prolific writer of economic literature. For his contribution, he has been credited as the founder of Czech economic literature. For the next several years, he set to work on several projects intended to advance the Czech cultural heritage. In 1858 he started the Slovník naučný ("Reference Book"), the Czech encyclopedia of general knowledge, the first volume of which was published in 1859, the 11th and last in 1874. He was also instrumental in founding the first Czech political daily newspaper published in Prague, which appeared on 1 January 1861 and of which he was for a while the editor. In 1853 Rieger married Marie Palacká, the daughter of his close friend and political associate from the assembly, František Palacký.

== The National Party ==
Rieger's refuge from politics was ended suddenly by the downfall of the Bach administration in Vienna in 1859. Francis Joseph's October Diploma, which officially divided the empire into the dualist Astro-Hungarian monarchy, left Rieger and many Czech nationalists dissatisfied with the lack of response by the government towards their wish for autonomy. Not wishing to be outshined by their Magyar competition, the Czechs of the National Party, led by Palacký took action. In 1861, Palacký, though continuing to serve as an influential member of the party, passed official leadership to Rieger. Now in control, Rieger set to work on another petitioned constitution to present to Francis Joseph. Despite Rieger's employment of his skill for writing political literature, the proposal was ignored by the emperor altogether. Increasingly dejected and frustrated, Rieger led his party to boycott the Bohemian Diet and newly created Austrian Reichsrat. This policy of passive resistance would characterize the Czech relationship with Austria for the next twenty years. Czech pride, however, hardly swayed the Emperor or Reichstrat who were more than happy to not be bothered by the Czechs. Rieger attempted a constitution a second time in 1871 when he conducted negotiations with the Hohenenwarth ministry for a federal constitution of the empire, which broke down owing to his extreme attitude in the matter of Bohemian independence.

Within the National Party itself, several significant developments were taking place under the leadership of Rieger. He appealed to Napoleon III to support the Czech movement, in spite of the unease felt by some members towards the authoritarian regime of France. In terms of its political ideology, the party became increasingly conservative in its attempts to win over the Bohemian nobility. Rieger understood that the nobles had no real interest in nationalism and that the party was becoming increasingly isolated from its liberal roots. However, the support of the nobles meant access to the court, a political advantage that he could not afford to lose. In addition to allying the party to the nobles, Rieger took significant steps to tie the party to the Catholic Church. Although a non-practicing Catholic himself, Rieger attended several Church pilgrimages and meetings. In his view, the Church and its role in Czech history offered the nationalist struggle a sense of historical unity and significance. Rieger's image was also threatened by his failure to recognize the significance of Panslavism. In 1867, his journey with Palacký to Moscow to attend a convention in protest of dualism was falsely interpreted by the Czech press to be a symbolic gesture towards Pan-Slavism. Rieger often failed to recognize the impression his contacts with other slavs created for his public image, especially to Germans fearful of a panslavic conspiracy.

== The party divides ==
Despite this evidence of his popularity, his conservatism, his close connection with the Bohemian nobility and his clerical tendencies brought Rieger into conflict with the growing influence of the radical Young Czech party. The National Party was now divided between the Young Czechs and the Old Czechs, headed by Rieger. Indeed, to the younger generation of nationalists, Rieger seemed old and out of touch, as indicated by his comment in 1883 that an educated Czech needs a perfect command of German. After the division of the party, he became increasingly conservative in his policies. He ended his boycott of the Diet and Reichstrat in 1879 and was one of the leaders of the federalist majority supporting Count Taaffe's conservative coalition of Iron Ring. Although the Old Czechs continued to dominate for another decade, in 1891, they were defeated in the polls by the Young Czechs.

== Final years ==
By the end of his political career, Rieger had become an esteemed politician. On his seventieth birthday (10 December 1888) he received a national gift of 100,000 guldens. In March 1897 he was created a baron (Freiherr) and given a seat in the Upper House. He continued occasionally to interfere in politics; but his influence was now at an end, though when he died, on 3 March 1903, his funeral in Prague was made the occasion of a magnificent demonstration of respect.
