= May Conspiracy =

Unsuccessful coup

- Part of the Revolutions of 1848 in the Austrian Empire
Date	May 1849
Location	Czech lands
Result	Conspiracy suppressed before uprising could occur: Leaders of the conspiracy arrested; Prague placed under a state of siege until 1853

Belligerents
Czech Radical Democrats	Austrian Empire

Commanders and leaders
Karel Sladkovský; Josef Václav Frič; Mikhail Bakunin	Franz Joseph I

The May Conspiracy (Czech: Májové spiknutí) was an unsuccessful attempt of radical democrats in the Czech lands to overthrow the government of Austrian Empire in May 1849.

== History ==
In 1844 a group of Czech Radical Democrats which included both Czechs and Czech Germans formed a secret political club called "Repeal". This was named after the mass Irish movement to repeal the Act of Union from 1800. Among the leaders were Josef Václav Frič, Karel Sabina, Karel Sladkovský, Emanuel Arnold and Vilém Gauč. The club attracted radical students and local intelligentsia and remained active after revolutions of 1848 were suppressed.

In March 1849, Mikhail Bakunin, a Russian Pan Slavic revolutionary, visited Prague and suggested to organize an armed uprising in Prague and several German-speaking cities as a response to post-1848 political reaction. The date of the uprising was set for 12 May 1849 but, owing to amateurish organization, police took the organizers into custody on the night of 9-10 May 1849.

Prague and a few towns were put under a state of emergency (also called "the siege", stav obležení), press was put under censorship by the military and a military commission was established to investigate the conspiracy. The emergency was only lifted 4½ years later, on 1 September 1853. Seventy-nine young radicals were sentenced to prison, and most of them were released in general amnesty on 8 May 1857. Others fled to Britain, but had to devote their efforts to survival with little ability to further the revolution as exiles.

Members of the conspiracy

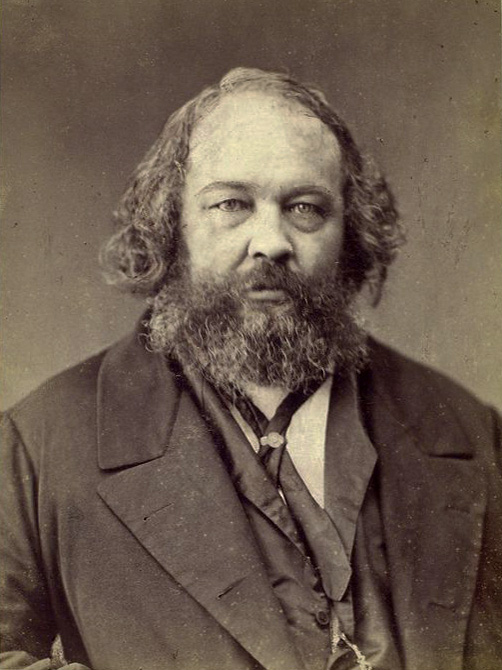
Mikhail Bakunin

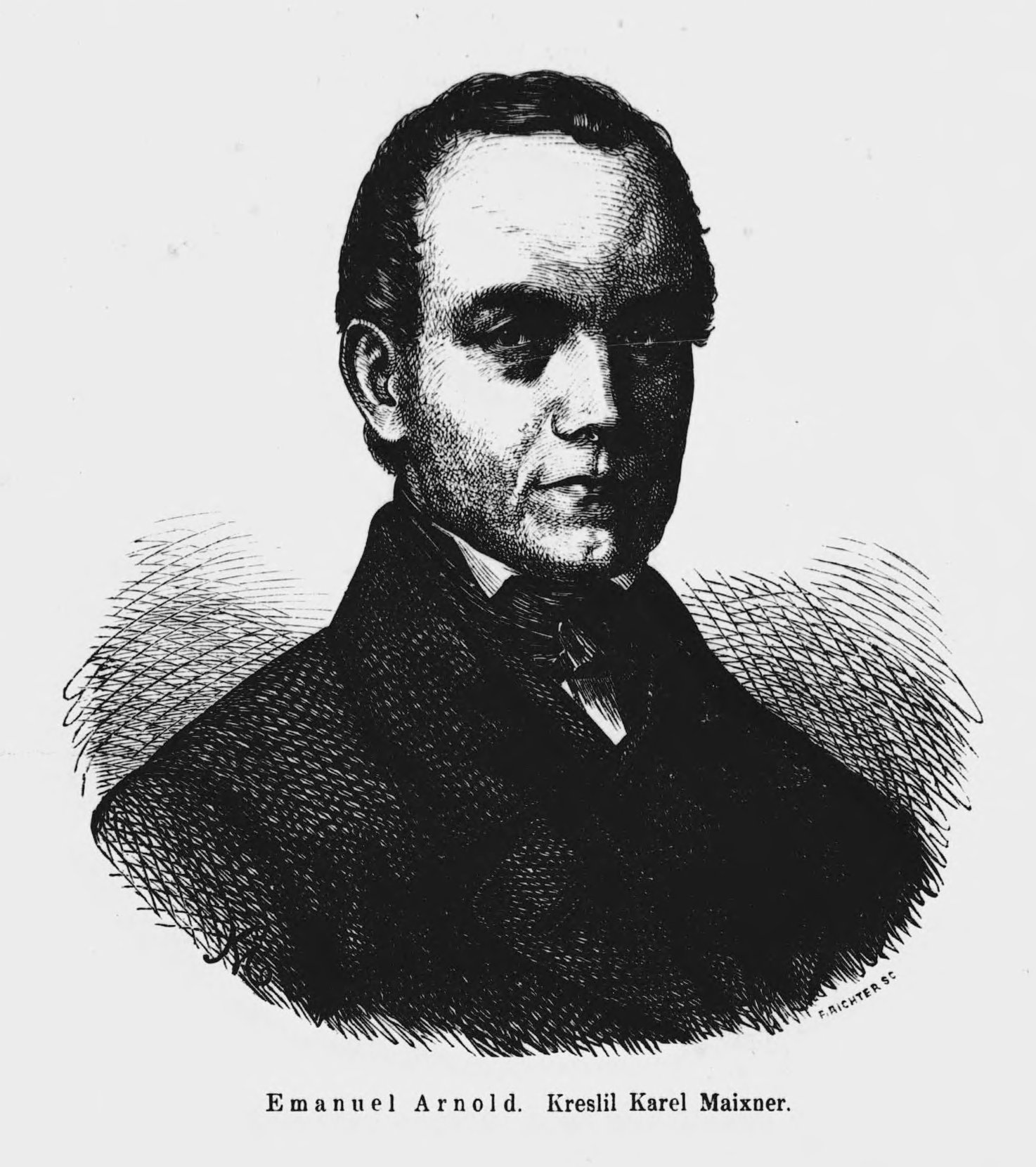
Emanuel Arnold

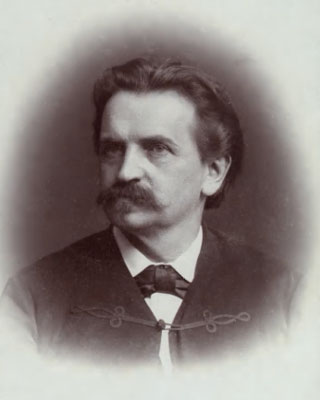
Josef Václav Frič

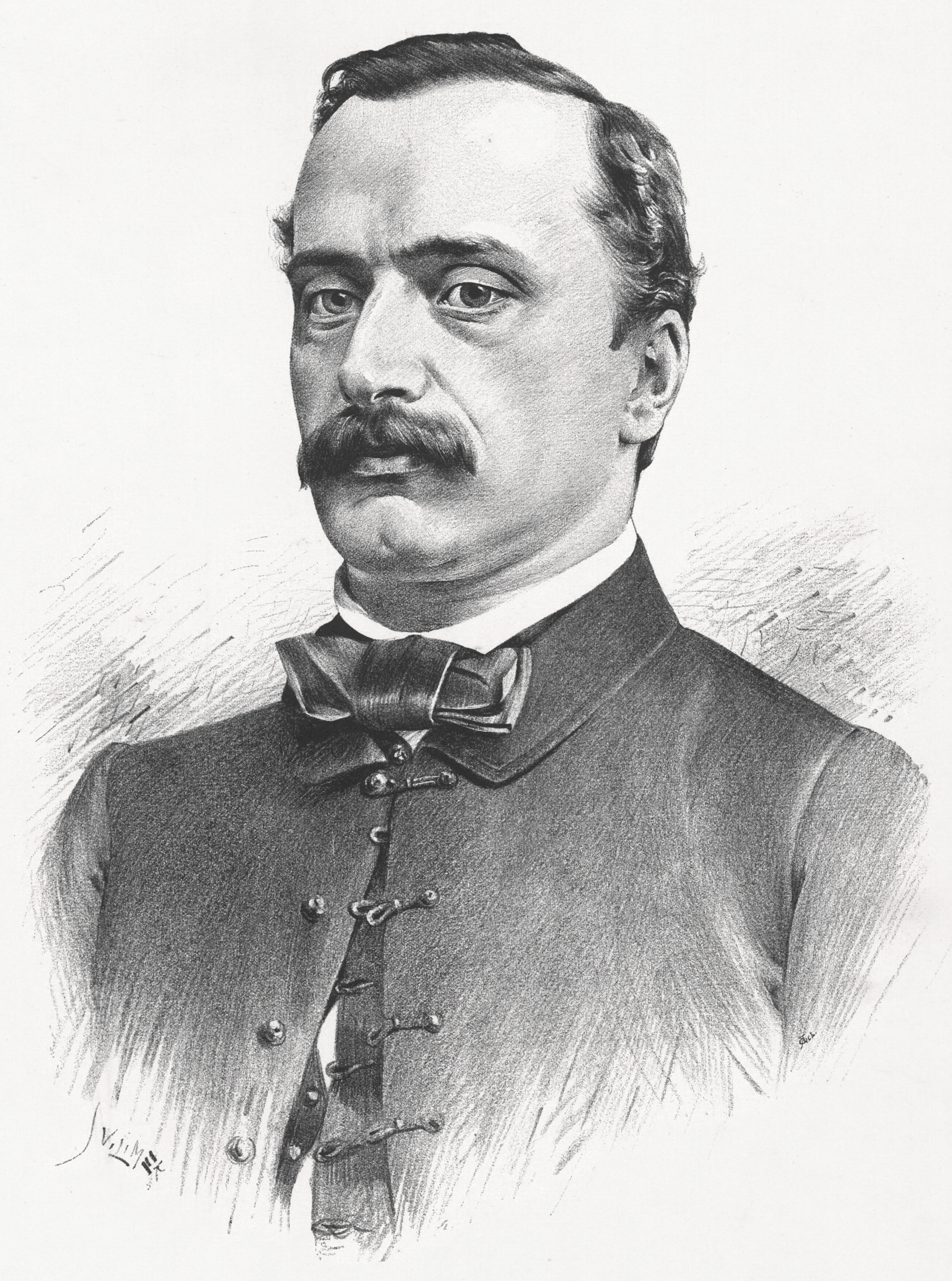
Karel Sladkovský

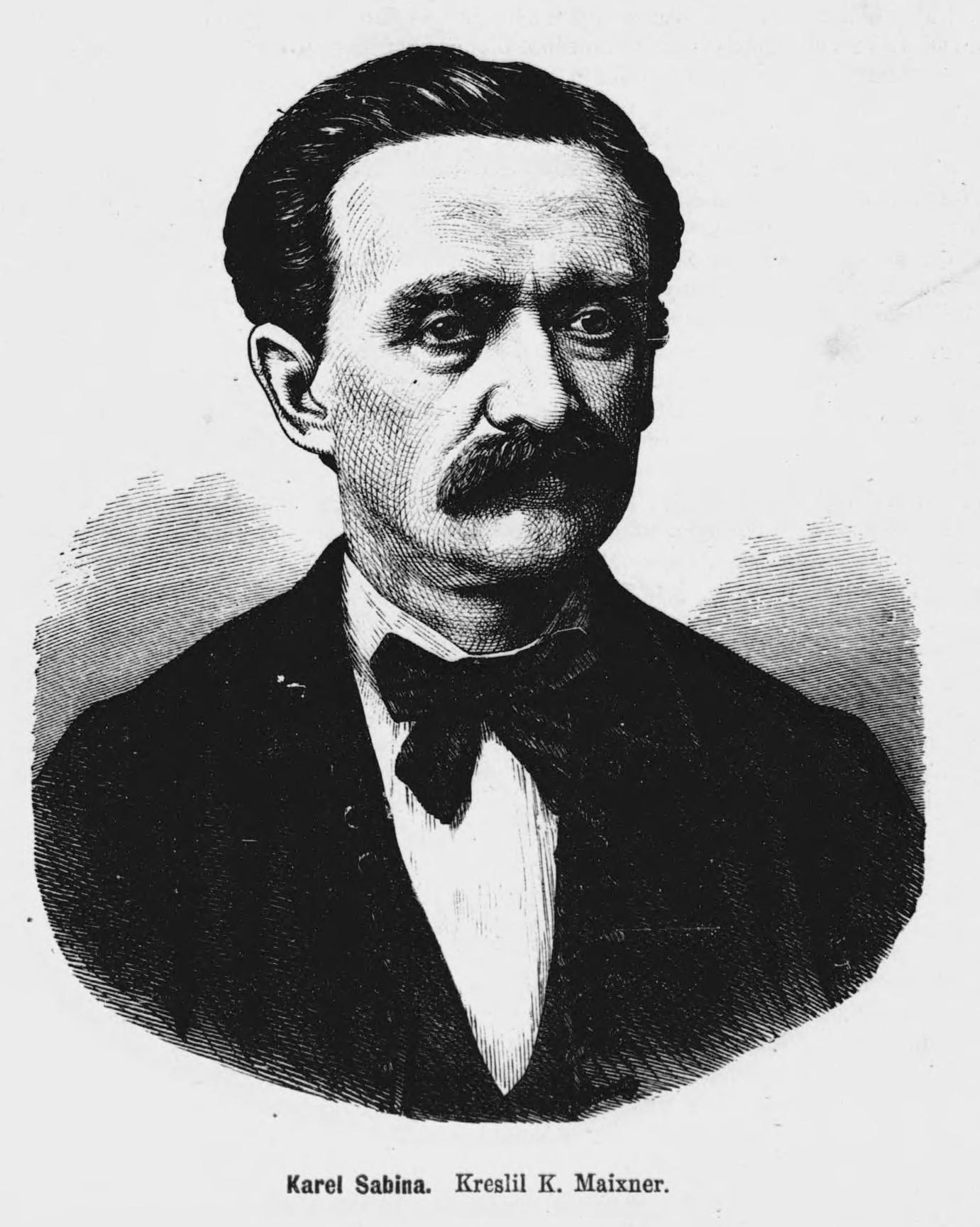
Karel Sabina

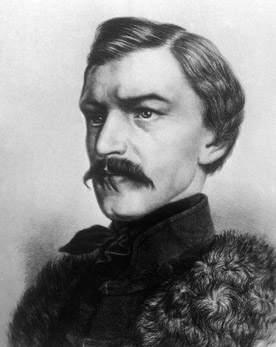
Karel Havlíček Borovský

== See also ==
- Revolutions of 1848 in the Austrian Empire
- Forty-Eighters emigrees after 1848
- May Coup (Serbia) in 1903
