= Young Czech Party =

Political party in Austria-Hungary

National Liberal Party Národní strana svobodomyslná
- Historical leaders: Karel Sladkovský, Julius Grégr, Eduard Grégr, Alois Pravoslav Trojan, Josef Kaizl, Josef Barák, Emanuel Engel, Karel Kramář, Alois Rašín
- Founded: 1874
- Dissolved: 1918
- Split from: Old Czech Party
- Merged into: National Democratic Party
- Headquarters: Prague, Kingdom of Bohemia
- Newspaper: The National Newspaper; The Czech Revue
- Ideology: National liberalism Secularism
- Political position: Centre to centre-left
- Colours: Blue

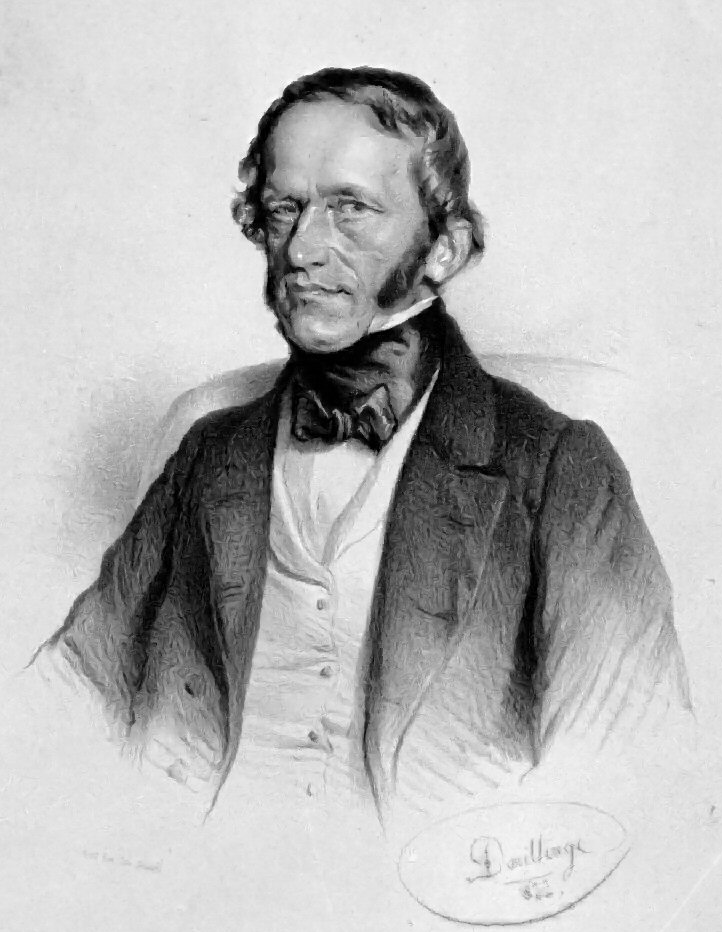
František Palacký (lithograph by Adolf Dauthage, 1855)

The Young Czechs (Czech: Mladočeši), officially National Liberal Party (Czech: Národní strana svobodomyslná) was formed in the Bohemian crown land of Austria-Hungary in 1874. It initiated the democratization of Czech political parties and led to the establishment of the political base of Czechoslovakia.

== Background ==
The 1848 Revolutions, starting in Sicily before spreading to the rest of Europe, led to the formation of the first Czech political parties in the Austrian Empire. Upon the resignation of State Chancellor Klemens von Metternich, the new Austrian government under Prime Minister Franz Anton von Kolowrat-Liebsteinsky finally ceded to the provisional Bohemian "national assembly" (Svatováclavský výbor roku 1848) the right to hold elections for a Landtag parliament in the Lands of the Bohemian Crown. Though initially backed by the Austrian governor Count Leopold von Thun und Hohenstein, the attempt failed due to disagreement with Moravian and Austrian Silesian representatives as well as the resistance of the German-speakers.

In June 1848 the Prague Slavic Congress, led by the historian František Palacký, who had rejected his mandate to the Frankfurt Parliament, demanded a federation of the Austrian states and the withdrawal from the German Confederation. The succeeding "Whitsun Riot" from 12 to 17 June 1848 aimed at the independence of the "Czech lands" of Bohemia, Moravia and Austrian Silesia, similar to the Hungarian Revolution; it was crushed by Austrian troops under Field Marshal Prince Alfred I of Windisch-Grätz. The Czech people were given a taste of freedom of assembly and government only to experience defeat, which was completed with the failed Vienna Uprising and the dissolution of the Kremsier Parliament in 1849. Despite this defeat and its implications, the 1848 experience boosted ethnic nationalism in the Habsburg lands, and activists looked upon the Czech National Revival with pride.

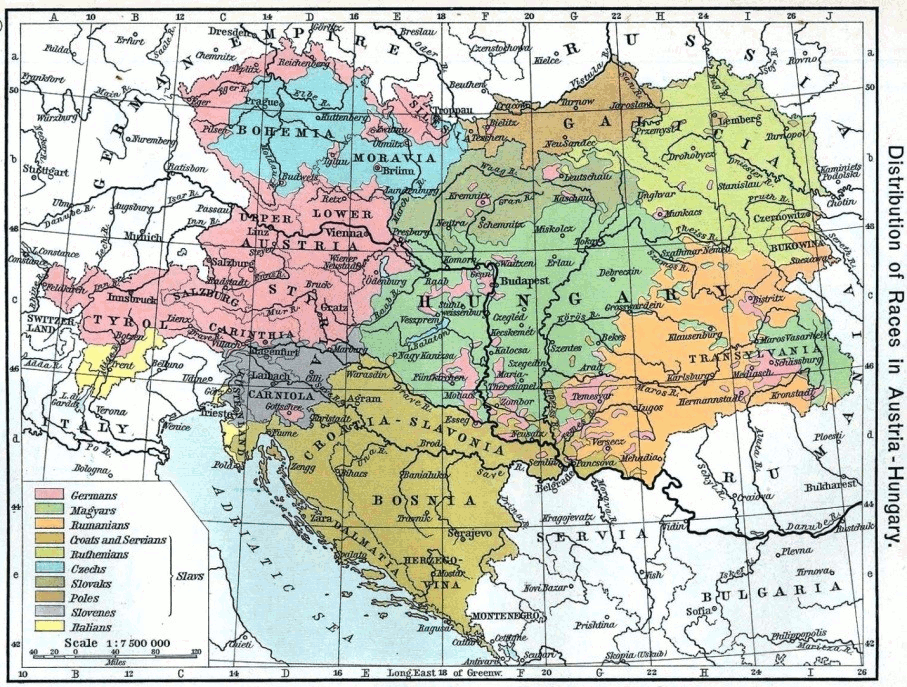
Languages in northern Austria-Hungary according to 1910 census Czech Slovak Ruthenian/Ukrainian Polish German Hungarian Romanian

As a result of the failed revolution, in 1851 the decreed March Constitution was abolished and a non-constitutional system was put in place under Interior Minister Baron Alexander von Bach, deemed "Bachist neo-absolutism". Yet by 1860, due to the lost Second Italian War of Independence, Emperor Franz Joseph I of Austria was forced to revoke absolutist policies with the October Diploma in an attempt to pacify internal dissent, including the implementation of an Imperial Council parliament. Immediately, a Czech National Party (Národní strana, "Old Czech" party) was formed under the guidance of František Palacký and his son-in-law, František Ladislav Rieger. The National Party sought to achieve a large measure of political and cultural autonomy for the Czech people within a federated Austria.

Yet, with the February Patent of 1861 by Interior Minister Anton von Schmerling, an abrupt reversion to centralized ideas spread once again throughout the Czech lands. Imperial recognition of an autonomous Bohemian kingdom did not come to pass despite continued efforts by the National Party to receive formal recognition of their autonomy. Nationalities assigned to second class status by the constitutional arrangements of the monarchy in the 1860s could do no more than work for reform within the oppressive and bureaucratic framework of the dual monarchy. Action was dependent on the occurrence of another international crisis which would compel the Habsburgs to initiate real reform and liberalize the constitution. This state of inaction proved to be a long struggle by the Czechs against the authoritarian Habsburg Empire.

== Emergence ==
By 1863, two clearly defined factions within the Czech National Party had emerged: the Old Czechs and the Young Czechs. Their major areas of contention were: the extent to which the party should cooperate with the conservative landowners, how best to define and advance Bohemian state rights, whether or not to passively resist centralization of the monarchy, and their difference of opinion with the January Uprising in Russian Poland. The conflict within the National Party that led most directly to the creation of an independent Young Czech Party was the issue of passive resistance. The Old Czech faction, under the leadership of Palacký and Rieger, sought to act conservatively against the monarchy through working with the great landowners to achieve greater political influence and by refusing to attend the imperial council (Reichsrat) meetings. The Young Czechs, on the other hand, felt that Czech national interests would be best served by participating actively in all forms of government.

Two events in particular display the effects of the Old Czechs' policy of passive resistance and cooperation with the nobility. The war in 1866 between the monarchy and Prussia displayed how the Old Czechs' policy of loyalty and cooperation backfired. At war the monarchy sought the financial aid of its lands and Hungary, also seeking imperial recognition of its autonomy, refused to provide assistance as long as their demands for self-government were not fulfilled. While the Czechs remained loyal to the monarchy due to fear of further disobedience the monarchy assented to Hungarian demands by creating the December Constitution of 1867 which established the dual monarchy. The Ausgleich, Compromise, gave a unified Hungary a large measure of internal autonomy and an equal status with Austria, but kept oversight and ultimate power in the monarch's hands. Rieger reacted by advocating a boycott of participation in the Reichsrat until the Emperor suspended the February Patent. Further passive action was taken in withdrawing from the Bohemian Diet with the Declaration of 1868 that called for a tripartite monarchy. The Young Czechs reluctantly upheld the party's boycott of the Reichsrat but seven young delegates defied the party's policy by returning to the Bohemian Diet in September, 1874. This defiance, led by Alois Pravoslav Trojan and Edvard Grégr, heralded the decision to form an independent Young Czech party in December of the same year. The Národní Listy (National Paper) saluted the “seven Maccabees who unsheathed the sword of political activism to defend their homeland” while the loyal Old Czech newspapers decried “the seven Krauts who carried the national cross to Golgotha."

The Young Czech Party (National Liberal Party) was formed in Prague with Karel Sladkovský serving as its first chairman. Sladkovský's associate, Vincenc Vávra also became an important figure in the new political party. Sladkovský and Vávra were both 1848 revolutionaries who served to represent the transformation of the revolutionary democratic nationalism into the cautious national and liberal Young Czech party.

== Ideology ==
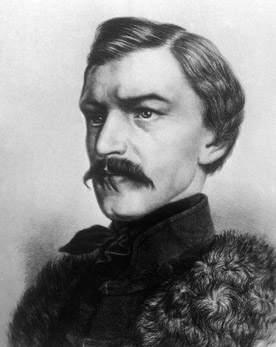
Karel Havlíček Borovský, key figure predecessing foundation of the party

The Young Czechs differed mostly from the Old Czechs in their active politics policies as opposed to the latter's passive resistance policies. After 1874, the Young Czechs claimed to be the heirs of Karel Havlíček Borovský, a journalist and martyr who advocated Slavic reciprocity and criticized the authoritarian Russian government. This, in part, helped establish a “founding father” much like Palacký was to the Old Czechs. Establishing this historic base also provided historical support to the Party's mission and ideology.

The Young Czechs opposed the Old Czech alliance with the Bohemian nobility on principle due to the nobility's opposition of all democratic and anticlerical measures supported by the Party. Furthermore, the Party did not feel that the landowning nobility had the interests of ordinary Czech citizens in mind. The Young Czechs sought to advance the political and economic welfare of the peasants. Moving speeches and publications were made to remind the Czechs of the peasant's contribution to the preservation of their maternal language. This coincided with the party's nationalist outlook. The Young Czechs wished to realize Czech autonomy on the basis of historical and natural rights of the people. The Party also wished to institute universal manhood suffrage and civil liberties as part of their state rights program. More avidly anticlerical and anti-authoritarian than the Old Czechs, the Young Czechs sought to rid themselves of the Catholic Church’s influence and also supported Polish independence from authoritarian Russia. They advocated active and liberal politics and thus, favored a multiparty system as opposed to the one National Party under Palacký and Rieger.

The Young Czechs had wide appeal as they held the professional, petit bourgeoisie, and peasant support. In 1888, Rieger, fearful of the Young Czech's radicalism and potential power, sought assistance from the Emperor but this plea was rejected. In 1889, in the Bohemian Diet elections, the Young Czechs made impressive strides in the rural curia by obtaining 37 seats. In 1890, the Taafe government and the Old Czech party sought a German-Czech compromise. This compromise was never put into effect due to Rieger's blunder in not including the Young Czech Party in the negotiations. The Young Czechs declared the agreement a thinly disguised attempt to increase the political privileges of the Germans. Rieger was declared a traitor to the Czech cause. The Agreement of 1890 even failed to acquire the unanimous consent of the Old Czech party. The Czech club voted to endorse the agreement only on the provision of Rieger's promise of a forthcoming amendment which would make Czech an internal official language in all Czech areas. Rieger received no government assistance in backing his request which was eventually denied by the Emperor. The government further discredited Rieger and the Old Czech party by bribing Czech newspapers to publish articles supporting the government. As a result, it appeared as if the Old Czech Party, who had been leading the Czech nation, was supporting the Habsburg government in its endeavors to subjugate the people and control the press. This fueled the Young Czechs to garner more support as a great majority of the nation transferred its allegiance to their party. The Young Czechs won a sweeping victory in the Parliamentary elections of 1891. The Old Czech Party's hegemony in Czech politics was officially eliminated and was replaced by the majority Young Czech coalition party.

Regarding their attitude towards the Bohemian Germans, the Young Czechs opposed to any plans to administrative division of Bohemia and Moravia along languages, i.e. German or Czech. The expression "closed German language area" was a red rag to them, even though out of 77 purely German judicial districts in Bohemia, 55 formed a coherent whole stretching from Reichenberg to Eger. When Justice Minister Count Schönborn set up the Weckelsdorf District Court to align with the language border, the Young Czechs wanted to bring him to trial. When the expression "German Bohemia", the term for the closed German language area, which had been used without objection by Palacký in 1848, was used by the Austrian Justice Minister von Hohenburger in 1911, a scuffle broke out in the Vienna Parliament.

== Development ==
Both Julius and Eduard were involved in the leadership of the Young Czech Party, which exerted influence in Bohemian politics in the later nineteenth century. Beginning in the early years of Dualism, the Young Czechs were ambitious and arrived on the scene with a striking political agenda of national demands.

In the 1860s the Old Czech were the dominant party in Bohemian politics. They were criticized for abstaining from the election for the Bohemian Diet in protest against the centralist theories of the February Patent. Tensions rose when the Young Czechs supported the rebel cause during the Polish Revolution of 1863 and the Old Czechs condemned it. Julius and Eduard Grégr attacked the Old Czechs for sacrificing liberal nationalist goals in favor of the aims of the Bohemian feudal nobles during the accepted boycott of the Diet in Prague and the imperial Parliament in Vienna. Protests became widespread as the national discontent with the Old Czechs grew. This gave the Young Czechs a strong base of support to expand their political control.

== Height of political influence ==
In September 1874, seven newly elected Young Czech deputies defied the Old Czech boycott and took their seats in the Diet. A few months later, the founding congress of the Young Czech Party proclaimed its independence and issued a wide-ranging agenda that differed substantially from its predecessor.

After eight years (1871–79) of boycotting the Reichsrat in protest against the collapse of a negotiated agreement with Emperor Franz Joseph, the Young Czech chose to compromise. Their reentry into legislative politics marked the end of German Reichsrat majority. The Young Czechs held 85 to 87 of the 425 seats in the Reichsrat by 1900.

The supporters of the Young Czechs came from petty tradespeople, lawyers, progressive intellectuals, teachers and university students, some leaders in the Sokol gymnastic organization and middling farmers hurt by Hungarian and North American competition. Their followers believed in the liberal approach to the nationalist program prescribed by the Young Czechs rather than the more conservative approach of the Old Czechs.

In 1891, the end of the Old Czech predominance in Czech politics helped to disrupt the conservative “iron ring” parliamentary coalition with whose help Count Taaffe had governed since 1879, and marks the beginning of the modern era of Czech political parties.

== Decline ==
The Young Czechs began to dissolve in the 1890s. Problems with the Young Czech reign were the party's inability to win legislation adequate to satisfy rising Czech expectations and needs; government suppression of the labor and radical youth movements, with resultant curtailment of civil liberties; bitter disputes among party leaders and factions; and opportunistic tactics that discouraged progressives and induced them to quit the party.

From 1901 on, the party faced stern competition at the polls from newly founded parties that exploited weaknesses in the Young Czech social and economic programs and organizational structure. The Russian Revolution of 1905 stimulated strikes and other mass movements in the Czech Lands. In the parliamentary election of 1907 Young Czechs lost heavily to the Social Democrats and Agrarians.

In February 1918, the party formally merged with a new coalition, the Czech State Right Democratic Party, which later, under the Republic, became the National Democratic Party headed by Karel Kramář.

== Legacy ==
The Young Czech Party ushered in the democratization of political parties and thus, greater representation in politics. By 1901, the Young Czech Party had lost its predominance in Czech politics. Its decline was accompanied by the growth of other Czech mass parties. The Christian Socialism Party and the Social Democracy Party are examples of two steadily growing and established mass parties. Czech political parties after the year 1900 were organized both as national parties and as parties with specific constituents or interests. This serves to display the greater democratization and diversification of Czech political parties. The Young Czechs, despite decreasing popularity, committed the Party to positive politics and found opposition to be unproductive. The Party thrived with forming coalitions and negotiations with parties such as the Social Democrats and the Progressives. Thus, the Young Czech Party continued to have a very important role in Czech politics. The Czech National Council, which the Party helped establish in 1900, served as the coordinating body for all Czech parties. The Young Czechs remained the strongest influence in the Council up to 1914.

The Czech political parties that emerged at the turn of the century were essentially those that formed the political, social, and economic base of the First Czechoslovak Republic, Czechoslovakia. The Young Czech Party (National Liberal Party), with its democratic and liberal leadership, successfully helped establish a separate and independent Czech state through leading and democratizing its politics.

== See also ==
- Neo-Slavism
