= Vilém Blodek =

Czech composer, flautist and pianist

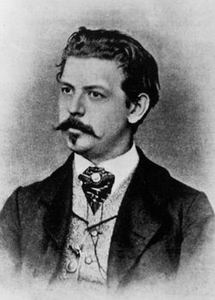
Vilém Blodek

Vilém Blodek, born Vilém František Plodek (3 October 1834 – 1 May 1874), was a Czech composer, flautist and pianist.

== Biography ==
Blodek was born on 3 October 1834 in Prague, Bohemia, Austrian Empire into a poor family and was educated at a German Piarist school in Prague. After studying with Alexander Dreyschock (piano) and at the Prague Conservatory (1846–52) with Antonín Eiser (flute) and Johann Friedrich Kittl (composition), he became a music teacher in Lubycza, Galicia (1853–5). On returning to Prague, he worked as a concert pianist and music teacher and, briefly, as second conductor of the Prague Männergesangverein, for which he wrote a number of patriotic choruses.

In 1860 he succeeded Anton Eiser as professor of flute at the conservatory, and, as a basis for teaching, he wrote his own flute tutor (1861). He was active as a writer of incidental music for the German and Czech theatres: from 1858 onwards he wrote music for 60 plays and collaborated with Bedřich Smetana on music for the tableaux for the 1864 Shakespeare celebrations.

In 1865, Blodek married Marie Doudlebská, whom he had previously taught. In 1870, he became mentally ill, with this being ascribed to overwork, and stayed for four years in an asylum. He died in Prague on 1 May 1874, at the age of 39.

== Style ==
Blodek began composing at the conservatory at the age of 13 (wind sextet, 1847) in a style that owed much to his teacher Kittl, to Mendelssohn, and to the early German Romantics. His Symphony in D minor (1858–1859) was his most ambitious work at the time. His Flute Concerto (1862) is a brilliant and attractive flute work.

Blodek's best-known work is his one-act opera V studni (In the Well), first performed at the Provisional Theater in November 1867. One of several comic village operas written to Sabina librettos (The Bartered Bride is the most famous), it has a cast of four characters and is made up of a handful of closed numbers: five solos, two duets, one quartet, an overture and an intermezzo, and three brief ensembles for chorus and soloists. It was the first Czech comic opera to replace spoken dialogue with recitative. Blodek's opera is often considered to be one of the most 'Czech' operas after those of Smetana – it was written shortly after the première of The Bartered Bride. Blodek's next opera, Zítek, again to a Sabina libretto (a historical comedy set in the 14th century), was a more ambitious work both in its musical vocabulary and in its operatic form. A full-length three-act opera with a large cast, it made some attempt to break down the divisions between the closed numbers of its predecessor, using arioso and a chorus more integrated into the action. Blodek completed only one act and part of the second before his death; Smetana, already ill, declined to finish it, but it was eventually completed by F.X. Vaňa and was performed for the first time in 1934 on the 100th anniversary of Blodek's birth.

== Works ==
Principal publishers: Urbánek, Vilímek, E. Starý, J.A. Christophe & Kuhé, Český hudební fond
Stage

- Mlhavé obrazy (Misty Pictures), Incidental music (Prague, 1859); music to the play by J. Brandeis; lost
- Clarissa, Opera (1861); unfinished; lost
- Choralista aneb Čtverákovský z Žertovic (The Chorister, or Čtverákovský from Žertovice), Vaudeville (1861, Prague, 22 March 1862); libretto by František Hainiš-Zdobnický; lost
- Suita perdita: Hudba k slavnosti Shakespeareově (Music for the Shakespeare Celebrations) (Prague, Novoměstské divadlo, 23 April 1864)
- V studni (In the Well), Comic Opera in 1 act (Prague, Provisional Theatre, 17 November 1867); libretto by Karel Sabina
- Svatojánská pouť (St John's Pilgrimage), Incidental music (Prague, 1868); music for the play by František Ferdinand Šamberk
- Zítek, Comic Opera in 3 acts (1868–1869); libretto by Karel Sabina; unfinished; completed by František Xaver Váňa (Prague, National Theatre, 3 October 1934)
- Incidental music to approximately 60 plays

Orchestral

- Concert Overture in C major, Op. 2 (1850)
- Overture in D major (1854)
- Symphony in D minor (1858–1859)
- Concert Overture in E major (1859)
- Overture in E minor (1862)

Concertante

- Flute Concerto in D major (1862); published by Jindřich Kàan (Prague, 1903)
- Skladba (Composition) in A major for 2 flutes and orchestra (?1862)

Chamber music

- Sextet in D major for flute, 2 violins, oboe, horn, and trombone (1847)
- Salon Piece in C major for violin and piano (1850)
- Grand solo in D major for flute and piano, Op. 1 (1851); lost
- Allegro bravour in D major for flute and piano (1852); lost
- Fantasie e capriccio in F major for flute and piano (1863)
- Andante cantabile for cello and piano (1863)

Piano

- Lípový lístek (Linden Leaf) for piano 4-hands
- Impromptu – Scherzo – Valčík – Barkarola (Fischerlied)

Vocal

- Die Kapelle, Songs for voice and piano (1951); words by Ludwig Uhland
- Písně milostné (Love Songs) for voice and piano (c.1860, Prague, 1909); Czech translation by Karel Hašler

1. Hoře (Wehmut); words by Joseph Freiherr von Eichendorff
2. Předsevzetí (Vorsatz); words by Robert Prutz
3. Květy lotosu (Die Lotosblume); words by Heinrich Heine
4. Jen Ty! (Nur Du); words by Ludwig Uhland
5. Kdybych byl ptáčetem (Wann i a Vögerl wär); words by J. Körnlein
6. Sladce spi! (Gute Nacht); words by Robert Reinick
7. Návrat pocestného (Wanderers Heimkehr); anonymous words
8. Znám jednu perlu krásnou (Ich kenne eine Perle); words by Eduard Maria Öttinger
9. Ty v dálce dlíš (Du bist fern); words by Emanuel Geibel
10. Ptáčku můj poslíčku (Vöglein mein Bote); words by Johann Gabriel Seidl
11. Loučení (Abschied vom Walde); words by Joseph Freiherr von Eichendorff
12. Krádež (Diebstahl); words by Robert Reinick
13. Nocturno (Nachtgedanken); anonymous words

- Dvě písně ve snadném slohu (Two Songs in Easy Style)

Choral

- Abschied vom Walde for chorus (c.1855)
- Náš zpěv for chorus (1859); words by Vítězslav Hálek
- 6 mužských sborů (6 Male Choruses) (1859)
- K bratrům (To the Brothers)
- Ach ty Labe tiché (O Quiet Elbe) for male chorus (1865)
- Pijácká (Společná) (A Drinking-Song, A Social Song) for male chorus (1867)
- Pochod (March) for male chorus (1867)
- Starý ženich (The Old Groom) for male chorus; words by Karel Sabina
- Lovecká (Hunting), Hymn; words by Václav Jaromír Picek
- Festmesse ke cti Nejsvětější Trojice (Solemn Mass in Honor of the Holy Trinity) (1863)
- Mše D dur (Mass in D major) (1865)
- Ave Maria in C major for mixed chorus (1859, Prague 1888)
- Otče náš (Our Father) in F major for male chorus (1863)
- Veni creator for mixed chorus (1863)
- Adoramus in A minor (mužský sbor, hudba k Raffaelovu obrazu Sixtinská Madona).
- Offertorium; lost
- 20 choruses for male voices, some to German texts by Joseph von Eichendorff, Heinrich Heine, and Adalbert von Chamisso, and to Czech texts by Václav Hanka, Jiljí Vratislav Jahn, Václav Jaromír Picek, and Karel Sabina; several published
