= Stránecká Zhoř =

- Municipality
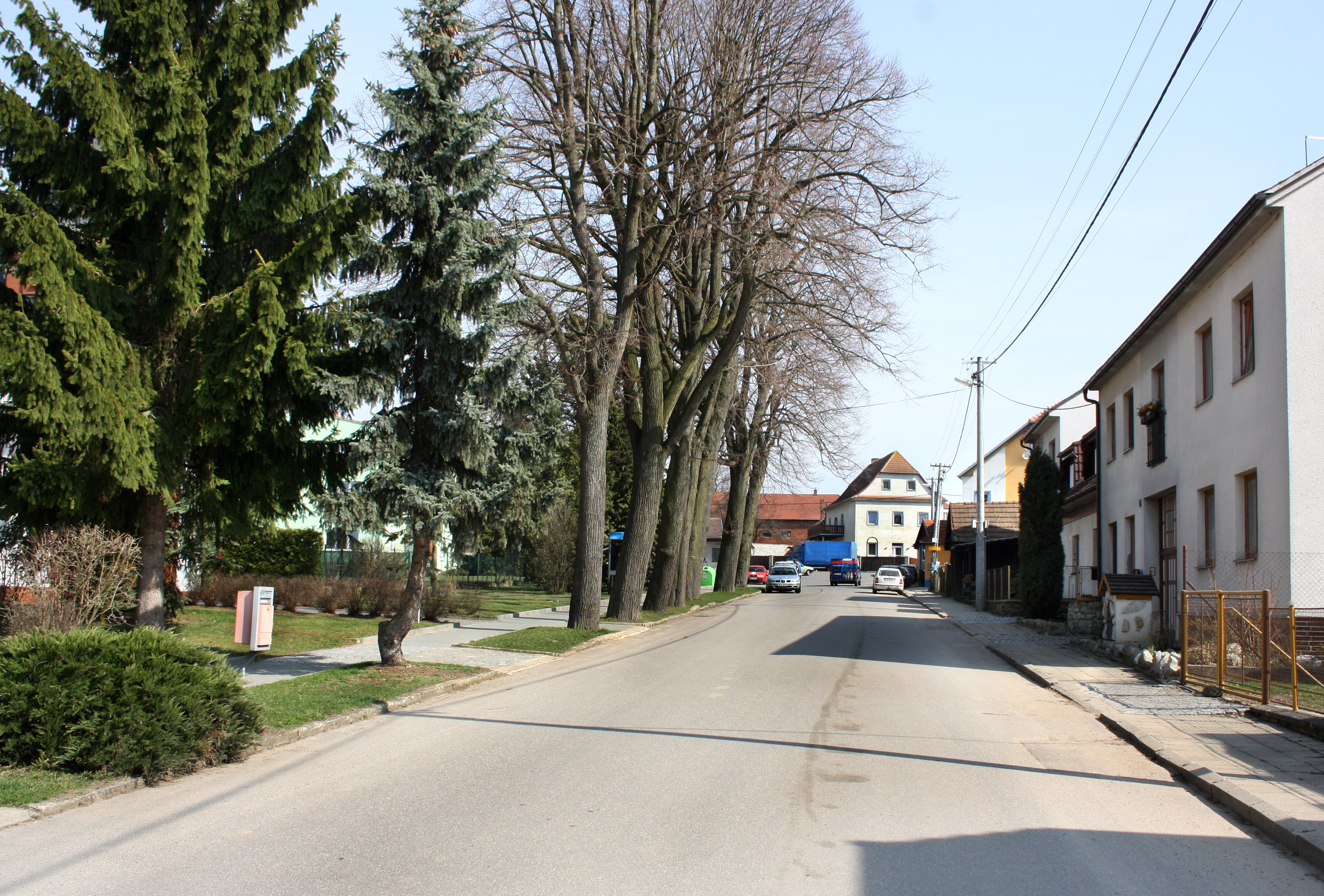
- Centre of Stránecká Zhoř

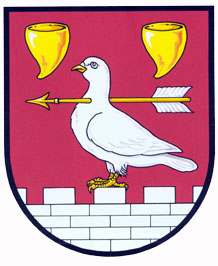
- Flag Coat of arms

- Location in the Czech Republic
- Coordinates: 49°22′48″N 15°55′39″E
- Country: Czech Republic
- Region: Vysočina
- District: Žďár nad Sázavou
- First mentioned: 1414

Area
  - Total: 11.91 km^{2} (4.60 sq mi)
- Elevation: 497 m (1,631 ft)

Population (2026-01-01)
  - Total: 601
  - Density: 50.5/km^{2} (131/sq mi)
- Time zone: UTC+1 (CET)
  - Summer (DST): UTC+2 (CEST)
- Postal codes: 594 01, 594 42
- Website: www.straneckazhor.cz

Stránecká Zhoř is a municipality and village in Žďár nad Sázavou District in the Vysočina Region of the Czech Republic. It has about 600 inhabitants.

Stránecká Zhoř lies approximately 21 kilometres (13 mi) south of Žďár nad Sázavou, 25 kilometres (16 mi) east of Jihlava, and 134 kilometres (83 mi) south-east of Prague.

== Administrative division ==
Stránecká Zhoř consists of four municipal parts (in brackets population according to the 2021 census):

- Stránecká Zhoř (400)
- Frankův Zhořec (47)
- Kochánov (106)
- Nová Zhoř (37)

== Demographics ==
Historical population
Year	Pop.	±%
1869	620	—
1880	669	+7.9%
1890	616	−7.9%
1900	619	+0.5%
1910	600	−3.1%
1921	613	+2.2%
1930	597	−2.6%
1950	568	−4.9%
1961	632	+11.3%
1970	599	−5.2%
1980	551	−8.0%
1991	560	+1.6%
2001	587	+4.8%
2011	580	−1.2%
2021	590	+1.7%
Source: Censuses
