= Josef Václav Frič =

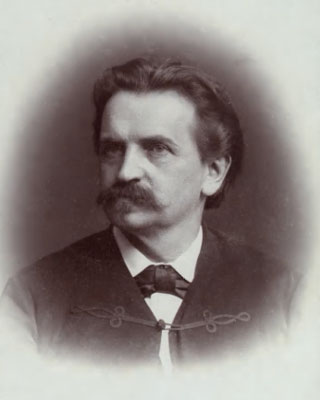
Josef Václav Frič

Josef Václav Frič (5 September 1829 – 14 October 1890) was a Czech poet, journalist and radical democrat revolutionary. He was a participant in the revolution of 1848.

== Life ==
Frič was born on 5 September 1829 in Prague, Bohemia, Austrian Empire. When he was still in high school, he joined the illegal activities of the radical democrats. He had to flee from Prague (1846) and worked in Paris and London, among the Polish emigrants. In 1847, he returned to Prague and joined the secret society Repeal. In June 1848, Repeal launched an armed struggle. Frič organized fighting on the barricades. After the defeat of the rebellion he fled to Vienna, then to Zagreb and later he joined the Slovak revolutionary army of Ľudovít Štúr. In Slovakia he was seriously wounded.

In 1849, after an amnesty in Austria, he returned to Prague. He formed a new radical democratic organization Českomoravské bratrstvo (Bohemian-Moravian Brotherhood). During preparations for a new rebellion he was arrested. He was sentenced to 18 years in prison in Komárno. In 1854, he was released and lived in Prague under police supervision.

Barred from political activity, he joined the literary life and helped to create the almanac Máj, in which he announced a new generation of poets, with Jan Neruda as their leader. However, in 1858 he was arrested again and sent into exile in Transylvania. In 1859 he was allowed to emigrate, subsequently living in London and Paris. In exile he founded the magazines Čech and Blaník.

In 1879, he was allowed to return to Prague. The new political situation for him was unintelligible, so he focused only on literature and writing memoirs. He was one of the few Czech politicians of the 19th century to demand a break from Austria-Hungary. He worked closely with the radical democrats in other countries (Mierosławski, Herzen, Bakunin, Garibaldi, Kossuth). His most important literary work is the patriotic poem The Vampire (1849).

Frič died on 14 October 1890 in Královské Vinohrady (now Vinohrady district of Prague), aged 61. He was buried at the Vyšehrad Cemetery in Prague.
