= Lštění =

- Municipality
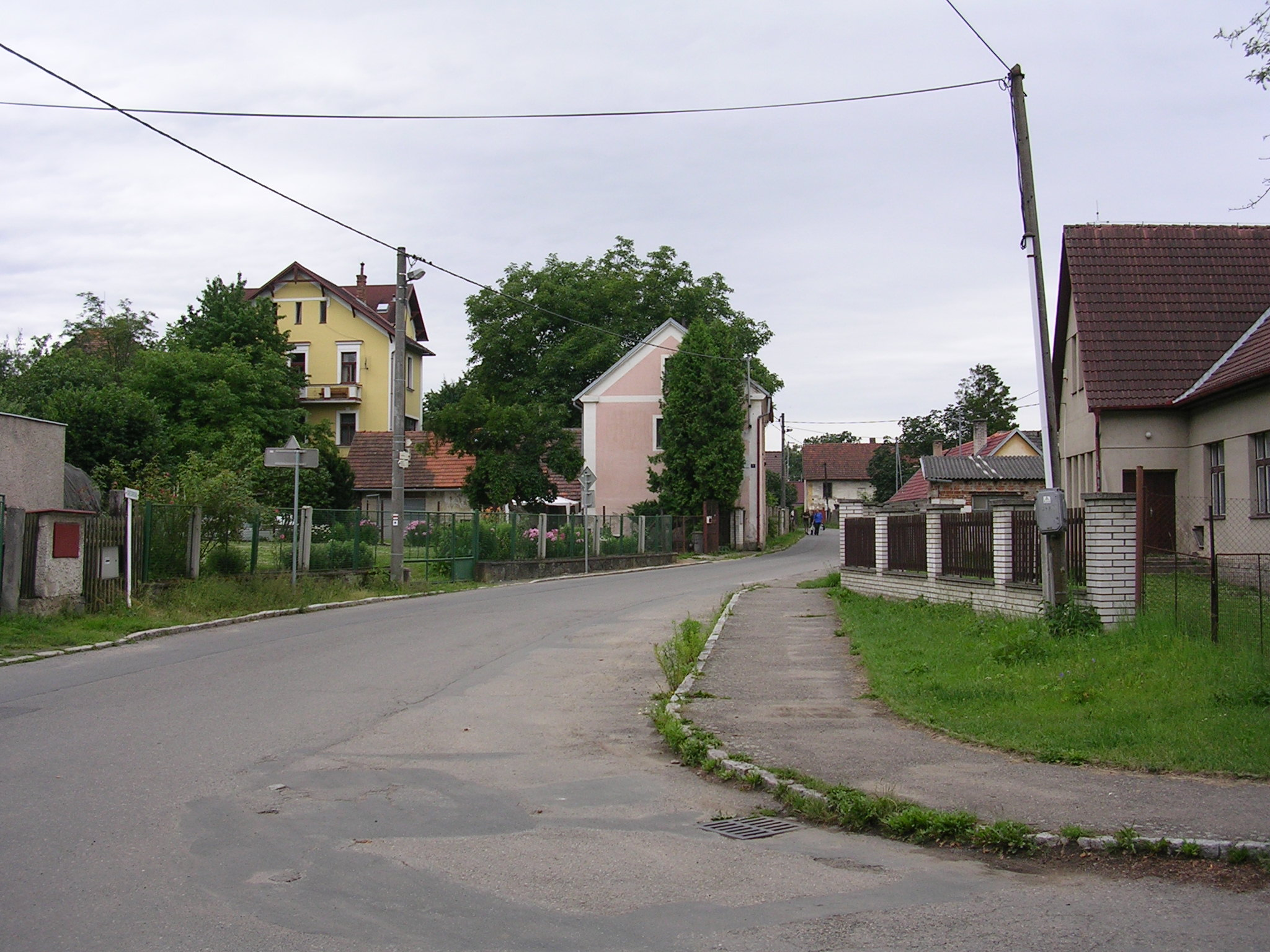
- Main street

- Flag Coat of arms

- Location in the Czech Republic
- Coordinates: 49°51′52″N 14°42′52″E
- Country: Czech Republic
- Region: Central Bohemian
- District: Benešov
- First mentioned: 1398

Area
  - Total: 4.68 km^{2} (1.81 sq mi)
- Elevation: 273 m (896 ft)

Population (2026-01-01)
  - Total: 567
  - Density: 121/km^{2} (314/sq mi)
- Time zone: UTC+1 (CET)
  - Summer (DST): UTC+2 (CEST)
- Postal code: 257 22
- Website: www.lsteni-zlenice.cz

Lštění is a municipality and village in Benešov District in the Central Bohemian Region of the Czech Republic. It has about 600 inhabitants.

== Administrative division ==
Lštění consists of two municipal parts (in brackets population according to the 2021 census):

- Lštění (248)
- Zlenice (233)

== Etymology ==
The initial name of the village vas Lštěň. The name was derived from the personal name Lštěn, meaning "Lštěn's (court, castle)".

== Geography ==
Lštění is located about 9 kilometres (6 mi) north of Benešov and 25 km (16 mi) southeast of Prague. It lies in the Benešov Uplands. The highest point is at 411 m (1,348 ft) above sea level. The municipality is situated on the left bank of the Sázava River.

== History ==
In the first half of the 9th century, a gord was built on a promontory above the present-day village of Lštění. In the 11th century, it became an administrative centre of the Přemyslid dynasty, documented in 1055 in Chronica Boemorum. Sometime during this period, the Church of Saint Clement was established here. The gord probably disappeared at the beginning of the 13th century.

The first written mention of Lštění is from 1398. Lštění reached its greatest prosperity in the 16th century, when it was promoted to a market town.

== Demographics ==
Historical population

Year	Pop.	±%
1869	198	—
1880	163	−17.7%
1890	179	+9.8%
1900	222	+24.0%
1910	209	−5.9%

Year	Pop.	±%
1921	168	−19.6%
1930	259	+54.2%
1950	289	+11.6%
1961	539	+86.5%
1970	455	−15.6%

Year	Pop.	±%
1980	364	−20.0%
1991	283	−22.3%
2001	293	+3.5%
2011	408	+39.2%
2021	481	+17.9%

Source: Censuses

== Transport ==
Lštění is located on the railway line Čerčany–Zruč nad Sázavou. The municipality is served by two train stops: Lštění and Zlenice.

== Sights ==
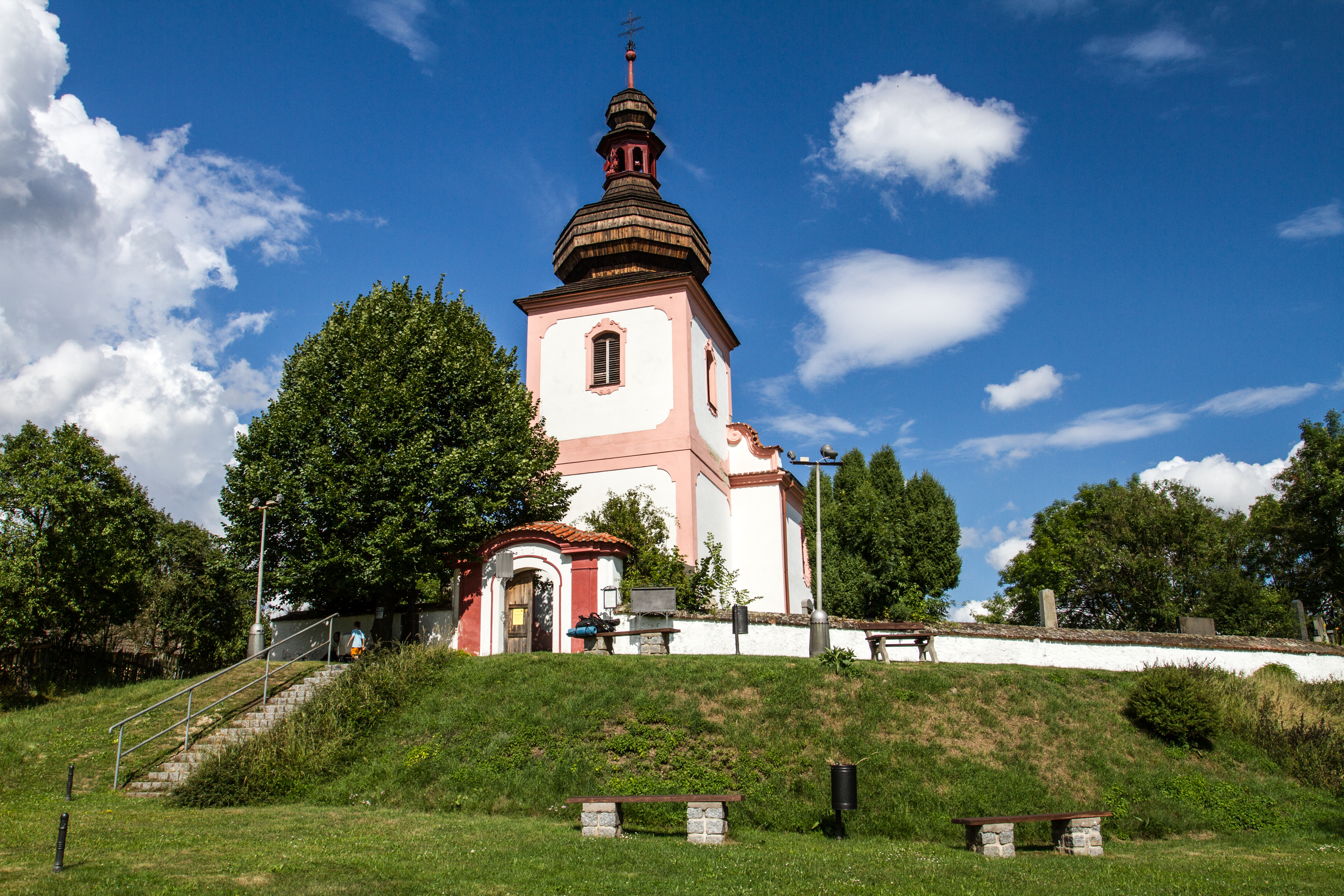
Church of Saint Clement

The main landmark of the municipality is the Church of Saint Clement and the remains of Lštění Gord. The church was built in the Baroque style in 1703, but it has a Gothic core and Romanesque foundations from its predecessor. Only landscaping has survived from the large gord and today the place is an archaeological site.
