= Adolf Dauthage =

Austrian artist (1825–1883)

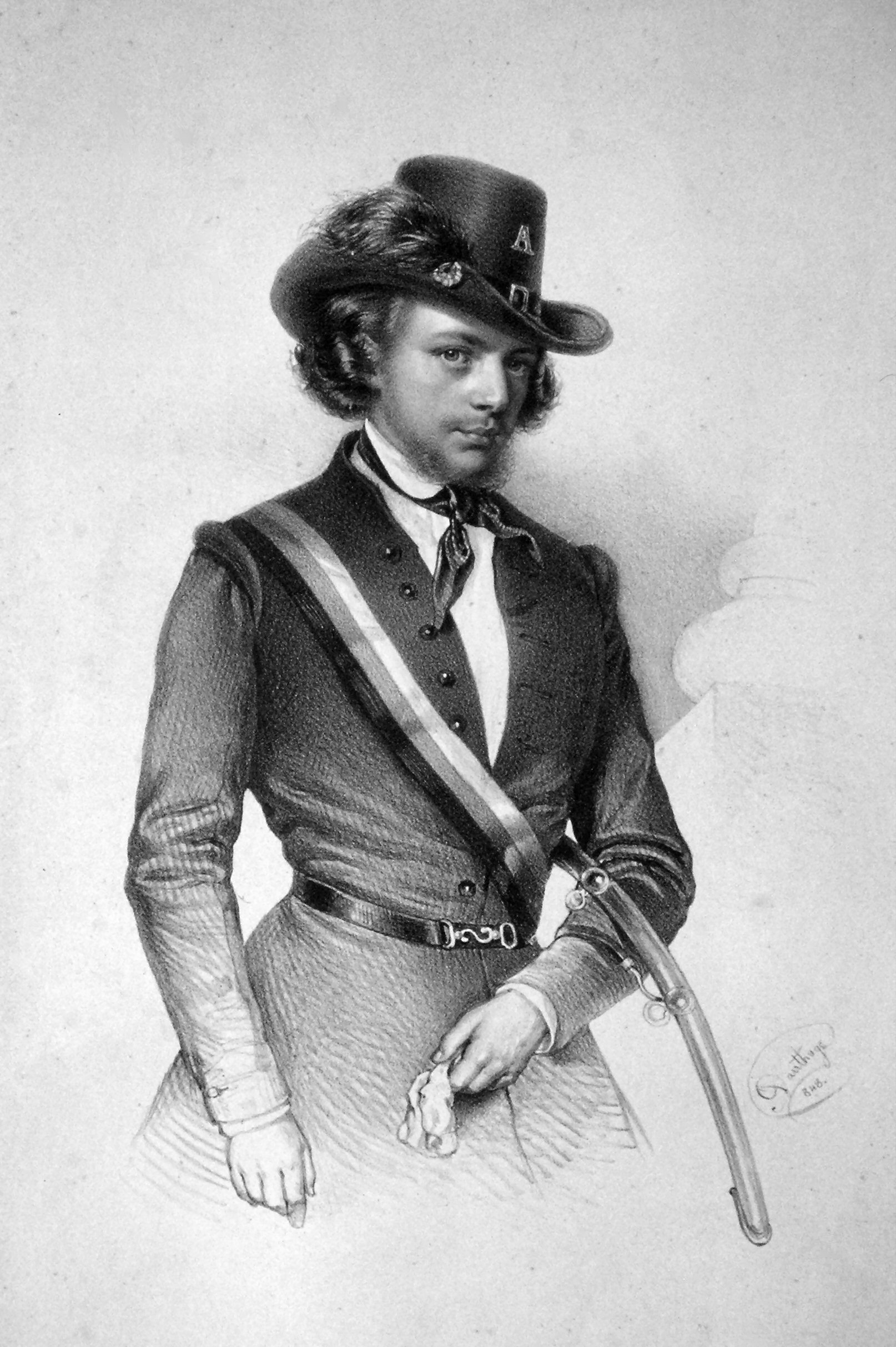
- Self-portrait, 1848
- Born: 20 February 1825; Vienna, Austrian Empire
- Died: 3 June 1883 (aged 58); Vienna, Austria-Hungary

Adolf Dauthage (20 February 1825 – 3 June 1883) was an Austrian lithographer who produced many portrait lithographs. After a period of study at the Vienna Academy, he worked in the studio of Josef Kriehuber for four years.
