= Karel Sabina =

Czech writer and journalist (1813–1877)

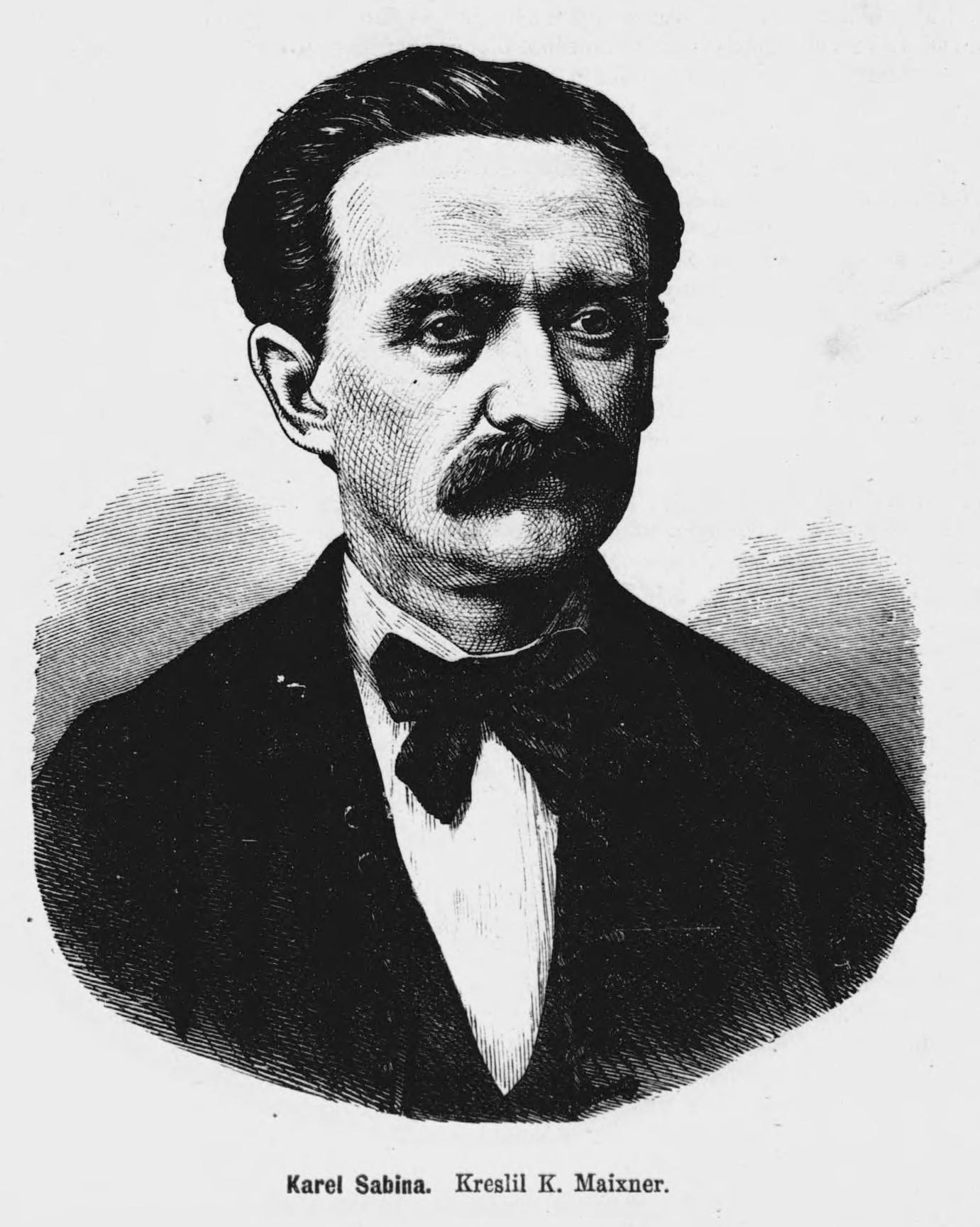
Karel Sabina (1871)

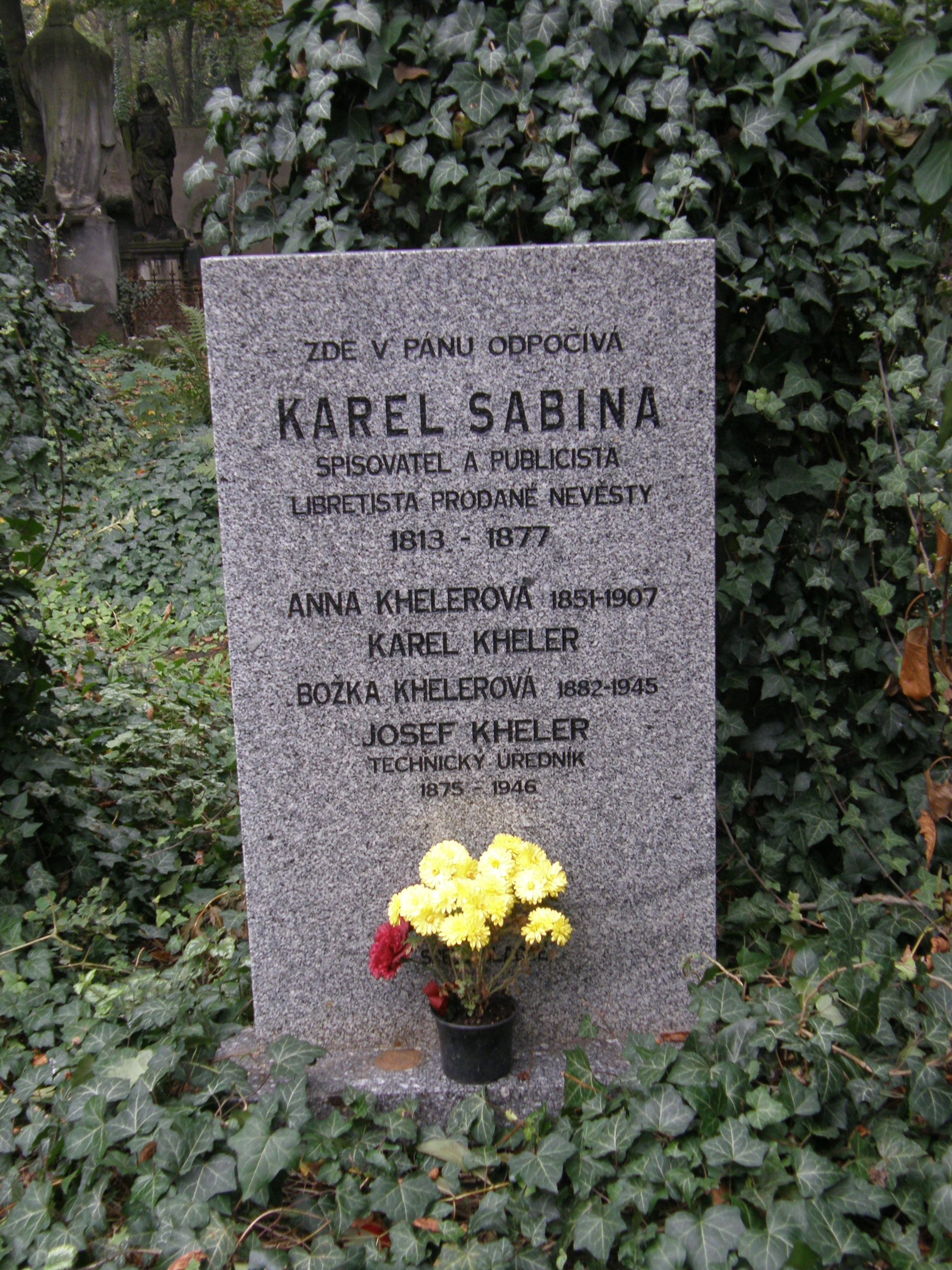
Tomb of Karel Sabina on Olšany Cemetery in Prague

Karel Sabina (pen names include Arian Želinský and Leo Blass; 29 December 1813 – 8 November 1877) was a Czech writer and journalist.

== Life ==
Karel Sabina grew up in poverty as an extramarital child of a daughter of a sugar producing factory's director in the family of a bricklayer and a washerwoman. Sabina later claimed that he was an illegitimate son of a Polish noble. He studied philosophy and law, but did not graduate. In 1848, Sabina became one of the leaders of the Czech radical democrats, the founder of a secret radical political circle "Repeal" (the name inspired by Irish revolutionaries), a member of the National Committee and the Czech congress. Sabina published many articles (several of which were censored) to magazines during this period.

== Imprisonment ==
In 1849, he was arrested for taking part in the "May Coup" (a plan to make an uprising, inspired by Bakunin, then present in Prague) and in 1851 sentenced to death together with 24 other men; but these sentences were changed by Emperor Franz Joseph I to 18 years in the Olomouc prison; in 1857 he was released, following the Emperor's general amnesty of May 8. He came back to Prague and lived as a freelance writer.

== Allegations of betrayal ==
In 1870, the newspaper Vaterland accused Sabina of being a police informant. Sabina successfully sued the newspaper for a libel. In 1872, in an unofficial trial by a self-appointed jury of eight Czech intellectuals (including Jan Neruda and Vítězslav Hálek), Karel Sabina was found guilty of being an informant. Sabina, unable to find exile abroad, was forced to live in hiding in Prague. For the rest of his life, Karel Sabina denied the accusations. The reasons of Sabina's alleged cooperation with the police are not quite clear; if it happened, it might have been a combination of disillusion with the failed revolution which resulted in his long imprisonment, constant police pressure afterwards and his extreme poverty. Being an outcast - his books were no longer sold, on posters (such as the one for the Prodaná nevěsta – whose libretto was seen by some people as Sabina's refutation of the accusations until Miroslav Ivanov's investigation in 1971 published in Ivanov's book Labyrint proved them incorrect) his name was replaced by his initials, and he risked physical attacks whenever he appeared on the streets. However, he continued to write under pen names, some of which are unknown today, thus greatly complicating the historians' effort to make Sabina's bibliography of articles complete.

== Death ==
Sabina died in poverty and scorn on 8 November 1877, aged 63. General exhaustion was given as the cause of death.

== Selected works ==
As a journalist, he wrote mainly for Květy, Moravský Týdenník, Humorist, Lípa, Pražské noviny and Wčela (he was an editor in the last two, replacing Karel Havlíček Borovský in both of them).

=== Novels ===
- Hrobník (1837), Sexton
- Blouznění (1857), Rapture
- Hedvika (1858), Hedwig
- Jen tři léta! (1860), Three years only!
- Na poušti (1863), In the desert
- Oživené hroby (1870), Enlivened Graves, inspired by his imprisonment, his best novel
- Morana čili Svět a jeho nicoty (1874), Morana or The World and its Nothingnesses

=== Plays ===
- Černá růže, The Black Rose
- Inzerát, Advertisement
- Šašek Jiřího z Poděbrad, Jester of George of Poděbrady
- Maloměstské klepny, Smalltown Gossipmongers

=== Tales ===
- Obrazy ze 14. a 15. věku (1844), Tales from the 14th and the 15th century
- Povídky, pověsti, obrazy a novely (1845), Stories, legends, tales and novellas

=== Librettos ===
- Prodaná nevěsta, by Bedřich Smetana
- Braniboři v Čechách, by Bedřich Smetana
- Starý ženich, by Karel Bendl
- V studni, by Vilém Blodek

=== Others ===
- Básně (1841), Poems
- Úvod povahopisný (1845), Introduction to a temperament – the first study on Karel Hynek Mácha, who was Sabina's friend. This book recognised and illustrated Mácha's importance and genius.
- Duchovní komunismus (1861), Spiritual Communism – about everyone's right for education
- Dějiny literatury československé, The History of the Czechoslovak Literature

== Sabina in popular culture ==
Karel Sabina is mentioned in several poems in prose by Ivan Wernisch.
