= Miroslav Ivanov (writer) =

Czech writer

Miroslav Ivanov (1929 in Josefov nad Metují – 1999 in Prague) was a popular Czech nonfiction writer.

His father was executed during Nazi occupation of Czechoslovakia. Ivanov studied history and Czech language at the Charles University in Prague. He then worked at the university for seven years. In 1960 he started work as a journalist and then began to publish books. He concentrated on the medieval and modern history of Czech people and published 37 works (1.5 million copies printed). He was also known outside Czechoslovakia.

In his books he used a very systemic approach of fact gathering and employed modern scientific verification technology: for example he was the first one to test Rukopis královédvorský a zelenohorský (fake collection of ancient writings) using modern forgery detection methods.
