= 1907 Cisleithanian legislative election =

Austro-Hungarian election in Austria

- 14 & 23 May 1907

All 516 seats in the Imperial Council 259 seats needed for a majority
- Turnout: 4,676,350 (84.60%)
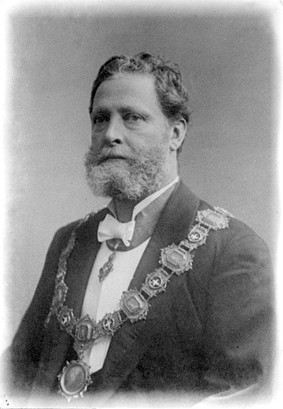

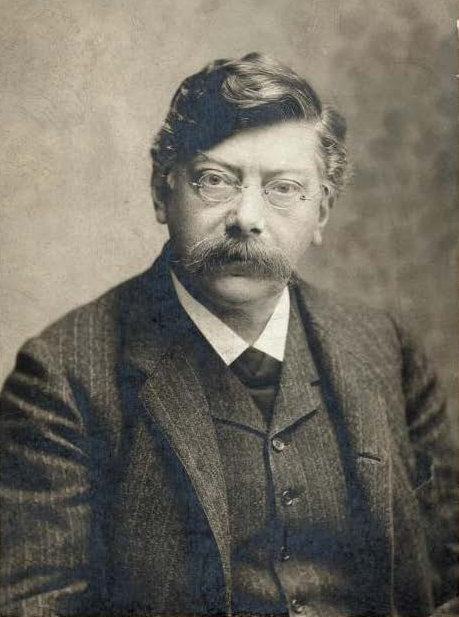

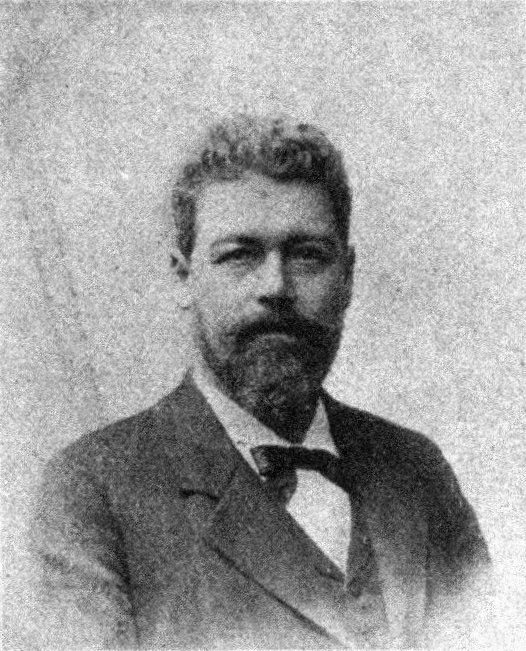

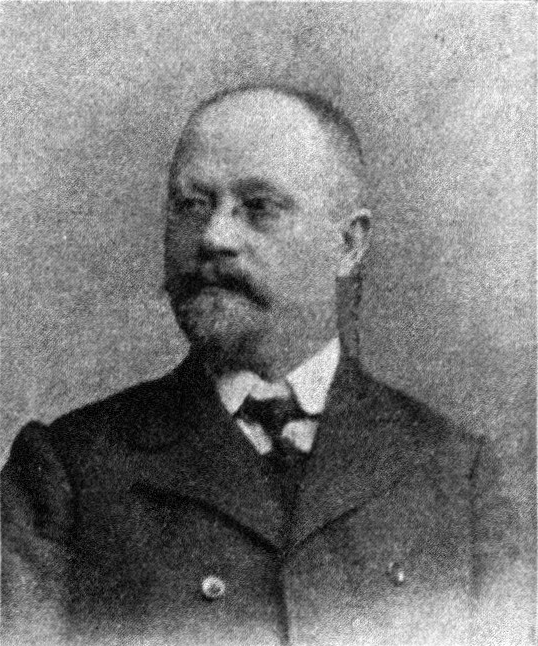
	First party	Second party	Third party
Leader	Karl Lueger	Victor Adler
Party	CS	SDAP	DKP
Alliance	Christian Social Union	Club of German Social Democrats	Christian Social Union
Last election	25 seats, 27.45%	12 seats, 23.39%	28 seats, 0.80%
Seats won	65	50	31
Seat change	▲40	▲38	▲3
Popular vote	542,505	513,219	193,753
Percentage	11.73%	11.12%	4.20%
Swing	▼15.72pp	▼12.27pp	▲3.40pp
	Fourth party	Fifth party	Sixth party
Leader	Karl von Chiari	Josef Žďárský	Antonín Němec
Party	DVP	RSZML	ČSSD
Alliance	German National Association	Club of Bohemian Agrarians	Club of Bohemian Social Democrats
Last election	51 seats, 6.56%	2 seats, 0.09%	Stood With SDAP
Seats won	29	27	23
Seat change	▼22	▲25	New
Popular vote	131,474	206,784	389,960
Percentage	2.85%	4.48%	8.45%
Swing	▼3.71pp	▲4.39pp	▲8.45pp
Minister-President of Cisleithania before election
Max Wladimir von Beck
Independent
Elected Minister-President of Cisleithania
Max Wladimir von Beck
Independent

Legislative elections were held in Cisleithania, the northern and western ("Austrian") crown lands of Austria-Hungary, on 14 and 23 May 1907 to elect the members of the 11th Imperial Council. They were the first elections held under universal male suffrage, after an electoral reform abolishing tax paying requirements for voters had been adopted by the council and was endorsed by Emperor Franz Joseph earlier in the year. However, seat allocations were based on tax revenues from the States.

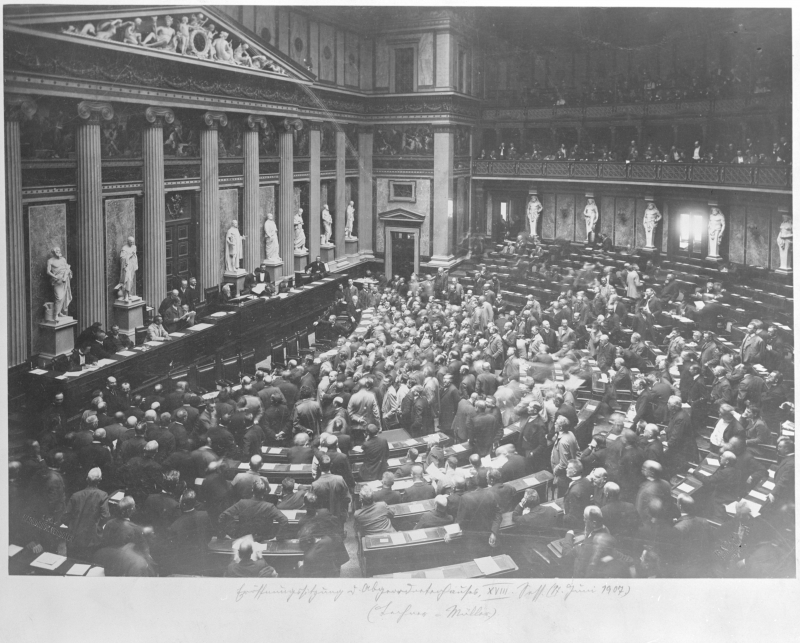
Opening session of the House of Deputies, 17 June 1907

== Electoral system ==
Under the shadow of the Russian Revolution of 1905 and large-scale demonstrations organized by the Social Democrats, the emperor to placate the public had a reform of the former five-class suffrage system, drafted by Minister-President Paul Gautsch von Frankenthurn. His successor, Baron Max Wladimir von Beck, pushed it through against fierce resistance from the Austrian House of Lords and the heir to the throne, Archduke Franz Ferdinand.

Elections in the constituencies of "the Kingdoms and Lands represented in the Imperial Council" were held according to a two-round system. If no candidate received the required absolute majority on May 14, only the two candidates receiving the most votes survived to the second round. on May 23. The 516 representatives of the constituent crown lands were thus elected, 130 from Bohemia, 106 from Galicia, 64 from Lower Austria and 49 from Moravia. The numerous political associations were again split according to ethnicity ("nations"), with a result that no government could ever rely on a stable majority.

== Results ==
The right-wing Christian Social Party emerged as the largest bloc in Parliament, holding 95 of the 516 seats, followed by the Social Democratic Workers' Party of Austria with 50 seats. The former won most rural constituencies in Upper and Lower Austria, Styria, Salzburg, Tyrol, and Vorarlberg. It also achieved the majority in the capital, Vienna, benefiting from the popularity of the Christian Social mayor, Karl Lueger. In the German constituencies of Bohemia and Moravia and in Carinthia, the German national parties (German People's Party etc.) did well. The Social Democrats had their strongholds in the cities other than Vienna: Graz, Salzburg, Innsbruck, Brno and Linz.

Voter turnout was 84.6%.

Party	Votes	%	Seats	+/–
Croatian Nation
Croatian National Party	23,482	0.51	2	–4
Party of Rights	16,013	0.35	2	–1
People's Party (Anti-Resolutionist)	15,683	0.34	2	New
People's Party (Resolutionist)	15,283	0.33	4	New
Croatian Independents	6,373	0.14	1	New
People's Party (Democratic)	4,441	0.10	0	New
Croatian and Slovenian Nation
Slavic Social Democratic Party	10,518	0.23	1	New
Czech Nation
Social Democratic Party	389,960	8.45	23	New
Czech Agrarian Party	206,784	4.48	27	+25
Catholic-National Conservative Parties in Bohemia and Moravia	182,500	3.95	10	New
Christian Social Party in Bohemia and Moravia	182,500	3.95	7	+5
Young Czech Party	116,524	2.52	21	–29
Czech National Social Party	75,101	1.63	6	+2
Old Czech Party	32,224	0.70	5	+5
Czech Independents	15,952	0.35	2	+2
Czech Realist Party	14,704	0.32	2	New
Czech Paper Candidates	14,339	0.31	0	New
Czech Radical Progressive Party	9,899	0.21	2	+2
Czech National Party	9,828	0.21	1	–1
Czech Progressive Constitutionalist Party	7,879	0.17	1	+1
German Nation
Christian Social Party	542,505	11.75	65	+40
Social Democratic Party	513,219	11.11	50	+38
German Conservative Party	193,753	4.20	31	+3
Agrarian Party	132,978	2.88	19	+16
German People's Party	131,474	2.85	29	–22
German Progressive Party	103,315	2.24	19	–15
Free German Party	70,564	1.53	13	New
Pan-German Association	20,693	0.45	2	New
Upper Austrian Farmers' Club	15,283	0.33	0	New
German-National Party	10,457	0.23	0	–22
Officials' Party	5,701	0.12	0	New
Free Socialists	5,289	0.11	1	New
German Conservative Farmers' Party	4,947	0.11	0	0
Independent German Radicals	4,569	0.10	2	New
Independent Pan-Germans	3,659	0.08	0	New
German Workers' Party	3,486	0.08	0	New
German-Christian Party	3,286	0.07	0	New
German Independents	2,806	0.06	0	0
Social Politicians	2,386	0.05	1	0
Tiroler Volksbund	1,113	0.02	0	New
Radical Party	785	0.02	0	New
Central Industrial Committee	150	0.00	0	New
Italian Nation
Trentino People's Party	40,943	0.89	7	New
Italian National-Liberal Party	27,723	0.60	3	–9
Italian Social Democratic Party	19,918	0.43	5	New
Italian-National Party	9,673	0.21	1	–1
Italian Clerical Party	9,599	0.21	2	+2
Italian Christian Social Party	8,977	0.19	1	New
Italian Independents	4,008	0.09	0	New
Italian Liberal Farmers' Association	1,065	0.02	0	New
Jewish Candidates
Jewish National Party	31,941	0.69	4	New
Polish Nation
Polish People's Party	165,980	3.59	16	+12
Polish Conservative Party	131,540	2.85	15	–39
Polish Centre Party	108,247	2.34	14	New
Polish National Democratic Party	104,544	2.26	14	+11
Polish Social Democratic Party	65,057	1.41	6	New
Polish Democratic Party	45,942	0.99	11	+5
Polish Christian Social Party	11,210	0.24	1	0
Independent Socialists	8,022	0.17	1	New
Polish Agrarian Party	4,971	0.11	0	0
Polish National Party	3,675	0.08	0	–1
Polish Progressive Democratic Party	1,684	0.04	1	0
Romanian Nation
Romanian National (Defense) Party	31,674	0.69	3	–2
Romanian National (Democratic) Party	15,195	0.33	1	New
Romanian Independents	4,655	0.10	1	New
Romanian Social Democratic Party	823	0.02	0	New
Ruthenian Nation
Ukrainian National Democratic Party–Young Ruthenian Party	304,410	6.59	20	+19
Russian National Party	162,663	3.52	5	+2
Ukrainian Radical Party	105,118	2.28	5	+3
Ukrainian Social Democratic Party	27,978	0.61	2	New
Serbian Nation
Serb People's Party	7,808	0.17	2	0
Serbian Independents	3,975	0.09	0	New
Slovenian Nation
Slovene Clerical Party	48,431	1.05	8	–3
Slovene People's Party	48,175	1.04	10	New
Slovene Liberal Party	23,292	0.50	3	–2
Slovenian National Party	16,830	0.36	2	+2
Slovene Social Democratic Party	13,189	0.29	0	New
Slovenian National-Progressive Party	10,921	0.24	1	New
Slovenian Pro-German Party	6,001	0.13	0	0
Slovenian Agrarian Party	1,309	0.03	0	0
Slovenian Independents	873	0.02	0	New
Unknown or split
Unknown or split votes	39,416	0.85	–	–
Total	4,617,360	100.00	516	+91
Valid votes	4,617,360	98.74		
Invalid/blank votes	58,990	1.26		
Total votes	4,676,350	100.00		
Registered voters/turnout	5,526,203	84.62		
Source: ANNO

=== By parliamentary grouping ===
Party	Seats	+/–
Christian Social Union	96	+71
Poland Club	55	–10
German National Association	51	New
Club of German Social Democrats	50	+39
Club of Bohemian Agrarians	30	+24
Bohemian Club	25	–19
Ruthenian Club	25	+17
Club of Bohemian Social Democrats	24	New
Association of Yugoslavians	20	–5
Catholic-National Party	17	New
Slovenian Club	17	New
Polish People's Party	16	+11
German Progressive Union	15	–12
German Radical Group	13	New
Bohemian National Social Club	11	New
Italian People's Party	10	New
Club of Polish Social Democrats	6	New
Group of Italian Social Democrats	5	New
Romanian Club	5	Steady
Club of Liberal Italians	4	New
Jewish Club	4	New
Pan-German Group	3	–5
Representation of Ruthenian-Ukrainian Social Democrats	2	New
Independents	12	–20
Total	516	+91
Source: ANNO

== See also ==
- List of political parties in Austria
- 1907 Cisleithanian legislative election in the Czech lands
- 1907 Cisleithanian legislative election in the Kingdom of Dalmatia
- 1907 Cisleithanian legislative election in the Margraviate of Istria
