= Orel (movement) =

Czech gymnastics organization

Coordinates: 49°11′35″N 16°36′13″E

- Founded: 1909
- Founder: Jan Šrámek
- Type: Christian sport organization
- Headquarters: Pelicova 2, Brno
- Website: http://www.orel.cz

The Orel ("eagle" in Czech) is a Moravia-based Czech youth movement and gymnastics organization which emerged between 1896 and 1909 as Catholic Church-supported competitor of another Czech sport movement Sokol (founded 1862), oriented more nationalistic and rather anti-Catholic. Orel movement, defining itself as "Christian sport organization", still exists and currently has about 19,000 members. Since 1921 is member of international sport association FICEP. Party always cooperated in close with Moravian-Silesian Christian Social Party and later with the Czechoslovak People's Party.

A similar organization with the same name was organized also in the Slovene Lands and in Croatia, where it successfully competed with the local Sokol movement. It was dissolved in the early 1930s by the following dictatorship in the Kingdom of Yugoslavia.

== See also ==
- Bežigrad Stadium
- Strahov Stadium

== Gallery ==
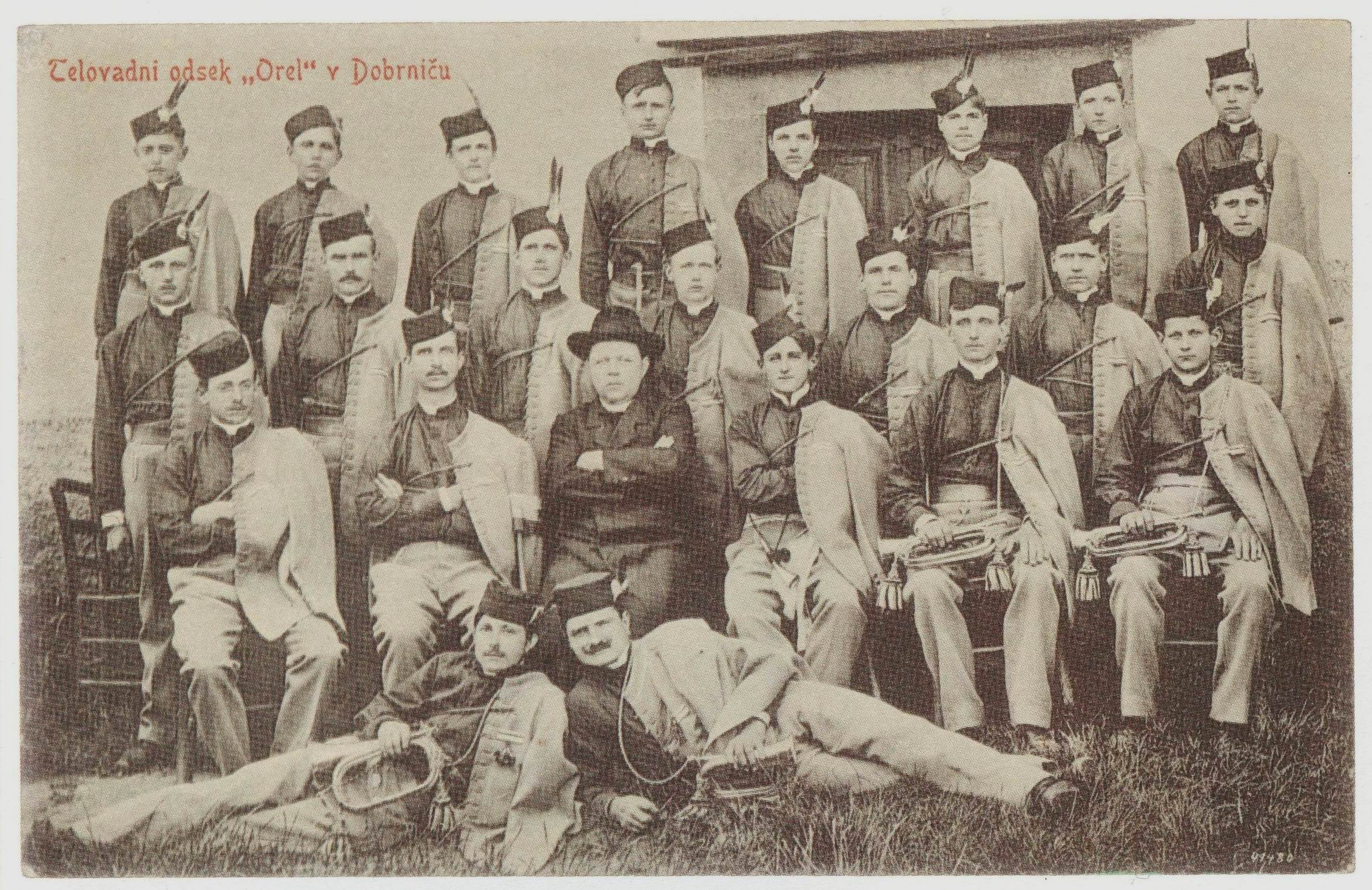
A group of Slovenian Orel members in Lower Carniola

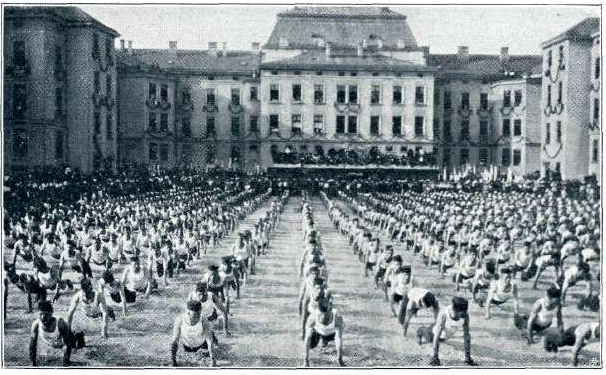
Slovenian-Croatian Catholic Orel gathering in Ljubljana 1913

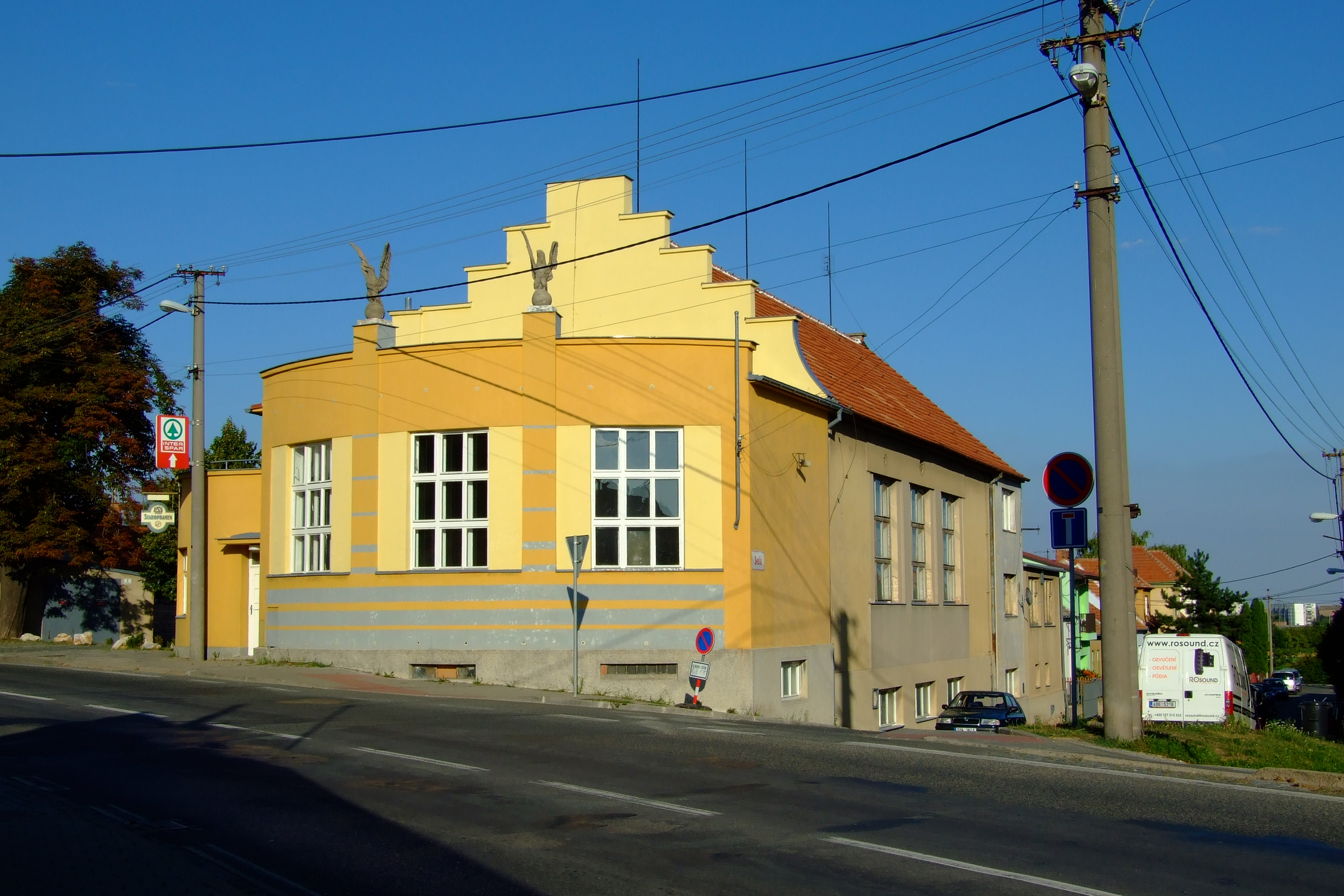
Orel house in Brno, Czech Republic

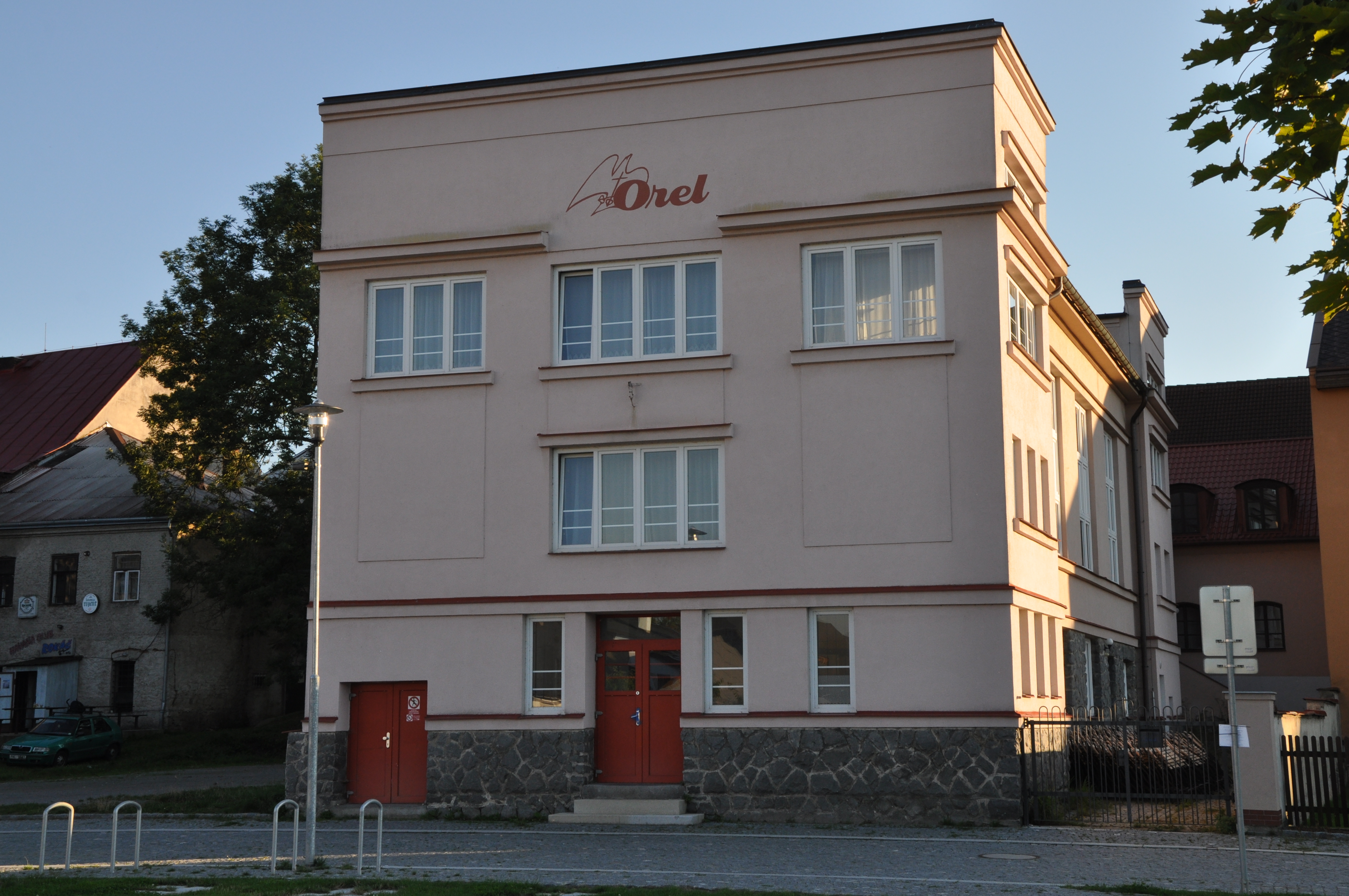
Orel house in Hlinsko, Czech Republic
