= 1907 Cisleithanian legislative election in the Czech lands =

- May 1907

194 of the 516 seats in the Imperial Council
- Turnout: 1,709,898 (84.44%)
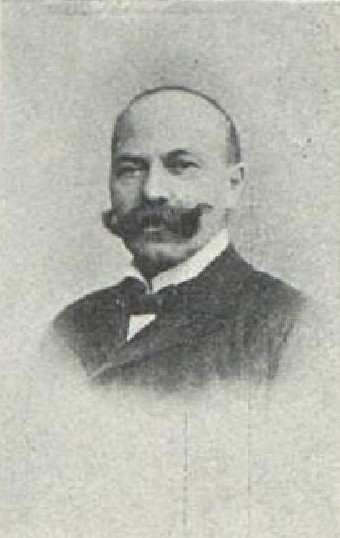

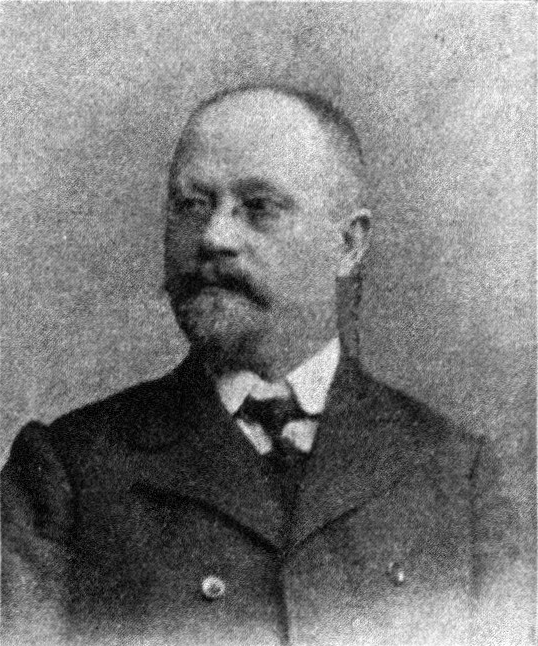

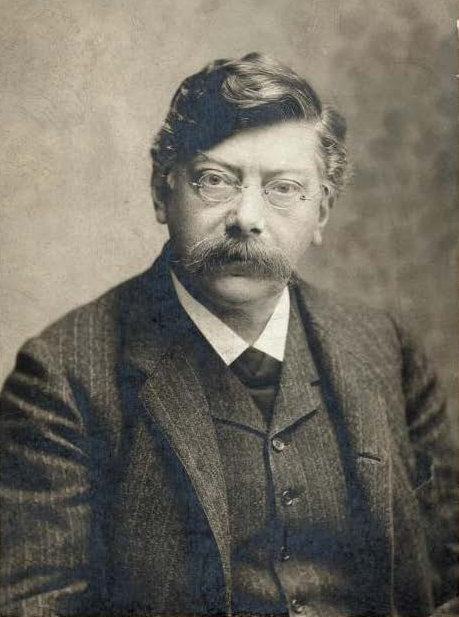

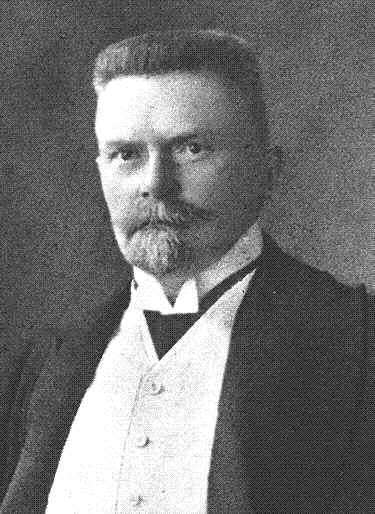
	First party	Second party	Third party
Leader	Josef Žďárský	Antonín Němec	Victor Adler
Party	RSZML	ČSSD	SDAP
Alliance	Club of Bohemian Agrarians	Club of Bohemian Social Democrats	Club of German Social Democrats
Leader since	1904	1904	1889
Leader's seat	Bohemian Diet	Bohemia	Lower Austria
Last election	2 seats	1 seat	3 seats
Seats won	27	23	21
Seat change	▲25	▲22	▲18
Popular vote	245,210	377,129	233,205
Percentage	14.51%	22.32%	13.80%
	Fourth party	Fifth party	Sixth party
Leader	Franz Peschka	Karl Eppinger	Karel Kramář
Party	DAP	DFP	Young Czech
Alliance	German National Association	German National Association	Bohemian Club
Leader since	1905		1897
Leader's seat	Bohemian Diet	Bohemian Diet	Bohemia
Last election	3 seats	22 seats	40 seats
Seats won	17	16	15
Seat change	▲14	▼6	▼25
Popular vote	112,375	70,648	71,264
Percentage	6.65%	4.18%	4.22%

Legislative elections to elect members of the Cisleithanian Imperial Council were held in the Czech lands over several days in May 1907. The Czech lands (Kingdom of Bohemia, Margraviate of Moravia and the Duchy of Upper and Lower Silesia) elected 194 out of the 516 seats in the Imperial Council.

These elections were the first which were held under universal male suffrage, after an electoral reform abolishing tax paying requirements for voters had been adopted by the council and was endorsed by Emperor Franz Joseph earlier in the year. The elections meant huge gains for the social democratic and agrarian parties while the national liberal parties lost ground.

== Results ==
Party	Votes	%	Seats	+/–
Czech Nation
Czechoslavonic Social Democratic Workers' Party	377,129	22.18	23	+22
Czechoslavonic Agrarian Party	245,210	14.42	27	+25
Catholic-National and Christian Social Parties in Moravia	98,772	5.81	10	+8
National Liberal Party	71,264	4.19	15	-25
Czech National Social Party	65,768	3.87	6	+5
Party of Catholic People	55,264	3.25	7	+7
People's Party in Moravia	39,184	2.30	6	-4
Moravian National Party	24,682	1.45	3	+3
Czech Independents	14,779	0.87	2	+2
Czech Radical Progressive Party	11,895	0.70	2	+2
National Party in Silesia	10,849	0.64	1	+1
Czech Progressive Party	8,366	0.49	2	+2
National Party	6,940	0.41	2	+2
Czech Constitutionalist Radical Party	3,424	0.20	1	+1
Paper candidates	2,665	0.16	0	0
Moravian Progressive Party	1,338	0.08	0	0
German Nation
Social Democratic Worker's Party of Austria	233,205	13.72	21	+18
German Agrarian Party	112,375	6.61	17	+14
Free Pan-German Party	71,170	4.19	13	+13
German Progressive Party	70,648	4.15	16	-6
German People's Party	61,734	3.63	12	-1
Christian Social Party	44,675	2.63	1	+1
Free Socialists	17,646	1.04	2	+2
Pan-German Unification	11,245	0.66	2	-18
Independent Pan-German	3,659	0.22	0	0
German Independents	2,178	0.13	0	0
German National Workers' Party	1,556	0.09	0	0
German Traders' Party	83	0.00	0	0
Polish Nation
Polish Social Democratic Party	15,536	0.91	2	+1
Polish Christian Social Party	12,046	0.71	1	+1
Polish Agrarian Party	4,103	0.24	0	0
Polish National Party	932	0.05	0	-1
Total	1,700,320	100.00	194	+29
Valid votes	1,700,320	98.84		
Invalid/blank votes	19,957	1.16		
Total votes	1,720,277	100.00		
Registered voters/turnout	2,024,990	84.95		
Source: ANNO

Vote share
Czech Social Democrats	22.3%
Czech Agrarians	14.5%
German Social Democrats	13.8%
German Agrarians	6.7%
Moravian Catholic parties	5.8%
Ýoung Czechs	4.2%
Free Pan-Germans	4.2%
German Progressives	4.2%
Czech National Socials	3.9%
German Populars	3.7%
Bohemian Catholic Party	3.3%
Others	12.5%

=== Results for Bohemia ===
Party	Votes	%	Seats	+/–
Czech Nation
Czechoslavonic Social Democratic Workers' Party	269,169	24.15	17	+17
Czechoslavonic Agrarian Party	190,198	17.06	23	+21
National Liberal Party	71,264	6.39	15	-25
Czech National Social Party	65,501	5.88	6	+5
Party of Catholic People	55,264	4.96	7	+7
Czech Radical Progressive Party	11,895	1.07	2	+2
National Party	6,940	0.62	2	+2
Czech Independents	6,627	0.59	1	+1
Czech Progressive Party	4,230	0.38	1	+1
Czech Constitutionalist Radical Party	3,424	0.31	1	+1
Paper candidates	2,665	0.24	0	0
German Nation
Social Democratic Worker's Party of Austria	169,741	15.23	16	+15
German Agrarian Party	106,331	9.54	16	+13
Free Pan-German Party	57,790	5.18	11	+11
German Progressive Party	31,251	2.80	6	-7
Christian Social Party	18,546	1.66	0	0
German People's Party	18,055	1.62	3	0
Pan-German Unification	11,245	1.01	2	-18
Free Socialists	7,267	0.65	1	+1
Independent Pan-German	3,659	0.33	0	0
German Independents	2,178	0.20	0	0
German National Workers' Party	1,556	0.14	0	0
Total	1,114,796	100.00	130	+20
Valid votes	1,114,796	99.07		
Invalid/blank votes	10,481	0.93		
Total votes	1,125,277	100.00		
Registered voters/turnout	1,375,825	81.79		
Source: ANNO

=== Results for Moravia ===
Party	Votes	%	Seats	+/–
Czech Nation
Catholic-National and Christian Social Parties in Moravia	98,772	21.22	10	+8
Czechoslavonic Social Democratic Workers' Party	97,709	20.99	5	+1
Czechoslavonic Agrarian Party	54,945	11.80	4	+4
People's Party in Moravia	39,184	8.42	6	-4
Moravian National Party	24,682	5.30	3	+3
Czech Independents	8,152	1.75	1	+1
Czech Progressive Party	2,360	0.51	1	+1
Moravian Progressive Party	1,338	0.29	0	0
Czech National Social Party	267	0.06	0	0
German Nation
Social Democratic Worker's Party of Austria	41,515	8.92	3	+2
German Progressive Party	32,361	6.95	8	-1
German People's Party	30,470	6.55	6	-1
Christian Social Party	23,445	5.04	1	+1
Free Pan-German Party	10,188	2.19	1	+1
German Traders' Party	83	0.02	0	0
Total	465,471	100.00	49	+6
Valid votes	465,471	98.19		
Invalid/blank votes	8,558	1.81		
Total votes	474,029	100.00		
Registered voters/turnout	522,497	90.72		
Source: ANNO

== See also ==
- 1907 Cisleithanian legislative election
