= National Conservative Party =

National Conservative Party is the name of several political parties:

- National Conservative Party of South Africa
- National Conservative Party (South Africa) (1954–1957)
- National Conservative Party (Cuba)
- Latvian National Independence Movement (1988–1990s)

== See also ==
- Catholic-National Conservative Party in Bohemia (1911–1919)
- Catholic-National Conservative Party in Moravia (1896–1919)
- National Liberal and Conservative Party, the name adopted by the Conservative Party of Canada in 1920
- List of conservative parties
- List of conservative parties by country
