= Conservative People's Party (Bohemia) =

Conservative People's Party Konzervativní strana lidová
- Founded: 1910
- Dissolved: 1919
- Split from: Party of Catholic People
- Merged into: Czechoslovak People's Party
- Ideology: Conservatism; Political Catholicism
- Political position: Centre-right

The Conservative People's Party (Czech: Konzervativní strana lidová) also known as (Czech: Konzervativně lidová strana) was a small Czech Catholic political party in Bohemia. The party was founded in the 1910s after split in the Catholic-National Conservative Party in Bohemia and the Party of the Catholic People. In January 1919 members united under František Šabata and party merged into newly formed Czechoslovak People's Party.
