= Senate district 57 – Vyškov =

Electoral district in the Czech Republic

57 – Vyškov
- inline Senate district of the Czech Republic

- The Vyškov district on a map
- Senator: Jan Grolich; KDU-ČSL
- Region: South Moravia
- District: Vyškov; Brno-Country
- Last election: 2026
- Next election: 2032

Senate district 57 – Vyškov is an electoral district of the Senate of the Czech Republic, located in the western part of the Vyškov District and the eastern part of the Brno-Country District. Since 2026, the Senator for the district is Jan Grolich for KDU-ČSL.

== Senators ==
Year	Senator	Party
1996	Oldřich Dočekal	KDU-ČSL
2002	Ivo Bárek	ČSSD
2008	Ivo Bárek	ČSSD
2014	Ivo Bárek	ČSSD
2020	Karel Zitterbart	STAN
2026	Jan Grolich	KDU-ČSL

== Election results ==
=== 1996 ===
1996 Czech Senate election in Vyškov
Candidate	Party	1st round		2nd round	
Candidate	Party	Votes	%	Votes	%
Oldřich Dočekal	KDU-ČSL	7 765	22,35	15 302	59,19
Karel Slezák	ODS	10 559	30,39	10 552	40,81
Zdeněk Kotrlý	ČSSD	6 852	19,72	—	—
Zdeněk Koudelka	KSČM	5 560	16,00	—	—
Jiří Berka	ODA	2 065	5,94	—	—
Jiří Bílý	MSLK_96	1 156	3,33	—	—
Antonín Hrazdíra	SDS	785	2,26	—	—

=== 2002 ===
2002 Czech Senate election in Vyškov
Candidate	Party	1st round		2nd round	
Candidate	Party	Votes	%	Votes	%
Ivo Bárek	ČSSD	5 876	22,29	17 524	51,60
František Adamec	KDU-ČSL	7 816	29,65	16 434	48,39
Zdeněk Koudelka	KSČM	4 771	18,10	—	—
František Pejřil	ODS	4 576	17,36	—	—
František Kopecký	SNK	2 032	7,70	—	—
Ignác Hoza	ODA	1 288	4,88	—	—

=== 2008 ===
2008 Czech Senate election in Vyškov
Candidate	Party	1st round		2nd round	
Candidate	Party	Votes	%	Votes	%
Ivo Bárek	ČSSD	16 558	39,60	20 297	61,09
Václav Horák	KDU-ČSL	9 609	20,98	12 926	38,90
Luboš Kadlec	ODS	6 162	14,73	—	—
Zdeněk Koudelka	KSČM	5 981	14,30	—	—
Anna Šabatová	SZ	2 570	6,14	—	—
Alena Machayová	SNK ED	925	2,21	—	—

=== 2014 ===
2014 Czech Senate election in Vyškov
Candidate	Party	1st round		2nd round	
Candidate	Party	Votes	%	Votes	%
Ivo Bárek	ČSSD	15 155	33,72	11 023	53,22
Roman Celý	KDU-ČSL	10 244	22,79	9 687	46,77
Pavel Zůna	ANO 2011	9 115	20,28	—	—
Zdeněk Šigut	TOP 09, STAN	5 238	11,65	—	—
Zdeněk Koudelka	KSČM	5 181	11,53	—	—

=== 2020 ===
2020 Czech Senate election in Vyškov
Candidate	Party	1st round		2nd round	
Candidate	Party	Votes	%	Votes	%
Karel Zitterbart	STAN	11 727	27,15	8 231	50,08
Jaroslav Klaška	KDU-ČSL, ODS, TOP 09	11 955	27,67	8 204	49,91
Ivo Bárek	ČSSD	9 579	22,17	—	—
Lubomír Wenzl	ANO 2011	6 341	14,68	—	—
Libor Bláha	SPD	3 589	8,30	—	—

=== 2026 ===
2026 Czech Senate election in Vyškov
Candidate	Party	1st round	
Candidate	Party	Votes	%
Jan Grolich	KDU-ČSL	37 071	63,34
Petra Absolonová	ANO 2011	17 553	29,99
Jaroslav Fládr	Přísaha	3 898	6,66
