= Edgar Meyer (painter) =

Austrian painter (1853–1925)

- Born: 1853; Innsbruck, Tyrol, Austria
- Died: 1925 (aged 71–72); Aldrans, Nr Innsbruck, Tyrol, Austria
- Known for: Painter and political activist
- Movement: Impressionist

Edgar Meyer (1853–1925) was an Austrian painter who built himself a castle and engaged in politics.

== Life ==
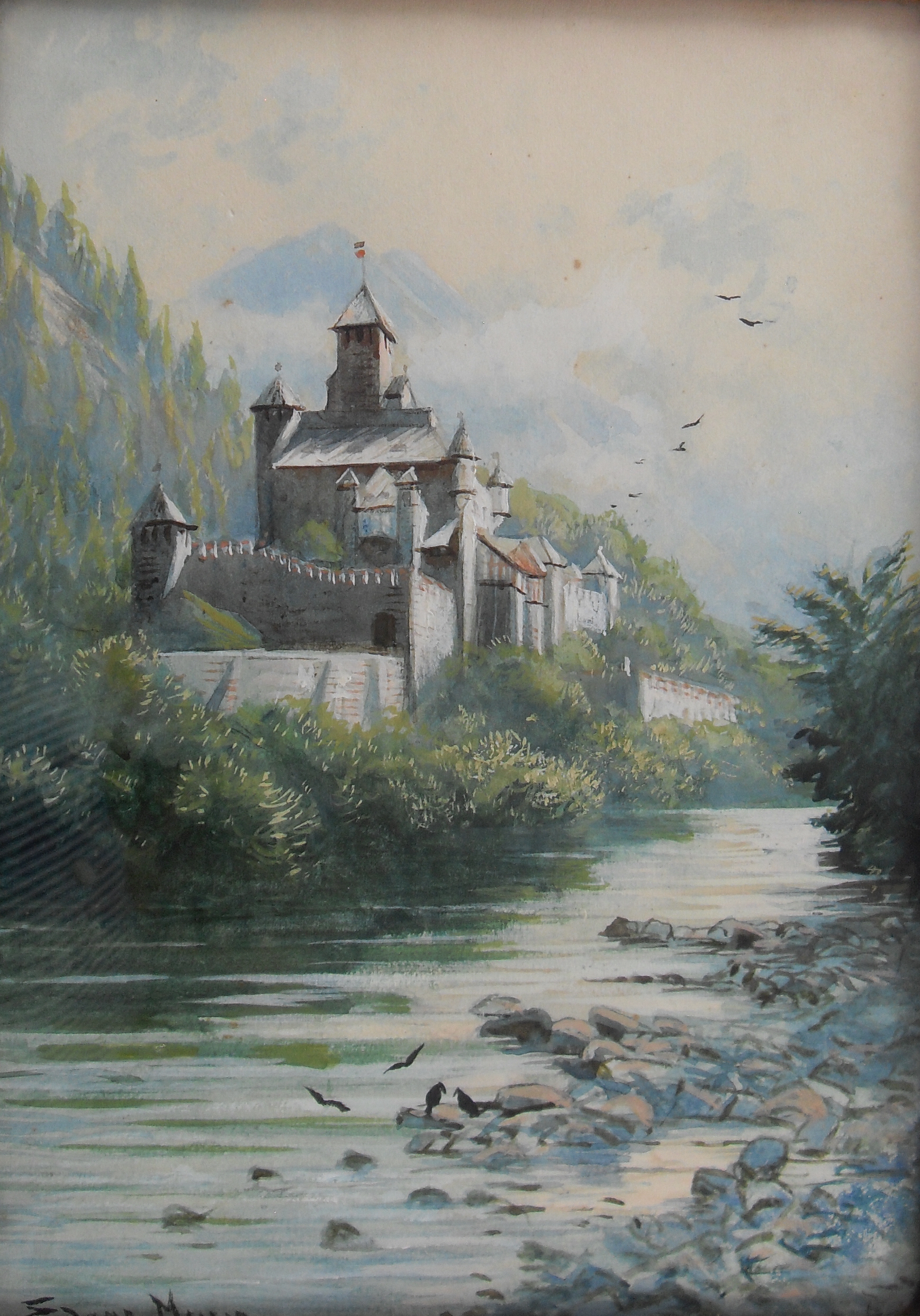
Welfenstein Castle (by Meyer, c. 1905)

Meyer was born on 5 September 1853 in Innsbruck, Tyrol, Austria. His parents were Martin Meyer (1821–1897) (a prosperous businessman, painter, poet and compiler of folksongs) and Theresia Megucher (1826–1905). He studied at the Akademie der Bildenkünste in Munich, and from 1874 to 1877 at the Kunstakademie Düsseldorf under the direction of Eugen Dücker. He extended his studies by visiting Rome and Venice. Between 1880 and 1881, he was a member of an association of artists and academics called Malkasten (In English, Paintbox) in Düsseldorf. He lived in Weimar and was also Professor at Charlottenburg-Berlin.

Meyer's preferred medium was watercolour and his impressionist styled landscapes, mountain scenes and castles were popular, particularly in Germany where they sold well. Meyer's paintings can be found at the Tiroler Landesmuseum (Ferdinandeum), Innsbruck and in private collections around the world. Towards the end of the nineteenth century the progression of Revolutionary Art caused his work to lose favour and he returned to the Tyrol.

He bought the medieval ruins of Welfenstein Castle near Sterzing in South Tyrol. During the period 1893–1897 he rebuilt the castle transforming it into a romantic edifice complete with numerous towers, ramparts and battlements. Meyer furnished the castle with antiques and works of art collected from throughout the Tyrol. In November 1918 a devastating fire burnt down the castle destroying most of its contents including a collection of forty thousand books. In 1910 Meyer co-founded the Tiroler Volkskunst museum (Museum of Tyrolean Folk Art).

He died at Aldrans near Innsbruck on 21 February 1925, aged 71.

== Political life ==
Edgar Meyer was a proponent of the germanisation of Trentino and the corridor beyond leading to the Adriatic Sea. These areas contained a string of German-speaking communities. This was against a backdrop of rising Italian nationalism or irrendentism.

In 1905 Meyer co-founded the Tiroler Volksbund (Tyrolean Popular League). Financed with German money it promoted Austrian culture and German teaching in South Tyrol and Trentino.

In 1907 Meyer was the key player in a notorious episode that became known as "Zweite Schlacht von Calliano* (The Second Battle of Calliano). At the time Austro-German nationalist associations promoted their visions of national identity by organising tours and hiking parties. Meyer had already organised several controversial tours, then in the summer of 1907 he led a hiking party of German and Austrian nationalists through the Trentino. This provocative excursion had been given advance publicity in the press. As they passed through Italian speaking villages they were met by hostile crowds. On reaching Calliano an angry mob overwhelmed the protecting police and attacked the party resulting in some serious injuries. There was outrage—anti-Italian demonstrations took place in Innsbruck, the incident was widely reported in the Austrian and German newspapers and Austrian and German government officials lodged official complaints with the Italian government. On the 5 August 1907 Meyer, with a bandaged head, spoke to an enthusiastic crowd in Innsbruck.

In 1916–1917 Meyer founded the Ausschuss für völkische Belange und deutsche Besiedlung Südtirols (Committee for National Affairs and German Colonization of the Trentino)

With his castle in ruins and following the annexation of South Tyrol by Italy in 1918, Meyer turned his attention towards the Jewish community in Austria. In 1919 the Tyrolese Anti-Semitic Association was formed. Meyer was one of the main speakers at its inaugural meeting in Innsbruck. He cited Jewish subversion as one of the reasons for the break-up of the Austro-Hungarian monarchy, perpetuating the Stab-in-the-back myth.

== Works (selection) ==
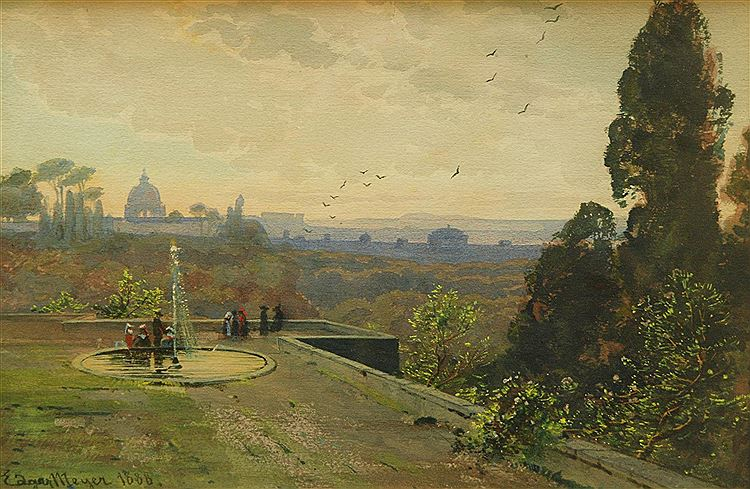
Blick auf Rom 1880

- Partie aus Palermo (1873)
- Aus Eppan (1885)
- On the Rhine at Dusseldorf
- Market place in Verona
- Evening in the Roman countryside
- Der Schwarzsee bei Kitzbühel
- Palazzo an der Amalfiküste
- Venedig, Torbögen
- Insel San Michele Venedig
- Schloss Welfenstein (1905)
