= Jan Grolich =

Czech politician

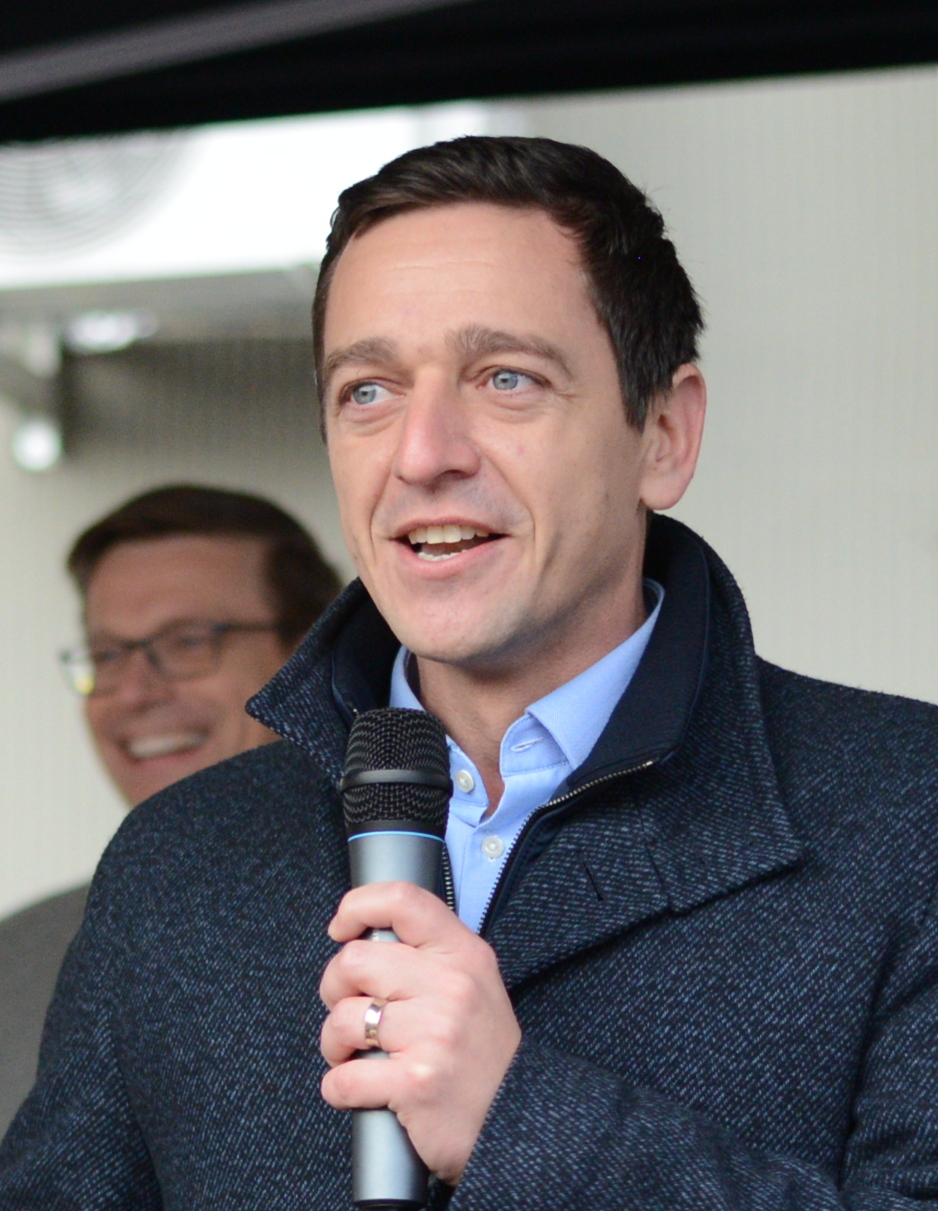
- Grolich in 2022

Senator from Vyškov
- Incumbent
- Assumed office 10 October 2026
- Preceded by: Karel Zitterbart

Governor of the South Moravian Region
- Incumbent
- Assumed office 11 November 2020
- Preceded by: Bohumil Šimek

Leader of KDU–ČSL
- Incumbent
- Assumed office 24 April 2026
- Preceded by: Marek Výborný

Member of the Council of the South Moravian Region
- Incumbent
- Assumed office 8 October 2016

Personal details
- Born: 11 June 1984 (age 42) Brno, Czechoslovakia
- Party: KDU-ČSL
- Education: Masaryk University

Jan Grolich (born 11 June 1984) is a Czech politician, lawyer and former stand-up comedian who has served as the leader of KDU-ČSL since April 2026 and as Senator from Vyškov since October 2026. Grolich has served as representative of the municipality of Velatice and Governor of South Moravian Region, respectively since 2010 and 2020.

== Early life ==
Grolich was born in Brno on 11 June 1984. He completed his law practice in Brno, passing the bar exams already during his mayoralty. Grolich also used to be a stand-up comedian.

== Political career ==
=== 2010s ===
In the 2010 Czech municipal elections, Grolich was elected as local candidate, representing the municipality of Velatice for KDU-ČSL. He later became mayor, having defended the mandate of representative in the 2014 and 2018 municipal elections. In the 2022 municipal elections, Grolich ran for council in Velatice from the second-place candidate and eventually defended the mandate of village representative.

In the 2016 Czech regional elections, Grolich was elected as a representative of the South Moravian Region for the KDU-ČSL. In the 2020 regional elections, he was leader of the KDU-ČSL in the South Moravian Region and defended the mandate of the regional representative.

In the 2017 Czech parliamentary election, Grolich ran in the last place of the KDU-ČSL candidate in the South Moravian Region, but was unsuccessful.

=== 2020s ===
In the 2020 Czech regional elections, Grolich was the leader of the KDU-ČSL candidate in the South Moravian Region. He was the third most circled politician in the country, ahead of him only Martin Kupka (ODS) and Vít Rakušan (STAN). After the elections, within the post-election coalition of KDU-ČSL, Czech Pirate Party and ODS for South Moravia, Grolich became the governor of the South Moravian Region on 11 November 2020 and subsequently resigned from the post of mayor of Velatice. In February 2024, he became the leader of the candidate list of the Spolu coalition for the regional elections in 2024 in the South Moravian Region.

On 24 April 2026, Grolich was elected in a KDU-ČSL leadership election, with 233 out of 266 votes, being the only candidate.

On 10 October 2026, Grolich was elected to the Senate of the Czech Republic in the first round, with record breaking 37,071 votes (63,34%).

== Personal life ==
Grolich lives in Velatice and claims to be a Moravian. Since 2010, he has been married to Magdalena Grolichová.
