= 1907 Cisleithanian legislative election in the Kingdom of Dalmatia =

- 17 May 1907

All 11 Dalmatian seats in the Imperial Council
	First party	Second party	Third party
Party	People's Party	Party of Rights	Serbian Party
Last election	6 seats	3 seats	2 seats
Seats won	6 / 11	2 / 11	2 / 11
Seat change	Steady	▼1	Steady

Elections to the Cisleithanian Imperial Council were held in the Kingdom of Dalmatia on 17 May 1907 to elect the eleven Dalmatian members of the Imperial Council as part of the wider Cisleithanian elections. The eleven members were elected from single-seat constituencies by universal male suffrage.

== Results ==
Party	Votes	%	Seats	+/–
Croatian Nation
Party of Rights	17,066	25.76	2	–1
People's Party (Resolutionist)	15,838	23.90	4	New
People's Party (Anti-Resolutionist)	12,687	19.15	2	New
People's Party (Democratic)	4,638	7.00	0	New
Croatian Independents	4,245	6.41	1	+1
Serbian Nation
Serb People's Party	7,808	11.78	2	0
Serbian Independents	3,975	6.00	0	0
Italian Nation
Italian Independents	2	0.00	0	0
Total	66,259	100.00	11	0
Valid votes	66,259	99.29		
Invalid/blank votes	475	0.71		
Total votes	66,734	100.00		
Registered voters/turnout	135,353	49.30		
Source: ANNO

=== Elected lists and candidates ===
Croatian Party	Party of Rights	Serbian Party	Independent
Ante Dulibić; Vicko Ivčević; Frane Ivanišević; Ante Tresić Pavičić; Ante Vuković-Vučidolski; Juraj Biankini	Ivo Prodan; Josip Virgil Perić	Dušan Baljak; Miho Bjeladinović	Frane Bulić
