= Max Wladimir von Beck =

Austrian statesman and minister-president of Austria

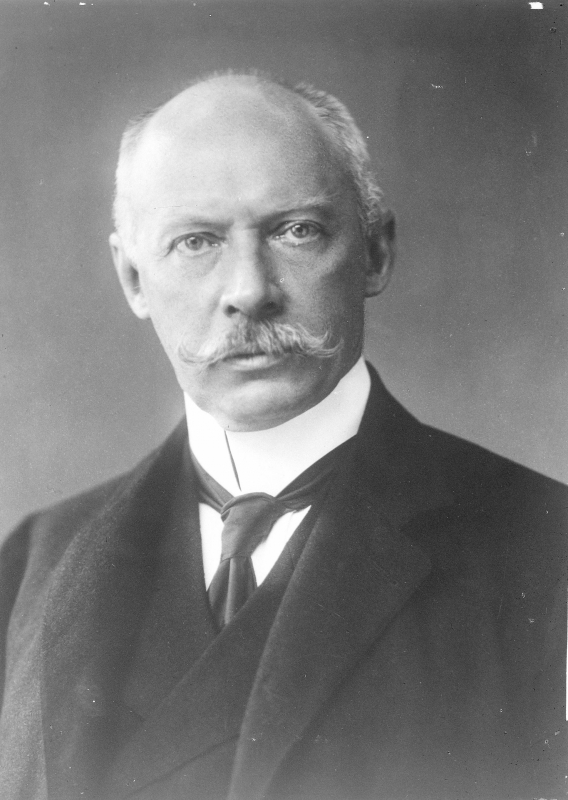
- Baron Max Wladimir von Beck
- Born: 6 September 1854; Vienna, Austrian Empire
- Died: 20 January 1943 (aged 88); Vienna, Nazi Germany
- Occupation: Statesman
- Title: Baron

Baron Max Wladimir von Beck (6 September 1854, in Vienna – 20 January 1943, in Vienna) was an Austrian statesman who served as minister-president of Austria.

Beck was selected as the main motif of an Austrian collectors' coin, the 100 Years of Universal Male Suffrage commemorative coin, minted on January 10, 2007. The coin design is based on a historic photo of the opening session of Parliament in 1907, right after the elections. They were the first Austrian elections held under universal male suffrage, after an electoral reform abolishing tax paying requirements for voters had been adopted by the Council and endorsed by Emperor Franz Joseph earlier that year.

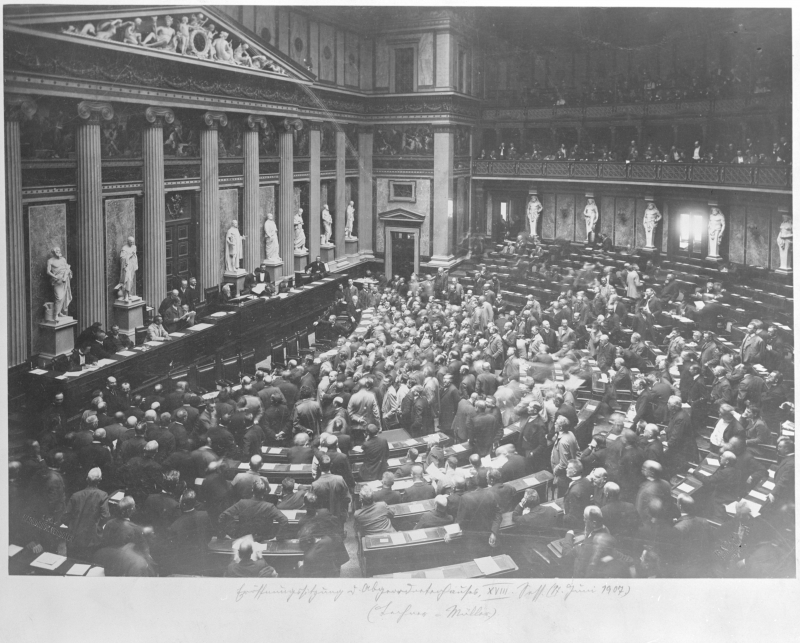
Opening session of the House of Deputies, 17 June 1907
