= Czechoslovak government-in-exile =

Government-in-exile during World War II

Provisional Government of Czechoslovakia Prozatímní státní zřízení Dočasné štátne zriadenie
- 1939–1945
- Flag Coat of arms
- Motto: Pravda vítězí / Pravda víťazí "Truth prevails"
- Anthem: Kde domov můj (Czech); Where Is My Home; "Nad Tatrou sa blýska" (English: "Lightning Over the Tatras")
- Status: Government in exile
- Capital: Prague (de jure)
- Capital-in-exile: Paris (1939–40); London (1940–45)
- Official languages: Czechoslovak
- President
  - 1939–1945: Edvard Beneš
- Prime Minister
  - 1940–1945: Jan Šrámek
- Historical era: World War II
  - Munich Agreement: 30 September 1938
  - German occupation of Czechoslovakia: 15 March 1939
  - Formation of government in Košice and Surrender of Nazi Germany: 5 April 1945
Preceded by	Succeeded by
Second Czechoslovak Republic	Third Czechoslovak Republic

The Czechoslovak government-in-exile, sometimes styled officially as the Provisional Government of Czechoslovakia (Czech: Prozatímní vláda Československa; Slovak: Dočasná vláda Československa), previously in 1939 to 1940 the Czechoslovak National Committee (Czech: Československý národní výbor; Slovak: Československý národný výbor), initially by British diplomatic recognition. The name came to be used by other Allied governments during the Second World War as they subsequently recognised it. The committee was originally created by the former Czechoslovak President, Edvard Beneš in Paris, France, in October 1939. Unsuccessful negotiations with France for diplomatic status, as well as the impending Nazi occupation of France, forced the committee to withdraw to London in 1940. The Czechoslovak Government-in-Exile offices were at various locations in London but mainly at a building called Fursecroft, Marylebone.

It was regarded as the legitimate government for Czechoslovakia throughout the Second World War by the Allies. A specifically anti-Fascist government, it sought to reverse the Munich Agreement and the subsequent German occupation of Czechoslovakia, and to return the Republic to its 1937 boundaries. As such it was ultimately considered, by those countries that recognized it, the legal continuation of the First Czechoslovak Republic.

== From committee to government ==
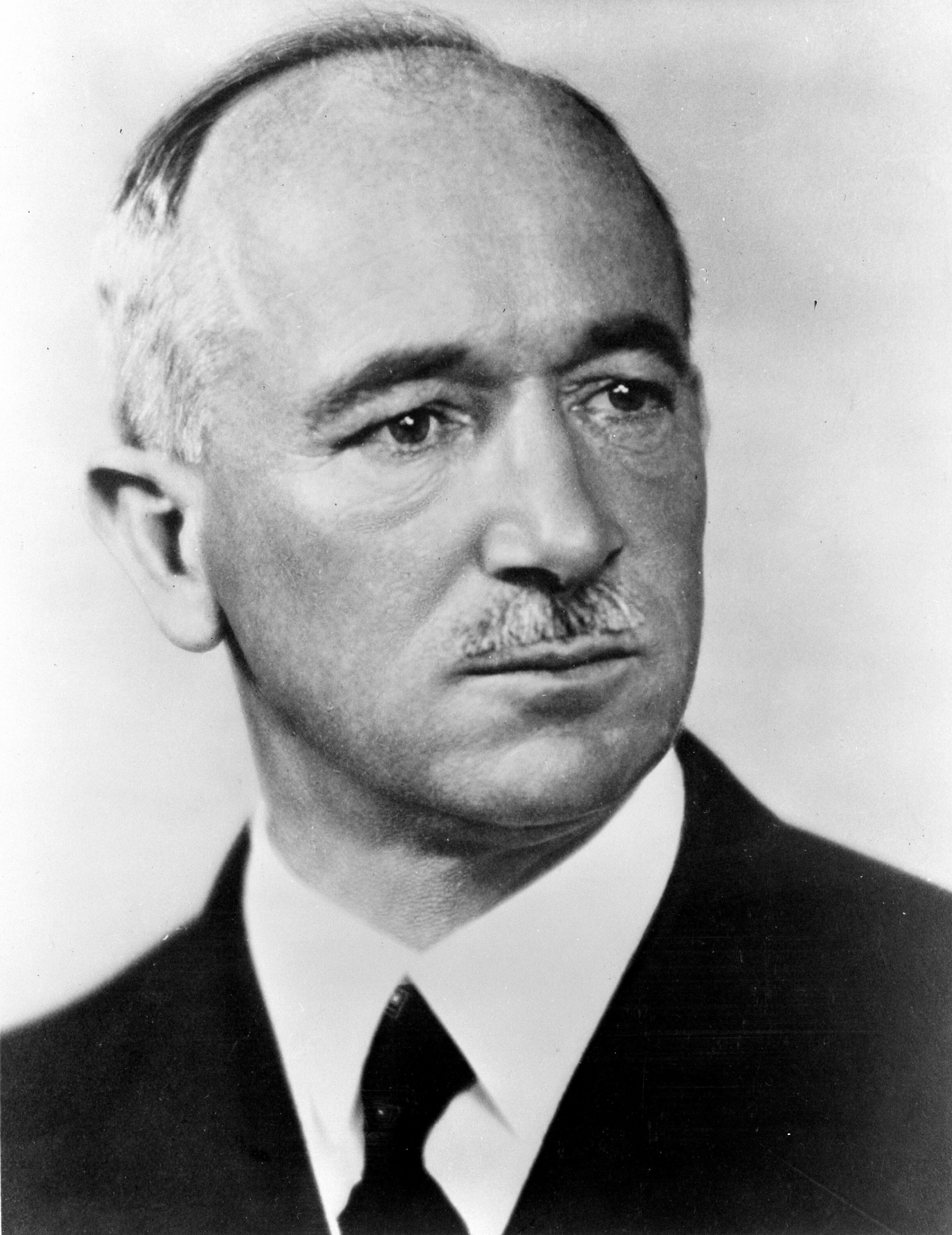
Edvard Beneš

Seeing the end of the First Czechoslovak Republic as a fait accompli, Edvard Beneš resigned as president one week after the Munich Agreement ceded the Sudetenland to Nazi Germany. He initially fled to London. On 15 February 1939, he arrived in Chicago; he became visiting professor at the University of Chicago, where he took refuge in the same community that had once buoyed his predecessor and friend, Tomáš Masaryk. While there, he was urged to quickly return to Europe to organize some kind of government-in-exile. He therefore returned to Europe in July to live in Paris along with several other key players in his former administration. After World War II formally began, the group became known as the Czech National Liberation Committee and immediately began to seek international recognition as the exiled government of Czechoslovakia. Claiming that his 1938 resignation had been under duress, Beneš named himself president. Longtime People's Party leader Jan Šrámek became prime minister.

By the end of 1939, though, France and Britain had extended it the right to conclude international treaties – France on 13 November and Britain on 20 December 1939 – but did not yet see those treaties as having been concluded in the name of the Czechoslovak Republic.

It was in fact France itself that proved the greatest obstacle to accepting the committee as a full government-in-exile. The government of Édouard Daladier was ambivalent towards the ambitions of the Committee and of Czechoslovakia in general. Though he had publicly seen the appeasement of Hitler as the road to war, Daladier ultimately capitulated to the wishes of Neville Chamberlain. After the war came, he and his government dithered over whether the Soviet or Nazi threat was the greater. Likewise, though he extended recognition to the committee as a non-governmental agency, his government was non-committal to Beneš himself, and saw many possibilities for a post-war Czechoslovakia.

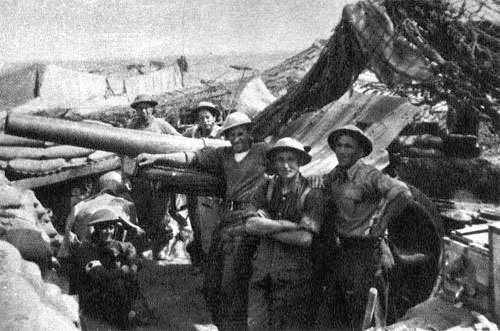
The Czechoslovak 11th Infantry Battalion fighting alongside Poles and Australians at the Siege of Tobruk

One of its principal reservations about giving governmental status to Beneš, was the fact of the murky situation in the then-independent Slovakia (which was a satellite state of Nazi Germany). The French government of the winter of 1939–1940 felt that Beneš was not necessarily speaking for all Czechoslovaks, based on the relatively fluid situation in Slovakia. France's diplomacy towards Beneš was therefore agile. It avoided any direct expression of support for the Beneš Committee's desire to return to the First Republic. However, as Beneš was the key to getting military support from the well-trained Czechoslovak Army, France was in fact the first nation to conclude a treaty with the committee. 2 October 1939 agreement between France and Beneš allowed for the reconstitution of the Czechoslovak army on French territory. Ultimately, units of the First Division of the Czechoslovak Army fought alongside their hosts in the final stages of the Battle of France.

It was the failure of the Allied military forces in this battle which most directly helped the ambitions of the Beneš Committee. With the fall of France, the views of the newly appointed prime minister Winston Churchill took predominance over the concerns of the waning Third Republic. He was very much clearer than his predecessor Chamberlain with respect to Czechoslovak affairs, and quickly recognized Beneš as the president of a government-in-exile after the fall of France. Nevertheless, the Committee still felt somewhat insecure about this recognition, because it specifically mentioned Beneš as president, but did not explicitly link Beneš to the previously existing government. Thus, they pressed the British in April 1941 for even greater clarity. On the 18th of that month, they sent a letter to the British requesting that their agreements "be concluded, as before September, 1938, in the name of the Czechoslovak Republic". British Foreign Minister Anthony Eden gave such assent on 18 July 1941.

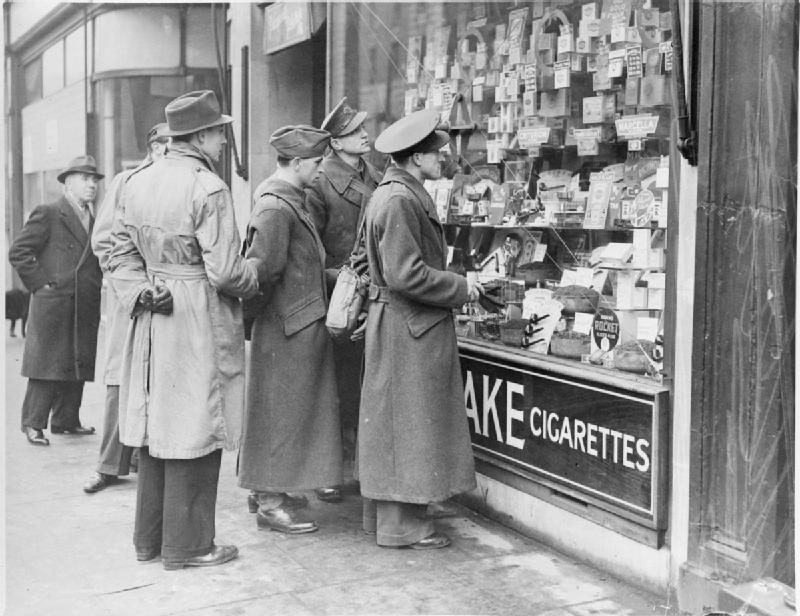
Czechoslovak troops in London

The United States and the Soviet Union were effectively forced to do the same later in the year, as Slovakia declared war on the two countries. With an Axis government both firmly and formally in place in Bratislava, the only friendly government left to recognize by the later half of 1941 was that of Beneš. The remaining legal question was whether the Beneš government was actually a continuation of the First Republic, or a successor without solid constitutional underpinnings. This doubt was erased by the spring of 1942. Following almost six months of planning behind enemy lines, Czechoslovak Allied operatives in Bohemia fatally wounded Reinhard Heydrich, the dictator at the head of the Protectorate of Bohemia and Moravia. The success of this mission, Operation Anthropoid, caused Britain and Free France (itself a government-in-exile) to formally repudiate the Munich Agreement, thus conferring de jure legitimacy on the Beneš government as the continuation of the First Republic. The government's continued health now depended on Allied military victory.

== Planning for the future ==
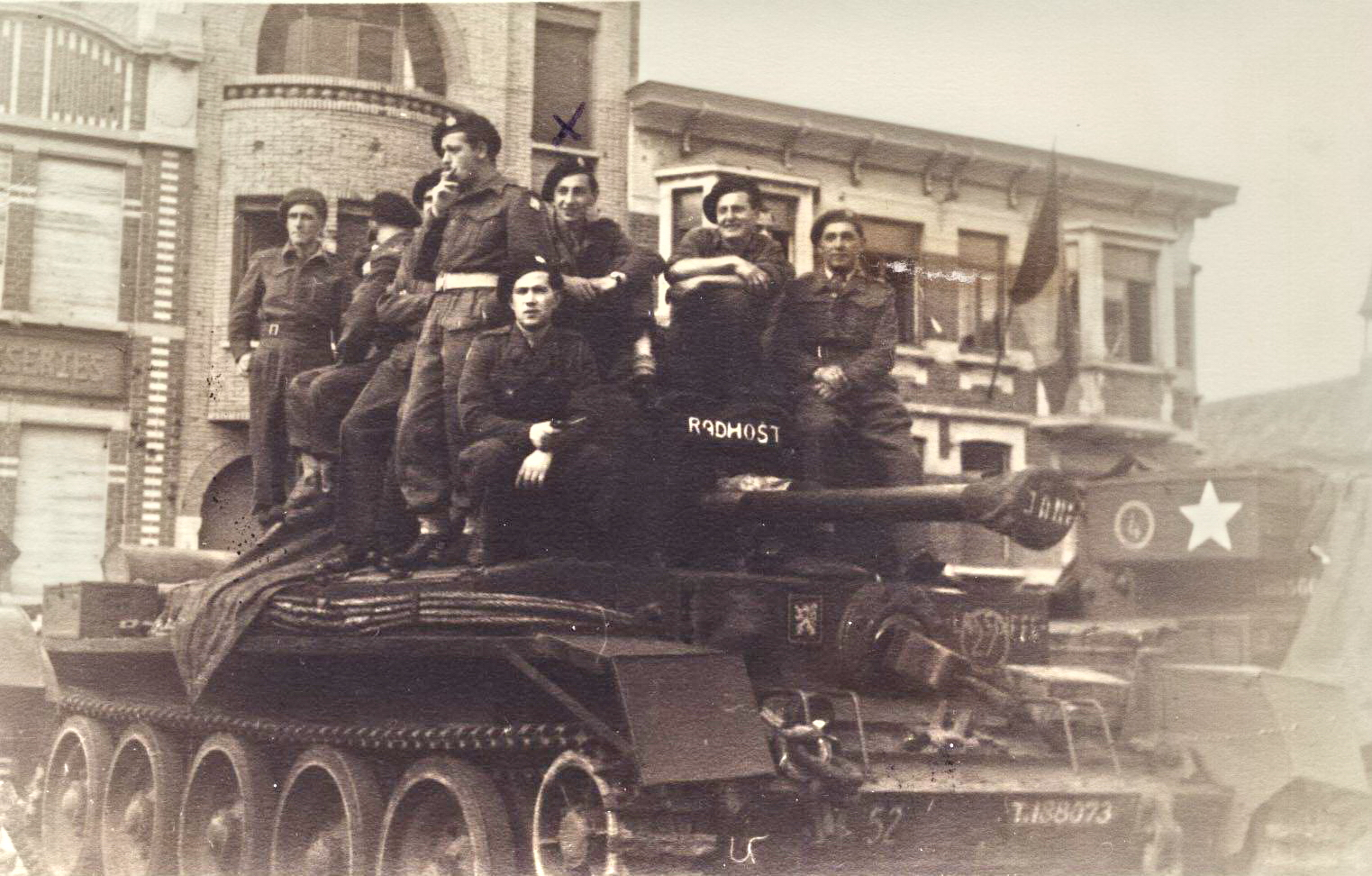
Troops from the 1st Czechoslovak Armoured Brigade, part of the British army, photographed in De Panne in 1945

Beneš hoped for a restoration of the Czechoslovak state in its pre-Munich form after the anticipated Allied victory, a false hope.

Beneš determined to strengthen Czechoslovak security against future German aggression through alliances with Poland and the Soviet Union. The Soviet Union, however, objected to a tripartite Czechoslovak-Polish-Soviet commitment. In December 1943, Beneš's government concluded a treaty with the Soviets. Beneš's interest in maintaining friendly relations with the Soviet Union was motivated also by his desire to avoid Soviet encouragement of a postwar Communist coup in Czechoslovakia. Beneš worked to bring Czechoslovak Communist exiles in the United Kingdom into cooperation with his government, offering far-reaching concessions, including nationalization of heavy industry and the creation of local people's committees at the war's end. In March 1945, he gave key cabinet positions to Czechoslovak Communist exiles in the USSR.

=== The "German problem" ===
During the latter years of the war, Beneš worked toward resolving the German minority problem and received consent from the Allies for a solution based on a postwar transfer of the Sudeten German population. Especially after the Nazi reprisals for the assassination of Heydrich, most of the Czech resistance groups demanded, based on German Nazi terror during occupation, the "final solution of the German question" (Czech: konečné řešení německé otázky) which would have to be "solved" by deportation of the ethnic Germans to Germany and Austria.

These demands were adopted by the Government-in-Exile, which sought the support of the Allies for this proposal, beginning in 1943. The Government-in-Exile promulgated a series of laws that are now referred to as the "Beneš decrees". One part of these decrees dealt with the status of ethnic Germans and Hungarians in postwar Czechoslovakia, including the confiscation of their property, anticipating their future deportation (see expulsion of Germans from Czechoslovakia, and Hungarians in Slovakia). However, the final agreement authorizing the forced population transfer of the Germans was not reached until 2 August 1945 at the end of the Potsdam Conference.

== List of presidents of Czechoslovakia ==
Edvard Beneš (October 1939–2 April 1945)

== List of prime ministers of Czechoslovakia ==
Jan Šrámek (21 July 1940 – 5 April 1945)
