= Václav Pláteník =

Czech politician (born 1990)

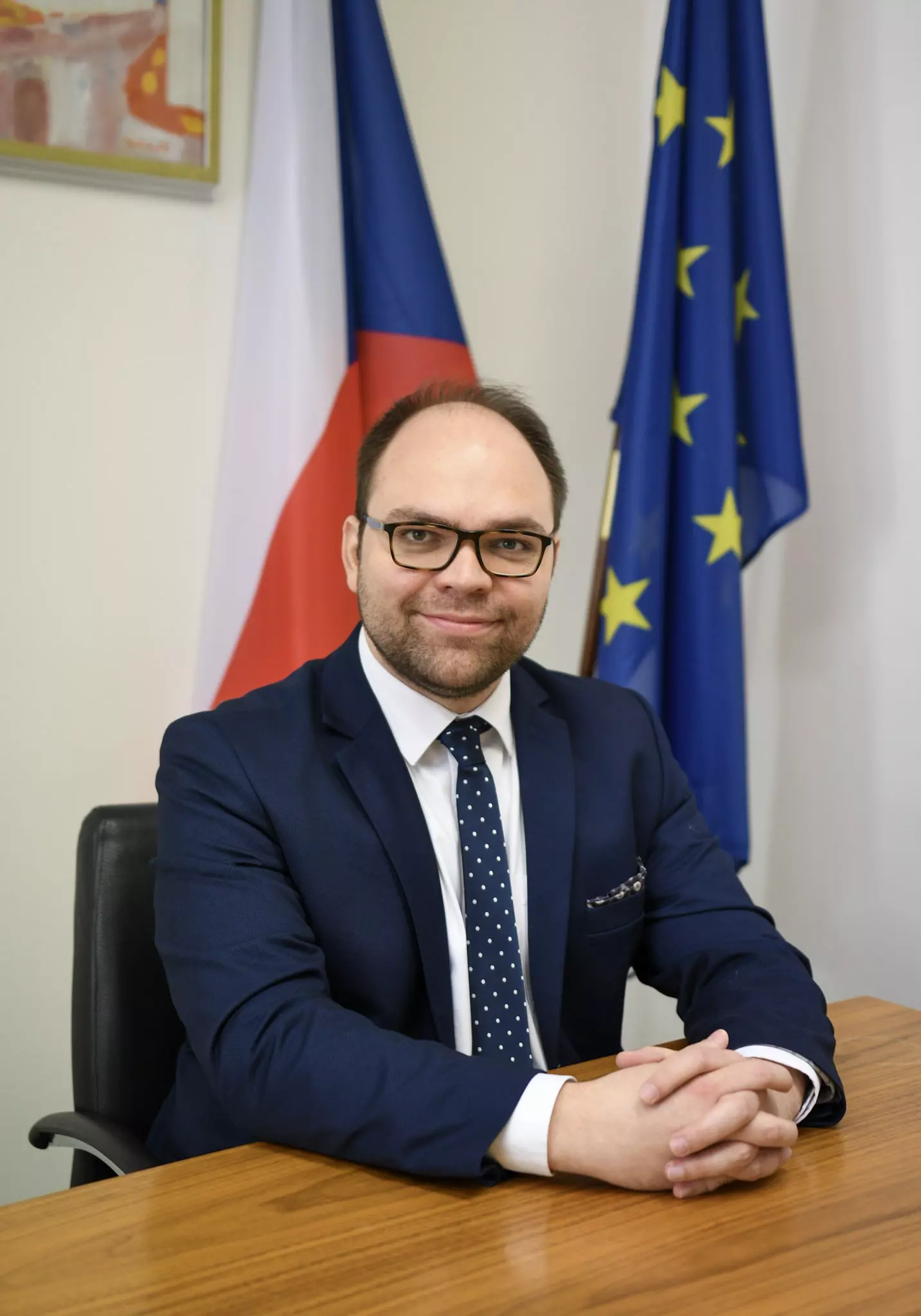
- Pláteník in 2023

Member of the Chamber of Deputies
- Incumbent
- Assumed office 4 October 2025
- Constituency: Zlín Region

Personal details
- Born: 2 April 1990 (age 36) Tábor, Czech Republic
- Party: KDU-ČSL (since 2014)
- Education: Charles University

Václav Pláteník (born 2 April 1990) is a Czech politician serving as a member of the Chamber of Deputies since 2025. From 2023 to 2025, he served as deputy minister of health.
