= 2026 KDU–ČSL leadership election =

Czech political party leadership election

- 24 April 2026
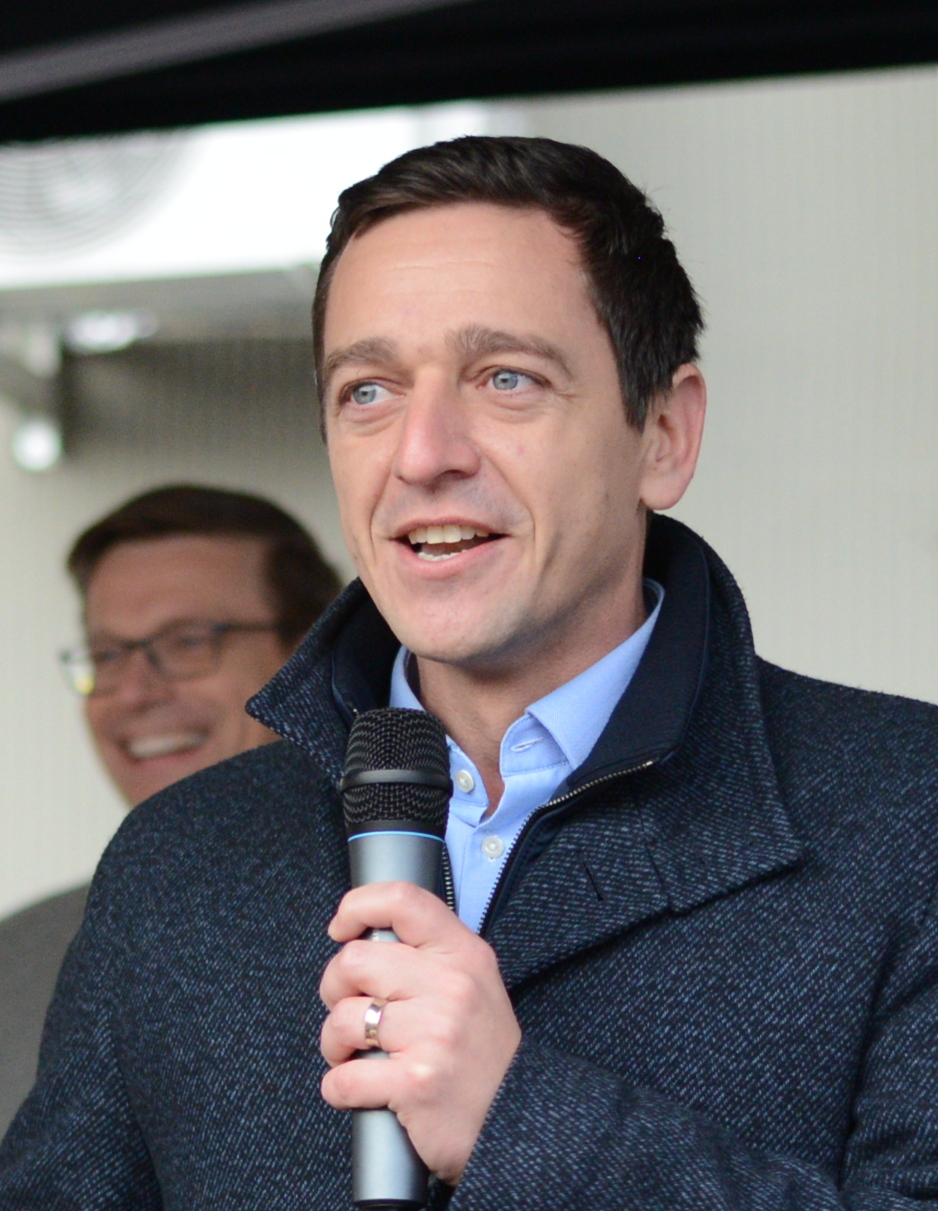
Candidate	Jan Grolich
Electoral vote	233
Percentage	88%
leader of KDU-ČSL before election
Marek Výborný
Elected leader of KDU-ČSL
Jan Grolich

A leadership election for KDU-ČSL was held on 24 April 2026. Jan Grolich was elected the new leader.

== Background ==
Marek Výborný was elected the party leader in 2024 election. The party then participated in 2025 parliamentary election under Spolu alliance and received 16 seats in the Chamber of Deputies. Following the election, Výborný announced on 10 October 2025 that the party will hold a meetig on 24 and 25 April 2026. Leadership election was scheduled to be party of the meeting. Výborný also stated that he considers whether he will run for reelection. On 16 November 2025, South Moravian governor Jan Grolich admitted that he considers running, while CNN Prima News reported that according to its sources within the party, Grolich will almost certainly run. Seznam Zprávy reported on 26 January 2026, that Grolich intends to run and on 28 January 2026 is scheduled to announce a "major decision" about his future political activities.

On 28 January 2026, Výborný announced he won't run while Grolich announced his candidacy.

== Candidates ==
- Jan Grolich, Governor of the South Moravian Region

=== Declined ===
- Marek Výborný, the incumbent leader

== Voting ==
Grolich ran unopposed and received 233 of 266 votes.

Candidate	Vote	%
Jan Grolich	233	87.59%
Against	33	12.41%
