= 1907 Cisleithanian legislative election in the Margraviate of Istria =

Elections in Croatia

1907 Cisleithanian legislative election
- 1907

All 6 seats to the Reichsrat
	First party	Second party	Third party
Party	Croatian-Slovene Party	Italian Liberal National Party	Italian People's Party
Seats won	3 / 6	2 / 6	1 / 6
Seat change	▲3

The Cisleithanian legislative election, 1907 was held in 1907 in the Margraviate of Istria by universal male suffrage.

== Results ==
Party	Votes	%	Seats	+/–
Croatian Nation
People's Party	25,099	49.04	2	+2
Italian Nation
Italian National-Liberal Party	14,737	28.79	2	–2
Italian Christian Social Party	5,713	11.16	1	+1
Slovenian Nation
Slovenian National Party	5,113	9.99	1	+1
Croatian and Slovenian Nation
Slavic Social Democratic Party	522	1.02	0	New
Total	51,184	100.00	6	+1
Valid votes	51,184	99.10		
Invalid/blank votes	467	0.90		
Total votes	51,651	100.00		
Registered voters/turnout	89,174	57.92		
Source: ANNO

=== Elected lists and candidates ===
Croatian-Slovene Party	Italian Liberal National Party	Italian People's Party
Matko Mandić; Matko Laginja; Vjekoslav Spinčić	Matteo Bartoli; Benedetto Polesini	Pietro Spadaro
