= Velatice =

- Municipality
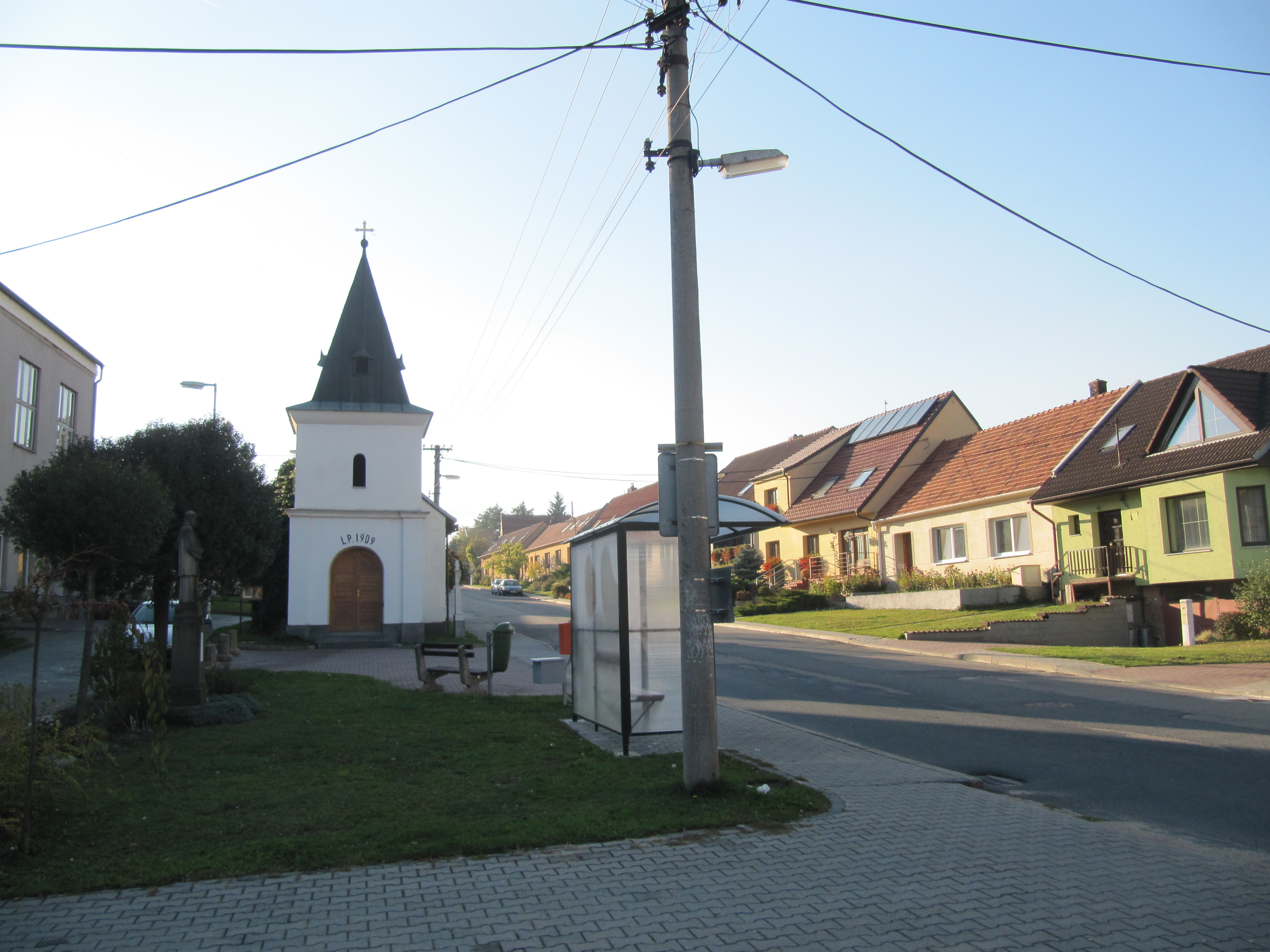
- Centre of Velatice with the Chapel of Saint Anne

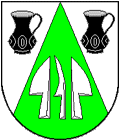
- Flag Coat of arms

- Location in the Czech Republic
- Coordinates: 49°11′51″N 16°45′13″E
- Country: Czech Republic
- Region: South Moravian
- District: Brno-Country
- First mentioned: 1288

Area
  - Total: 2.26 km^{2} (0.87 sq mi)
- Elevation: 252 m (827 ft)

Population (2026-01-01)
  - Total: 774
  - Density: 342/km^{2} (887/sq mi)
- Time zone: UTC+1 (CET)
  - Summer (DST): UTC+2 (CEST)
- Postal code: 664 05
- Website: www.velatice.cz

Velatice is a municipality and village in Brno-Country District in the South Moravian Region of the Czech Republic. It has about 800 inhabitants.

Velatice lies approximately 10 kilometres (6 mi) east of Brno and 195 km (121 mi) south-east of Prague.

== Demographics ==
Historical population
| Year | Pop. | ±% |
|---|---|---|
| 1869 | 418 | — |
| 1880 | 459 | +9.8% |
| 1890 | 495 | +7.8% |
| 1900 | 517 | +4.4% |
| 1910 | 570 | +10.3% |
| 1921 | 573 | +0.5% |
| 1930 | 575 | +0.3% |
| 1950 | 592 | +3.0% |
| 1961 | 629 | +6.2% |
| 1970 | 585 | −7.0% |
| 1980 | 522 | −10.8% |
| 1991 | 513 | −1.7% |
| 2001 | 561 | +9.4% |
| 2011 | 648 | +15.5% |
| 2021 | 756 | +16.7% |
Source: Censuses
