= Tiroler Volksbund =

The Tiroler Volksbund was a patriotic and Pan-Germanist association founded on May 5, 1905.

The organization was dedicated to the idea that Tyrol should remain united and defend its centuries-old traditions and languages (German, Italian, and Ladin), and it opposed the separatist movement funded by Italian entities in the Trentino region (Italian Tyrol). It promoted an anti-irredentist program and the revival of the German language in the Germanic communities of southern Tyrol, which had been Italianized at the end of the 18th century.

In his 1911 pamphlet Il Trentino veduto da un socialista, Benito Mussolini gives an overview of the situation in Trentino: On the one hand, there are Pan-German organizations such as Volksbund, the Deutscher Schulverein and Süd-Mark, while from other hand you have associations in defense of Italian language and cultural such as the Lega Nazionale e le società Pro Patria.

In 1919 it changed its name to the Andreas-Hofer-Bund Tirol. During the 1920s and 1930s it collaborated with Deutscher Schulverein to finance a system of clandestine German schools. The organization was dissolved in 1938, after the Anschluss, by order of the Third Reich.

On August the 15, 1994 the association has been re-founded.
