= KDU-ČSL =

Czech political party

- Abbreviation: KDU-ČSL
- Chairman: Jan Grolich
- Deputy Leaders: Benjamin Činčila; Monika Brzesková; Libuše Hubáčková; Václav Pláteník; František Talíř
- Secretary General: Pavel Hořava
- Chamber of Deputies Leader: Marian Jurečka
- Senate Leader: Josef Klement
- MEP Leader: Tomáš Zdechovský
- Founder: Jan Šrámek
- Founded: 3 January 1919; 107 years ago
- Merger of: MSKSSM, KNKSM, ČKSSKČ, KNKSČ, KSL
- Headquarters: Palác Charitas, Karlovo náměstí 5, Prague
- Newspaper: HLAS křesťanské demokracie
- Think tank: Institute for Christian Democratic Politics
- Youth wing: Young Populars
- Women's wing: Women's Association
- Membership: 17,325
- Ideology: Christian democracy; Social conservatism
- Political position: Centre to centre-right
- National affiliation: National Front (1945; 1990); Four-Coalition (1998–2002); Spolu (2020–2026)
- European affiliation: European People's Party
- European Parliament group: European People's Party Group
- International affiliation: Centrist Democrat International; Historical: White International
- Colors: Yellow; Black
- Chamber of Deputies: 16 / 200
- Senate: 12 / 81
- European Parliament: 1 / 21
- Regional councils: 49 / 685
- Governors of the regions: 1 / 13
- Local councils: 2,722 / 61,677

Website
- novi-lidovci.cz

KDU-ČSL (In Czech, the initials of the Christian and Democratic Union – Czechoslovak People's Party; Czech: Křesťanská a demokratická unie – Československá strana lidová), often shortened to lidovci ("the populars"), is a Christian democratic political party in the Czech Republic, led by Jan Grolich since April 2026. The party has taken part in most of the Czech government coalitions since 1990, and has been represented in every parliament except for the 6th Czech parliament (2010–2013). It currently forms part of the parliamentary opposition, having been elected on the lists of the Spolu electoral alliance.

== History ==
After the collapse of the Habsburg monarchy, the dissolution of Austria-Hungary, and the formation of the First Czechoslovak Republic, Jan Šrámek helped unite a number of Catholic political parties to create the Czechoslovak People's Party (ČSL) in 1919. The party remained continuously active throughout the twentieth century. After the German occupation of Czechoslovakia, Šrámek served as head of the Czechoslovak government in exile in the United Kingdom. After 1945, ČSL was part of the national unity government, forming its most right-wing section. It was one of many parties brought together in the National Front, which was initially a tripartisme-style coalition meant to drive out the Nazis, but was permanently used by the Communist Party of Czechoslovakia (KSČ) to control political and social activities in the country, especially after the 1948 Czechoslovak coup d'etat.

Since the Velvet Revolution in 1989, the party has participated in almost every Czech government. In the June 2006 parliamentary election, KDU-ČSL won 7.2% of the vote and 13 out of 200 seats. However, in the 2010 election, its vote share dropped to 4.4%, and the party lost all of its seats. The party regained its parliamentary representation in the 2013 parliamentary election, winning 14 seats in the new parliament, thus becoming the first party ever to return to the Chamber of Deputies after previously dropping out.

In 2015, the KDU-ČSL leadership established a think tank, the Institute for Christian Democratic Politics (Institut pro křesťansko-demokratickou politiku), to promote Christian Democratic political ideas. The foundation's headquarters are located in the party's headquarters in Palác Charitas in Prague.

On 12 April 2017, KDU-ČSL signed an agreement with STAN to participate in 2017 parliamentary election as a coalition. Coalition needed to get more 10% of votes get over threshold. The coalition disintegrated before the election, thus the party went into the elections standalone, receiving 5.8% of votes.

In March 2019 the party was officially renamed to its common abbreviation, KDU-ČSL, and Marek Výborný became the new party leader. After the death of his wife, Výborný announced his resignation in November 2019 for personal reasons.

On 24 April 2026, Jan Grolich was elected in a KDU-ČSL leadership election, with 233 out of 266 votes, as the only candidate.

=== Membership ===
KDU-ČSL had 27,662 members in 2015, the second largest member base of any party in the Czech Republic. The number has been decreasing since the 1990s when the party had 100,000 members.

1991	1992	1999	2008	2012	2013	2014	2015	2016	2019	2026
95,435	88,000	60,000	40,000	33,000	29,976	28,541	27,662	26,420	21,870	17,325

=== Party strongholds ===
KDU-ČSL is known to have very strong electoral core concentrated primarily in South Moravia. The party has very stable electoral support thanks to the rural voters in Moravia and has managed to gain seats in the Chamber of Deputies during every election cycle in the Czech Republic since 1990 with the exception of 2010.

=== Names over time ===
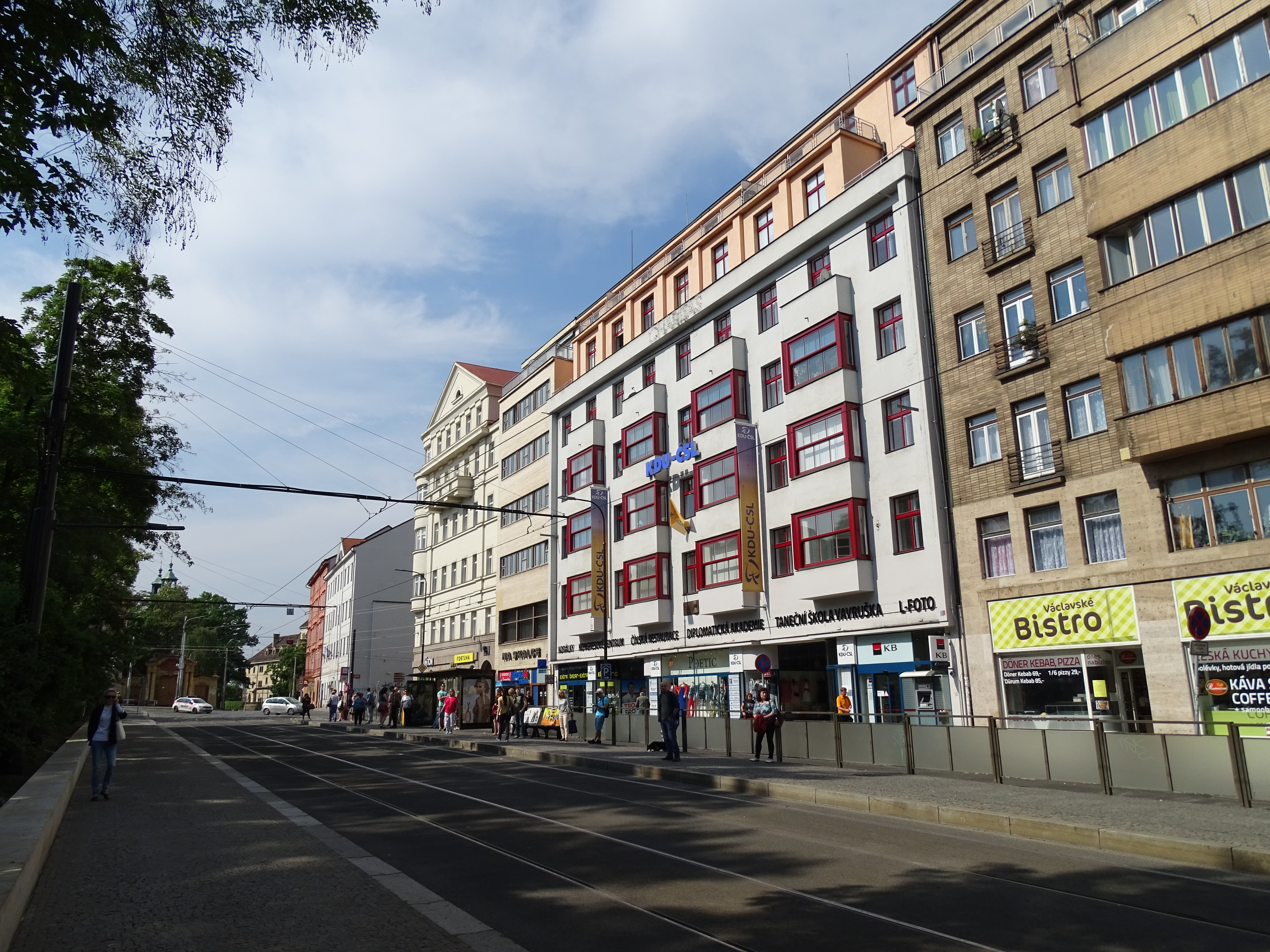
Headquarters of KDU ČSL, Charitas Palace in Prague

- 1919–1992 The Czechoslovak People's Party (Československá strana lidová) – merger of Moravian-Silesian Christian Social Party in Moravia, Catholic-National Conservative Party in Moravia, Czech Christian Social Party in the Kingdom of Bohemia and Catholic-National Conservative Party in Bohemia, Conservative People's Party.
- 1992–2019 The Christian and Democratic Union – Czechoslovak People's Party (Křesťanská a demokratická unie – Československá strana lidová)
- Since 2019 KDU-ČSL - after renaming to party' abbreviation.

== Leaders ==
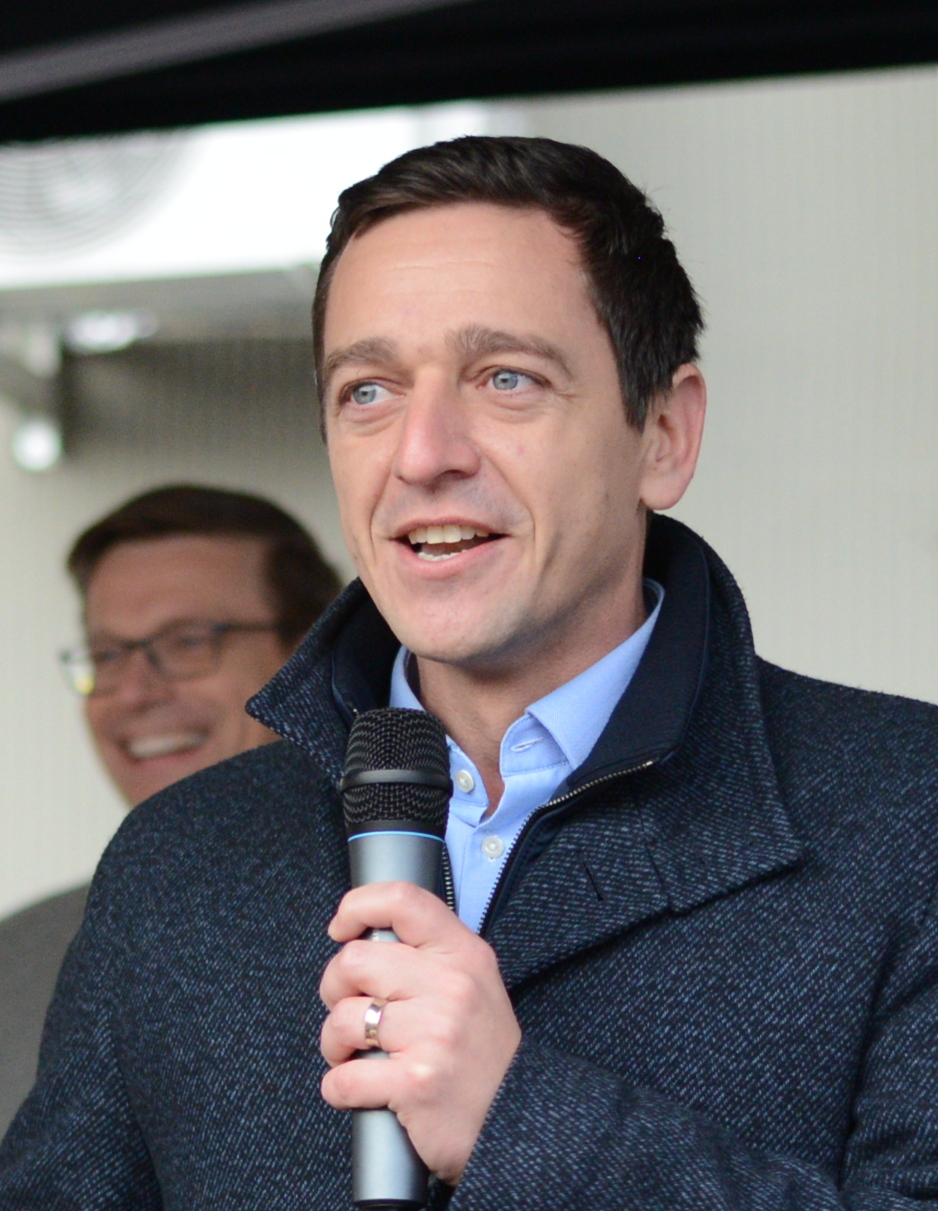
Current party leader and governor of South Moravian Region Jan Grolich

- Jan Šrámek (1922–1948)
- Alois Petr (1948–1951)
- Josef Plojhar (1951–1968)
- Antonín Pospíšil (1968–1973)
- Rostislav Petera (1973–1980)
- František Toman (1980–1981)
- Zbyněk Žalman (1981–1989)
- Josef Bartončík (1989–1990)
- Josef Lux (1990–1998)
- Jan Kasal (1999–2001)
- Cyril Svoboda (2001–2003)
- Miroslav Kalousek (2003–2006)
- Jan Kasal (2006)
- Jiří Čunek (2006–2009)
- Cyril Svoboda (2009–2010)
- Michaela Šojdrová (2010)
- Pavel Bělobrádek (2010–2019)
- Marek Výborný (2019–2020)
- Marian Jurečka (2020–2024)
- Marek Výborný (2024–2026)
- Jan Grolich (Since 2026)

== Symbols ==
KDU-ČSL had many symbols through history, with the current logo depicting a minimalist black wordmark 'Lidovci', intended to symbolize a 'thick line' behind the past and a modern restart for the party.

=== Logos ===
Party symbol, 1930s

Party logo, 1945–1992

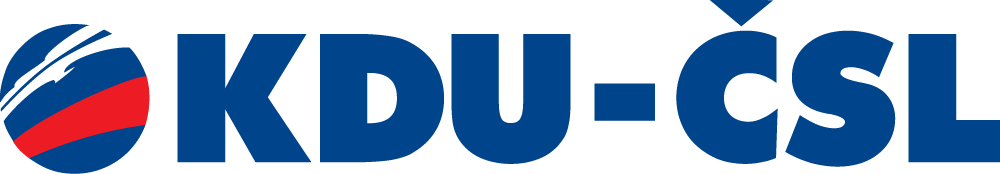
Party logo, 1992–2006

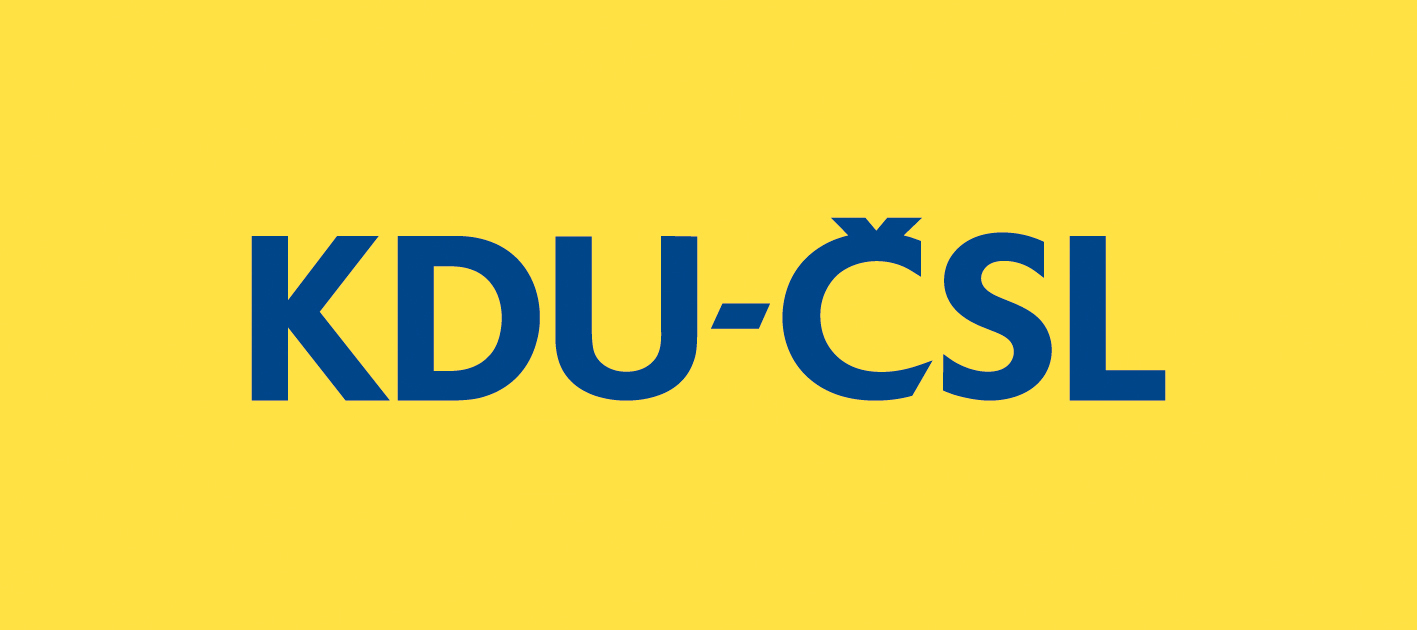
Party logo, 2006–2012

Party logo, 2012–2026

Electoral logo, 2024

Current party logo, since 2026

== Election results ==
=== Czechoslovakia wide elections ===
==== Legislative elections ====
Date	Leader	Votes		Seats			Position
Date	Leader	#	%	#	±	Size	Position
1920	Collective leadership	699,728	11.3	33 / 281	▲33	2nd	Opposition
1925	Jan Šrámek	691,238	9.7	31 / 300	▼2	3rd	Coalition
1929	Jan Šrámek	623,340	8.4	25 / 300	▼6	5th	Coalition
1935	Jan Šrámek	615,804	7.5	22 / 300	▼3	6th	Coalition
1946	Jan Šrámek	1,111,009	15.7	46 / 300	▲24	3rd	Coalition
1948	as part of National Front			23 / 300	▼23	4th	Bloc
1954	as part of National Front			20 / 368	▼3	3rd	Bloc
1960	as part of National Front			16 / 300	▼4	4th	Bloc
1964	as part of National Front			20 / 300	▲4	4th	Bloc
1971	as part of National Front			8 / 200	▼12	4th	Bloc
1976	as part of National Front			11 / 200	▲3	4th	Bloc
1981	as part of National Front			12 / 200	▲1	3rd	Bloc
1986	as part of National Front			11 / 200	▼1	4th	Bloc
1990	Josef Bartončík	629,359	5.9	9 / 150	▼2	5th	Support
1992	Josef Lux	388,122	4.0	7 / 150	▼2	7th	Coalition

=== Devolved assembly elections ===
==== Czech assembly elections ====
Date	Leader	Votes		Seats			Position
Date	Leader	#	%	#	±	Size	Position
1968	as part of National Front			25 / 200	▲25	3rd	Bloc
1971	as part of National Front			15 / 200	▼10	2nd	Bloc
1976	as part of National Front			14 / 200	▼1	3rd	Bloc
1981	as part of National Front			14 / 200	0	2nd	Bloc
1986	as part of National Front			14 / 200	0	2nd	Bloc
1990	Josef Bartončík	607,134	8.42	20 / 200	▲6	4th	Coalition
1992	Josef Lux	406,341	6.28	15 / 200	▼5	5th	Coalition

==== Slovak assembly elections ====
Date	Leader	Votes		Seats			Position
Date	Leader	#	%	#	±	Size	Position
1928	Martin Mičura	43,689	3.31	2 / 54	▲2	8th	–
1935	Martin Mičura	30,563	2.0	0 / 54	▼2	10th	–

=== Czech Republic wide elections ===
==== Legislative elections ====
Date	Leader	Votes		Seats			Position
Date	Leader	#	%	#	±	Size	Position
1996	Josef Lux	489,349	8.08	18 / 200	▲3	4th▲	ODS–KDU-ČSL–ODA
1998	Josef Lux	537,013	8.99	20 / 200	▲2	4th	Opposition
2002	Cyril Svoboda	680,670	14.27	22 / 200	▲11	4th	ČSSD–KDU-ČSL–US-DEU
2002	Part of Coalition, which won 31 seats in total						
2006	Miroslav Kalousek	386,706	7.23	13 / 200	▼18	4th	ODS–KDU-ČSL–SZ
2010	Cyril Svoboda	229,717	4.39	0 / 200	▼13	6th▼	No seats
2013	Pavel Bělobrádek	336.970	6.78	14 / 200	▲14	7th▼	ČSSD–ANO–KDU-ČSL
2017	Pavel Bělobrádek	293,643	5.80	10 / 200	▼4	7th	Opposition
2021	Marian Jurečka	1,493,701	27.79	23 / 200	▲13	2nd	Spolu – PirStan
2021	Part of Spolu coalition, which won 71 seats in total						
2025	Marek Výborný	1,313,346	23.4	16 / 200	▼7	2nd	Opposition
2025	Part of Spolu coalition, which won 52 seats in total						

==== Senate elections ====
Election	First round			Second round			Seats gained	Total seats
Election	Votes	%	No.	Votes	%	No.	Seats gained	Total seats
1996 (Note: The whole Senate was elected. Only one third of Senate was elected in all subsequent elections.)	274,316	9.9	4th	247,819	10.7	3rd	13 / 81	13 / 81
1998 (Note: Participated as part of Four-Coalition)	255,785	26.6	2nd	166,483	31.0	2nd	5 / 27	13 / 81
2000	121,355	14.1	4th	137,515	24.4	2nd	8 / 27	
2002	58,858	8.8	4th	47,049	5.7	4th	1 / 27	
2004	97,956	13.5	3rd	54,501	11.4	3rd	3 / 27	
2006	125,388	11.8	4th	59,603	10.4	3rd	4 / 27	10 / 81
2008	82,870	7.9	-	42,225	5.13	-	0 / 27	7 / 81
2010	87,182	7.6	4th	42,990	6.32	4th	2 / 27	6 / 81
2012	61,006	6.94	4th	14,995	2.92	4th	1 / 27	3 / 81
2014	84,328	8.21	5th	77,103	16.27	2nd	5 / 27	8 / 81
2016	74,709	8.48	5th	78,448	18.50	2nd	6 / 27	14 / 81
2018	99,383	9.12	4th	34,833	8.33	5th	2 / 27	15 / 81
2020	82,814	8.30	4th	65,397	14.47	3rd	3 / 27	13 / 81
2022	120,972	10.87	3rd	74,696	15.57	3rd	7 / 27	14 / 81
2024	46,518	5.86	4th	15,635	4.00	5th	2 / 27	14 / 81
2026	90,586	7.85	4th	26,282	5.55	4th	3 / 27	12 / 81

==== Presidential ====
Indirect Election	Candidate	First round result			Second round result			Third round result		
Indirect Election	Candidate	Votes	%Votes	Result	Votes	%Votes	Result	Votes	%Votes	Result
1993	Václav Havel	109	63.37	Won	—					
1998	Václav Havel	130	70.65	Runner-up	146	52.3	Won	—		
2003	(Petr Pithart) Jan Sokol	128	46.55	Runner-up	129	48.13	Runner-up	124	46.6	Lost
2008	Václav Klaus	141	50.90	Runner-up	141	52.81	Runner-up	141	55.95	Won

Direct Election	Candidate	First round result			Second round result		
Direct Election	Candidate	Votes	%Votes	Result	Votes	%Votes	Result
2013	Zuzana Roithová	255,045	4.95	6th	supported Karel Schwarzenberg		
2018	Jiří Drahoš	1,369,601	26.60	Runner-up	2,701,206	48.63	Lost
2023 (Note: The SPOLU coalition supported 3 independent candidates for this election.)	Petr Pavel	1,975,056	35.40	Runner-up	3,358,926	58.33	Won
2023	Danuše Nerudová	777,080	13.93	3rd place	supported Petr Pavel		
2023	Pavel Fischer	376,705	6.75	4th place	supported Petr Pavel		

==== European Parliament ====
Election	List leader	Votes	%	Seats	+/–	EP Group
2004	Zuzana Roithová	223,383	9.57 (#4)	2 / 24	New	EPP-ED
2009	Zuzana Roithová	180,451	7.64 (#4)	2 / 22	0	EPP
2014	Pavel Svoboda	150,792	9.95 (#5)	3 / 22	▲1	EPP
2019	Pavel Svoboda	171,723	7.24 (#6)	2 / 21	▼1	EPP
2024 (Note: Run as part of the SPOLU coalition.)	Alexandr Vondra	661,250	22.27 (#2)	1 / 21	▼1	EPP

==== Local elections ====
Year	Vote	Vote %	Seats
1990	8,845,562	11,5	8,083
1994	9,260,542 ▲	7.23 ▼	7,616▼
1998	7,206,346▼	11.18▲	7,119▼
2002	7,728,402▲	9.58▼	6,013▼
2006	6,263,980▼	5.76▼	5,049▼
2010	4,938,960▼	5.47▼	3,738▼
2014	4,865,956▼	4.91▼	3,792▲
2018	5,599,336▲	5.02▲	3,633▼
2022	5,457,419▼	5.08▲	3,252▼
2026	5,206,682▼	4.68▼	2,722▼

==== Regional elections ====
Year	Vote	Vote %	Seats	Places
2000	537,012	22.86	72 / 675	2nd
2004	226,016▼	10.67▼	84 / 675	4th▼
2008	193,911▼	6.65▼	56 / 675	4th
2012	261,724▲	9.87▲	61 / 675	4th
2016	159,610▼	6.30▼	61 / 675	5th▼
2020	252,598▲	9.12▲	53 / 675	5th▼

==== 2020 Czech regional election results ====
Region	Coalition partner	# of overall votes	% of overall vote	Seats			Governance
Region	Coalition partner	# of overall votes	% of overall vote	#	±	Position	Governance
Central Bohemian	STAN	92,903	22.21	2 / 65	▲2	▲5th	STAN–ODS–Pirates–TOP 09+Greens-Voice
South Bohemian	TOP 09	20,798	10.45	4 / 55	Steady	▼6th	ODS–KDU-ČSL+TOP 09–ČSSD–JIH12
Plzeň	ADS and Non-Partisans	7,588	4.36	—N/a	▼2	▼11th	ODS+TOP 09–STAN–Pirates
Karlovy Vary	ODS	5,870	7.35	2 / 45	▲1	▲8th	STAN+TOP 09-Pirates-ODS+KDU ČSL-Local movements
Ústí nad Labem	ODS	24,739	12.37	1 / 55	▲1	▲8th	ANO–ODS–TOP 09+Greens
Liberec	TOP 09	5,328	3.83	—N/a	Steady	▲7th	Mayors for Liberec Region–Pirates–ODS
Hradec Králové	VPM and Non-Partisans	14,738	8.32	4 / 45	Steady	▼5th	ODS+STAN+VČ–KDU-ČSL–Pirates–TOP 09+HDK
Pardubice	SNK-ED and Non-Partisans	22,280	13.41	4 / 45	▼1	▼5th	ČSSD–ODS+TOP 09–KDU-ČSL–STAN
Vysočina	—N/a	19,082	11.96	6 / 45	▼1	3rd	ODS+STO–Pirates–KDU-ČSL–ČSSD–STAN
South Moravian	—N/a	56,423	15.54	11 / 65	Steady	2nd	KDU-ČSL–Pirates–ODS–STAN
Olomouc	TOP 09 and Greens	34,519	18.43	6 / 55	▼1	4th	STAN+Pirates–KDU-ČSL+TOP 09–ODS
Zlín	—N/a	35,782	18.62	9 / 45	▼3	▼2nd	ANO–Pirates–ODS–ČSSD
Moravian-Silesian	—N/a	30,190	9.57	7 / 65	▼1	4th	ANO–ODS+TOP 09–KDU-ČSL–ČSSD
