= Moravian-Silesian Christian Social Party in Moravia =

Moravian-Silesian Christian Social Party in Moravia Moravsko-slezská křesťansko-sociální strana na Moravě
- Leader: Jan Šrámek
- Founded: 1899
- Dissolved: 1919
- Merged into: Czechoslovak People's Party
- Ideology: Catholic social teaching Corporatism
- Political position: Centre to centre-left
- Religion: Catholicism

The Moravian-Silesian Christian Social Party in Moravia (Czech: Moravsko-slezská křesťansko-sociální strana na Moravě), was a Czech Christian-social political party in Moravia and Austrian Silesia during times of Austria-Hungary. After its foundation in 1889, party remained in close cooperation with the older Catholic National Party in Moravia. Although initially viewed as Moravian–Czech country organization of Austrian Christian Social Party, party was established independently. In 1908 party organization also expanded into Lower and Upper Austria.
