= Jan Šrámek =

Czech politician (1870-1956)

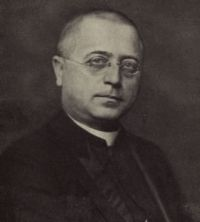

Prime Minister of Czechoslovakia
- In exile 21 July 1940 – 5 April 1945
- President: Edvard Beneš
- Preceded by: Rudolf Beran
- Succeeded by: Zdeněk Fierlinger

Personal details
- Born: 11 August 1870 Grygov, Austria-Hungary
- Died: 22 April 1956 (aged 85) Prague, Czechoslovakia
- Party: Czechoslovak People's Party
- Education: Palacký University, Olomouc

Jan Šrámek (11 August 1870 – 22 April 1956) was the prime minister of the Czechoslovak government-in-exile from 21 July 1940 to 5 April 1945. He was the first chairman of the Czechoslovak People's Party and was a Monsignor in the Catholic church.

From 1945 Czechoslovakia was ruled by the National Front, dominated by the Communist Party of Czechoslovakia, and including Šrámek's People's Party. Šrámek and the rest of his coalition worried about the increasing role of the Communist Party. In 1947, the popular support for the Communists started to diminish. To consolidate power, the Communists carried out a coup in February 1948. Šrámek had to resign as the chairman of the People's Party. His successor, Rostislav Petr, and Josef Plojhar, a "strong man" in the People's Party, were fellow travelers who supported unconditional collaboration with the Communists.

Šrámek held several titles & political party memberships during his lifetime:

- Founder & chairman of the Christian Social Party (1899);
- Member of the Moravian Provincial Assembly (1906);
- Member of the Reichsrat (1907);
- Member of the National Committee (1916);
- Member of the Czechoslovak National Committee (1917);
- Member of the Moravian National Committee (1918);
- Member of the National Assembly (1918);
- Minister of multiple departments in the Czechoslovak government (1921);
- Chairman of the Czechoslovak People's Party (1919-1938, 1945-1948);
- Vice-Chairman of the Czechoslovak National Committee in Paris (1939-1940);
- Chairman of the Czechoslovak government in exile (1940-1945);
- Prime Minister of the Czechoslovak government in exile (1945-1948).
