= Catholic-National Conservative Party in Bohemia =

Catholic-National Conservative Party in Bohemia Katolicko-národně konzervativní strana v Čechách
- Secretary: Jan Dostálek
- Founded: 1911
- Dissolved: 1919
- Split from: Party of Catholic People
- Merged into: Czechoslovak People's Party
- Ideology: Religious conservatism Political Catholicism; Monarchism
- Political position: Right-wing
- Sister party (Moravia): Catholic-National Conservative Party in Moravia

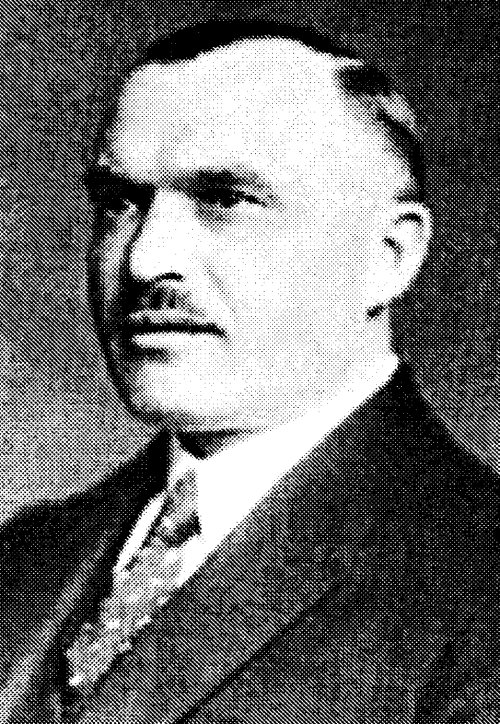
Jan Dostálek

The Catholic-National Conservative Party in Bohemia (Czech: Katolicko-národně konzervativní strana v Čechách), was a Czech catholic political party in Bohemia. Party was founded by former members of the Party of Catholic People around Jan Dostálek. Party operated in close relationship as a counterpart of the Catholic-National Conservative Party in Moravia. On political congress on 5–6 January 1919, party merged into newly established Czechoslovak People's Party.
