= Czech Christian Social Party in the Kingdom of Bohemia =

Defunct Czech political party

Czech Christian Social Party in the Kingdom of Bohemia Česká křesťansko-sociální strana v království Českém
- Leader: Rudolf Horský; Václav Myslivec
- Founded: 1906
- Dissolved: 1919
- Merger of: Catholic National Party in the Kingdom of Bohemia, Christian Social Party in Bohemia, Christian Social People's Party in Bohemia
- Merged into: Czechoslovak People's Party
- Ideology: Political Catholicism; Catholic social teaching Social conservatism
- Political position: Centre

The Czech Christian Social Party in the Kingdom of Bohemia (Czech: Česká křesťansko-sociální strana v království Českém), before 1910 known as Party of Catholic People (Czech: Strana katolického lidu), was a Czech Christian-social political party in Bohemia during times of Austria-Hungary. The party was founded in 1910 as merger of three political parties: the Catholic National Party in the Kingdom of Bohemia, the Christian Social Party in Bohemia, and the Christian Social People's Party in Bohemia under the name Party of Catholic People. The party was inspired by the Centre Party in Germany and Christian Social Party in Austria.

The party cooperated with its older counterpart, the Moravian-Silesian Christian Social Party in Moravia.
