= Catholic-National Conservative Party in Moravia =

Catholic-National Conservative Party in Moravia Katolicko-národně konzervativní strana na Moravě
- Leader: Mořic Hruban
- Founded: 14 September 1896
- Dissolved: 3 January 1919
- Split from: Moravian National Party (Old Czech Party)
- Merged into: Czechoslovak People's Party
- Ideology: Religious conservatism Political Catholicism; Monarchism
- Political position: Right-wing
- Sister party (Bohemia): Catholic-National Conservative Party in Bohemia

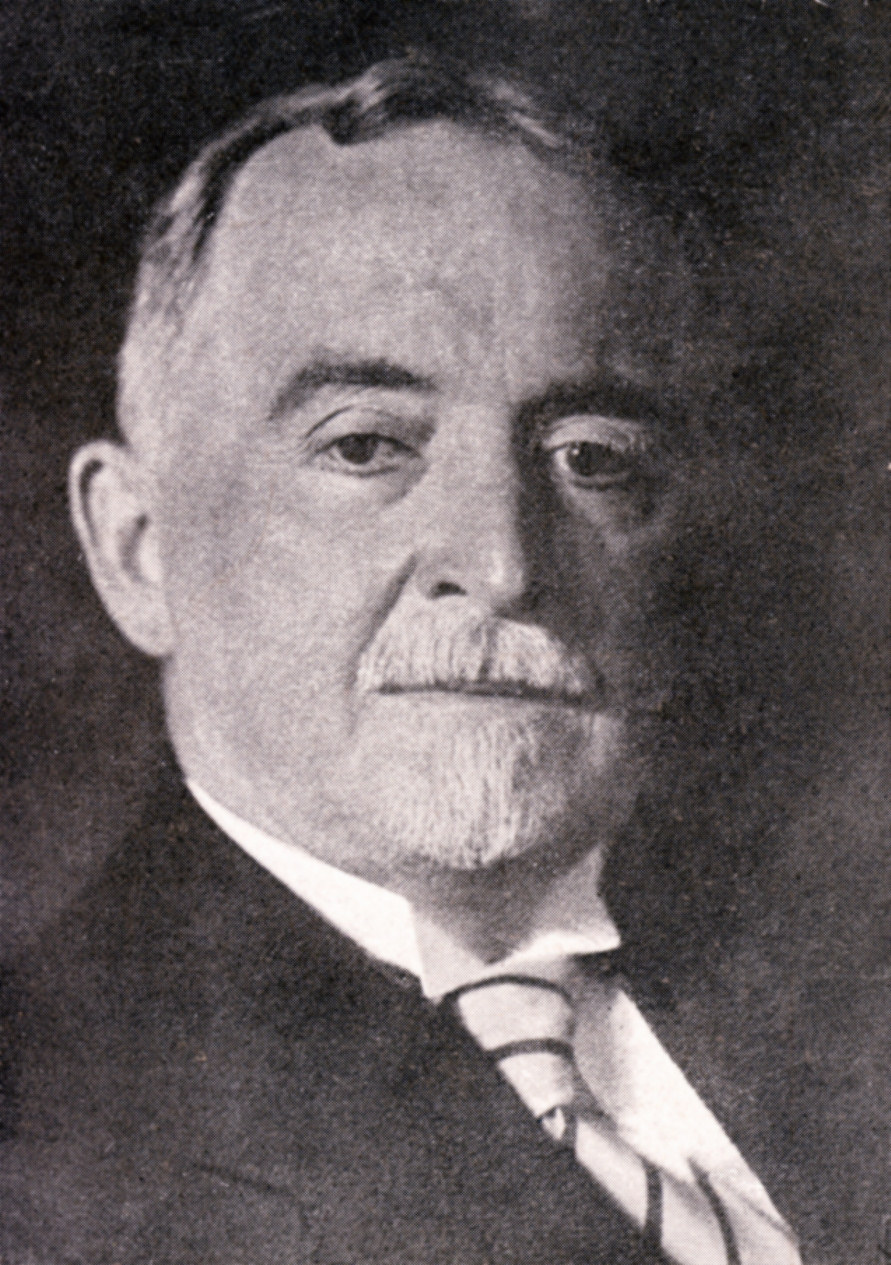
Mořic Hruban

The Catholic-National Conservative Party in Moravia (Czech: Katolicko-národně konzervativní strana na Moravě), was a Czech catholic political party in Moravia. Party was founded by Mořic Hruban, who before cooperated with the Old Czech Party. Party operated in close relationship as a counterpart of the Catholic-National Conservative Party in Bohemia. On political congress on 26 January 1919 in Brno, party merged into newly established Czechoslovak People's Party.
