= Karl Maria Alexander von Auersperg =

Austrian politician

His Serene Highness Karl von Auersperg 9th Prince of Auersperg
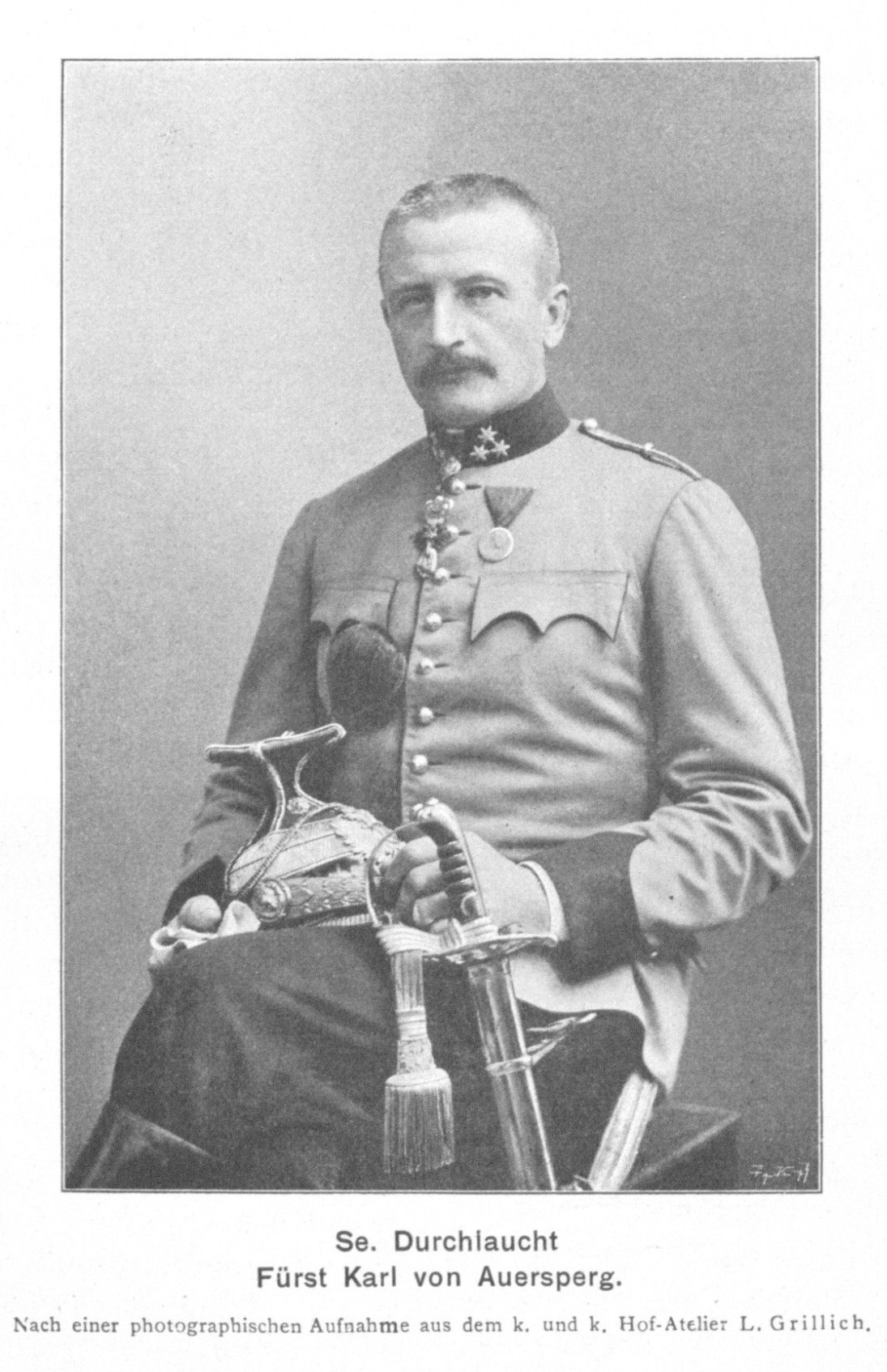
- Auersperg in 1902

Vice President of the Austrian House of Lords
- In office 1897–1907
- Monarch: Franz Joseph I
- Preceded by: Alfred III, Prince of Windisch-Grätz
- Succeeded by: Maximilian Egon II, Prince of Fürstenberg

Member of the Austrian House of Deputies
- In office 1907–1911
- Constituency: Gottschee

Personal details
- Born: February 26, 1859 Vienna, Austrian Empire
- Died: October 19, 1927 (aged 68) Schloss Goldegg, Austria
- Resting place: Auersperg Mausoleum, Losensteinleithen
- Party: Constitutional Party; Chairman: 1897–1907
- Spouse: Countess Eleonore von Breunner-Enkevoirth
- Parents: Prince Adolf of Auersperg (father); Countess Johanna Festetics de Tolna (mother)
- Education: German University in Prague
- Occupation: Landowner, politician, Privy Councilor
- Awards: Order of the Golden Fleece
- Military career
- Allegiance: Austro-Hungarian Empire
- Service years: World War I
- Rank: Colonel of the Reserve

Karl Maria Alexander, 9th Prince of Auersperg, Duke of Gottschee (German: Karl Maria Alexander Fürst von Auersperg, Herzog von Gottschee 26 February 1859 in Vienna – 19 October 1927 in Goldegg; from 1919 Karl Maria Alexander Auersperg) was an Austrian statesman who served as vice president of the Austrian House of Lords and leader of the Constitutional Party from 1897 to 1907. He subsequently served as a member of the House of Deputies until 1911.

== Biography ==
Auersperg was heir to the influential mediatized House of Auersperg. His father, Prince Adolf, was minister-president of Austria. The same position was held by his uncle, Prince Karl Wilhelm.

Auersperg was educated in Vienna and studied law at the University of Prague. He served as a cavalry officer in the 14th Dragoons regiment and later as Colonel (Oberst) of the Reserve in the 13th Landwehr division during World War I. He began his political career as a member of the Austrian House of Lords (Herrenhaus) in 1890, where he became vice president and leader of the Constitutional Party from 1897 to 1907. From 1894 to 1902, Auersperg was a member of the Landtag of Lower Austria as the representative of the constitutionally loyal landowners (Verfassungstreuer Großgrundbesitz).

A major figure in the imperial economy, Auersperg served as a leading representative of agrarian and forestry interests. He held the presidency of the Imperial and Royal Agricultural Society in Vienna from 1897 to 1908 and led the Austrian Imperial Forestry Association for nearly two decades (1902–1919). Additionally, he chaired the Austrian Central Office for the Protection of Agricultural and Forestry Interests (1905–1907). Auersperg’s prominence in these sectors led to his appointment as the official representative of Austrian forestry at Emperor Franz Joseph’s Golden Jubilee in 1898 and the 1900 Paris Exposition.

Upon becoming head of the princely branch of the House of Auersperg in 1890, he also assumed the title of Duke of Gottschee. Gottschee was a German ethnolinguistics enclave within the Slovene region of Carniola. The county of Gottschee had been acquired by the Auerspergs in 1641 and was raised to a titular dukedom by Leopold II, Holy Roman Emperor, in 1791. Auersperg was a staunch supporter of the Gottschee Germans (Gottscheers) and after universal suffrage was passed in 1907, he was elected as the first representative of Gottschee in the House of Deputies, until 1911. In this position he used his political influence on initiatives like the establishment of an upper secondary school (Obergymnasium). As a private citizen, he finalized construction of the Lower Carniolan railway (Unterkrainer Bahn), which had been planned by his uncle, and he was a major benefactor of churches, schools and hospitals in the region.

When the Austro-Hungarian Empire was dissolved in 1918 and Gottschee became part of the newly created State of Slovenes, Croats and Serbs (later the Kingdom of Yugoslavia), Auersperg retained his Austrian citizenship and chose not to take up Yugoslavian citizenship. His Austrian patriotism and support of the Gottschee Germans placed him at odds with the new regime. His estates were subsequently subject to agrarian reforms that reduced his forestry land in the region from an initial 23 thousand hectares (~57 thousand acres) to around five thousand hectares (~12 thousand acres). He was however allowed to keep his castles in Gottschee and Seisenberg.

== Personal life ==
Auersperg’s central estate in Bohemia was Vlašim, which was often visited by Crown Prince Rudolf, who was a friend of his since childhood. His residence in Prague was the Auersperg Palace, an early Baroque building opposite Wallenstein Palace in Malá Strana. In 1904, the palace was bought from the Auersperg family by the Land Committee of the Kingdom of Bohemia and utilized by state authorities throughout the 20th century. Following the Velvet Revolution, it was integrated into the parliamentary seat of the Chamber of Deputies.

Auersperg's primary seats in Austria were Schloss Goldegg in Lower Austria, where he died in 1927, and Schloss Losensteinleiten in Upper Austria, where he is interred in a family mausoleum. He also held the estate of Belaj in Istria.

In 1885, Auersperg married Countess Eleonore von Breunner-Enkevoirth, daughter of Count August von Breunner-Enkevoirth. They had five children:

- Prince Adolf of Auersperg (1886–1923); married in 1914 to Countess Gabrielle von Clam und Gallas, and had issue. Their son, Karl-Adolf, 10th Prince of Auersperg, married Countess Feodore of Solms-Baruth, daughter of Friedrich III, Prince zu Solms-Baruth and Princess Adelaide of Schleswig-Holstein-Sonderburg-Glücksburg.
- Princess Agathe of Auersperg (1888–1973); married in 1913 to Alexander, Prince of Schönburg-Hartenstein, son of Alois, Prince of Schönburg-Hartenstein and Countess Johanna of Colloredo-Mannsfeld.
- Princess Johanna of Auersperg (1890–1967); married in 1917 to Count Rudolf of Meran, son of Franz, Count of Meran and Countess Theresia von Lamberg (1836–1913).
- Princess Eleonore of Auersperg (1892–1967); married in 1919 to Erwin Wallner.
- Prince Karl of Auersperg-Breunner (1895–1980); married in 1927 to Countess Henriette of Meran, daughter of Count Franz Peter of Meran and Princess Marie Johanna of Liechtenstein. In 1929, Karl was authorized by the Hungarian government to assume the name Auersperg-Breunner following his adoption by his maternal aunt, Countess Ernestine Coudenhove (born Countess Breunner), who was childless. This legal union of name (Namensvereinigung) ensured the continuation of the Breunner name within the Auersperg family.

== Honours ==
- Knight of the Golden Fleece, 1900 (Austria-Hungary)

== Gallery ==
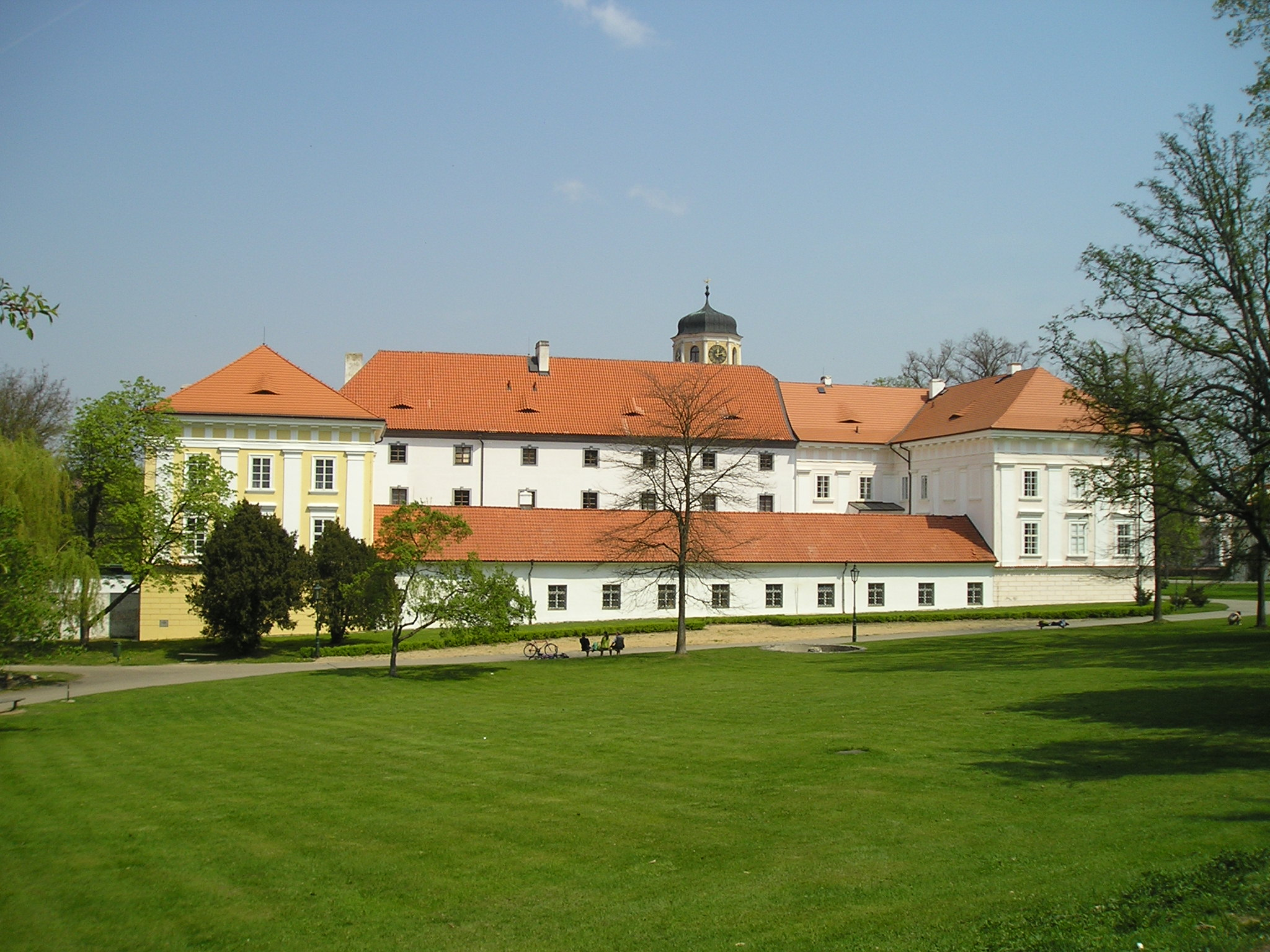
Schloss Vlašim, Bohemia

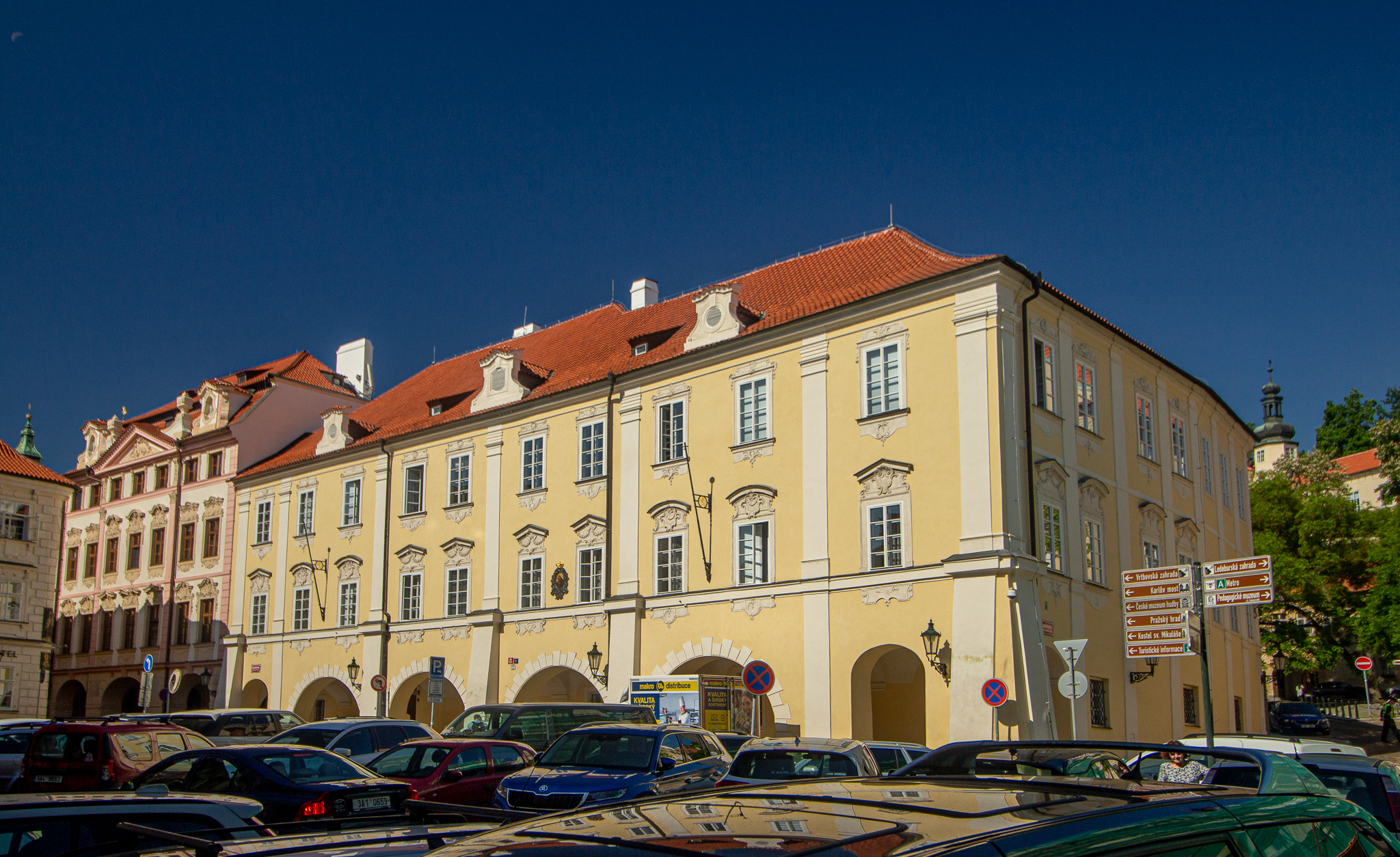
Auersperg Palace, Prague

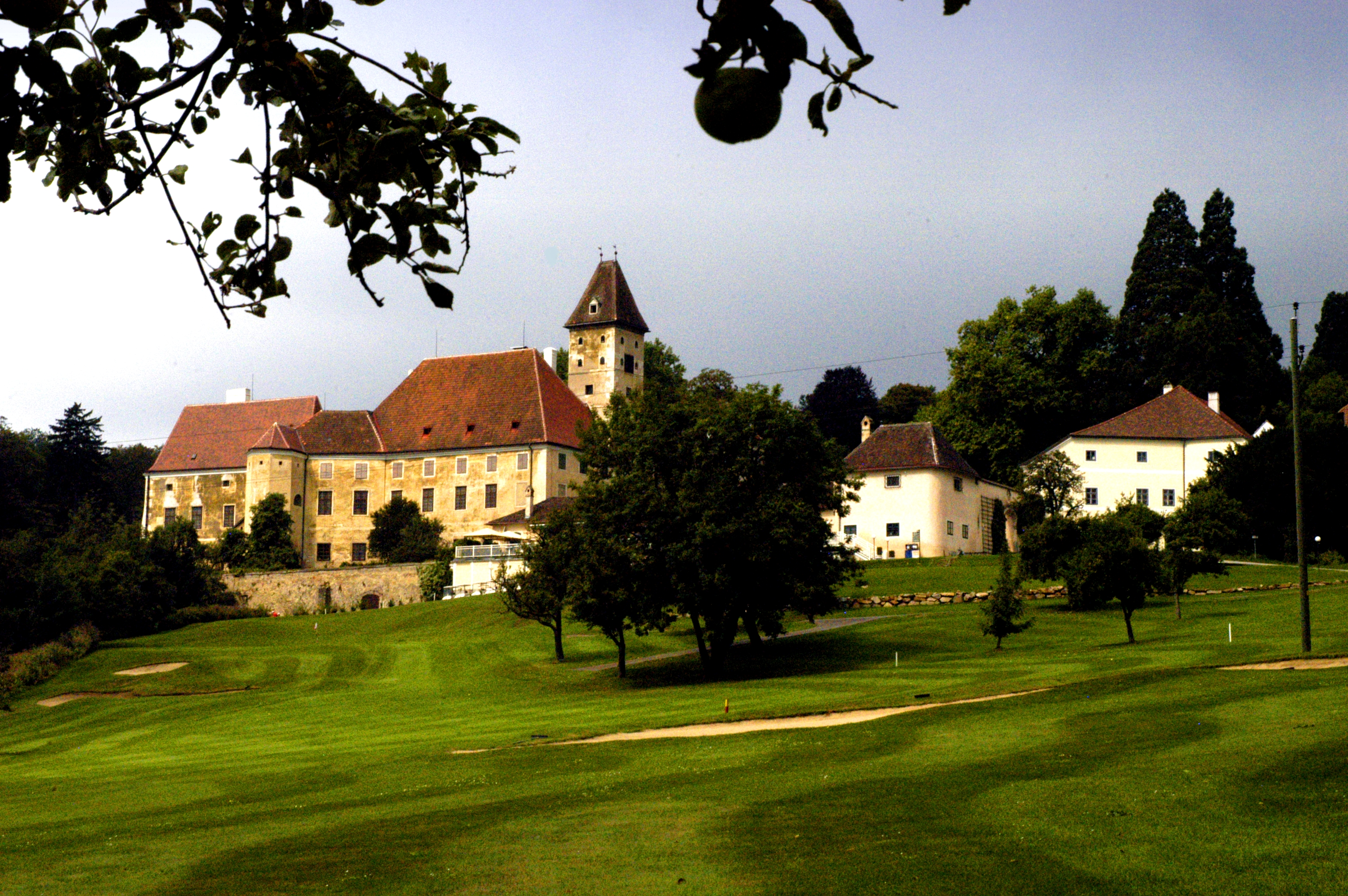
Schloss Goldegg, Lower Austria

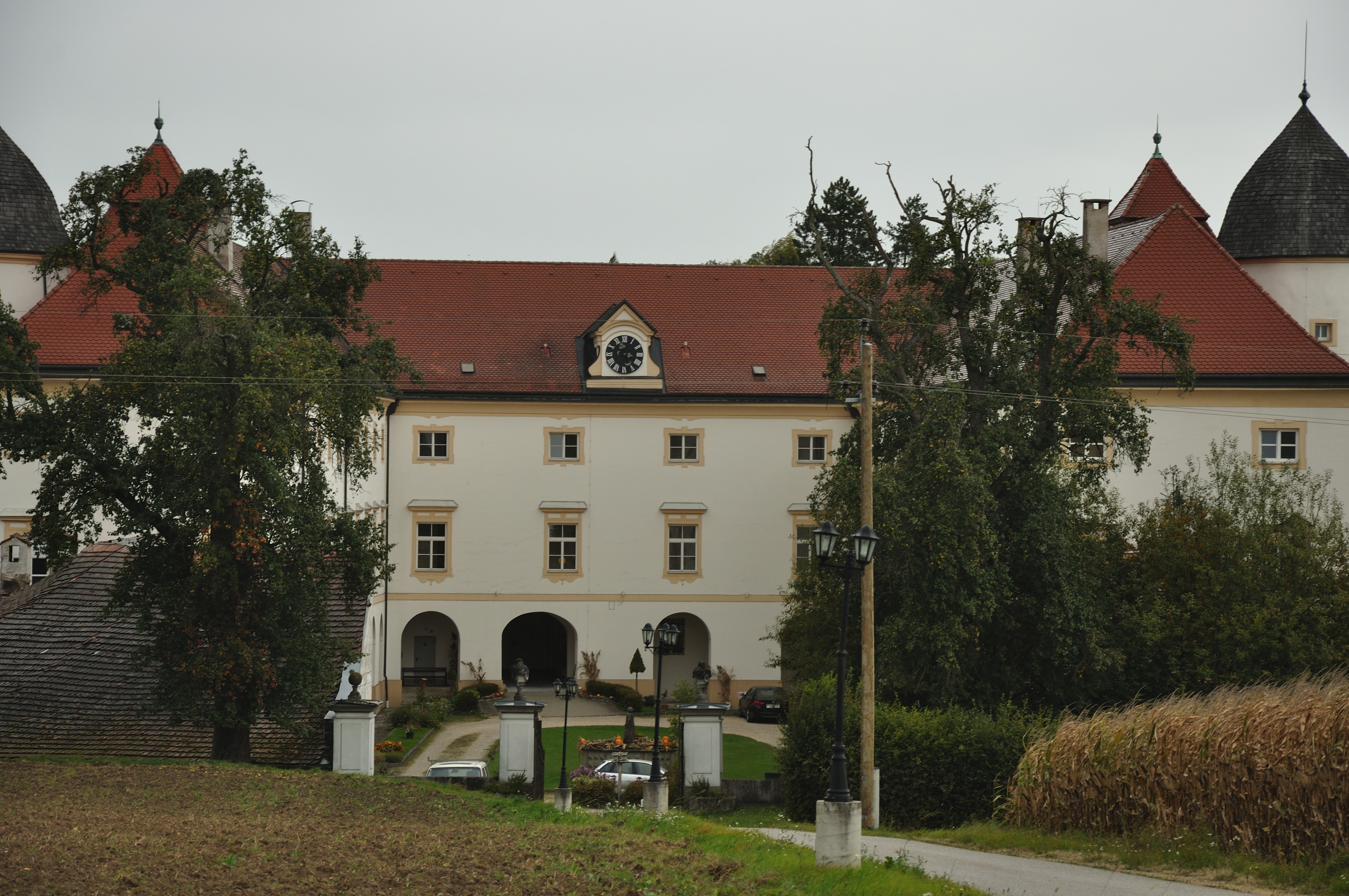
Schloss Losensteinleithen, Upper Austria

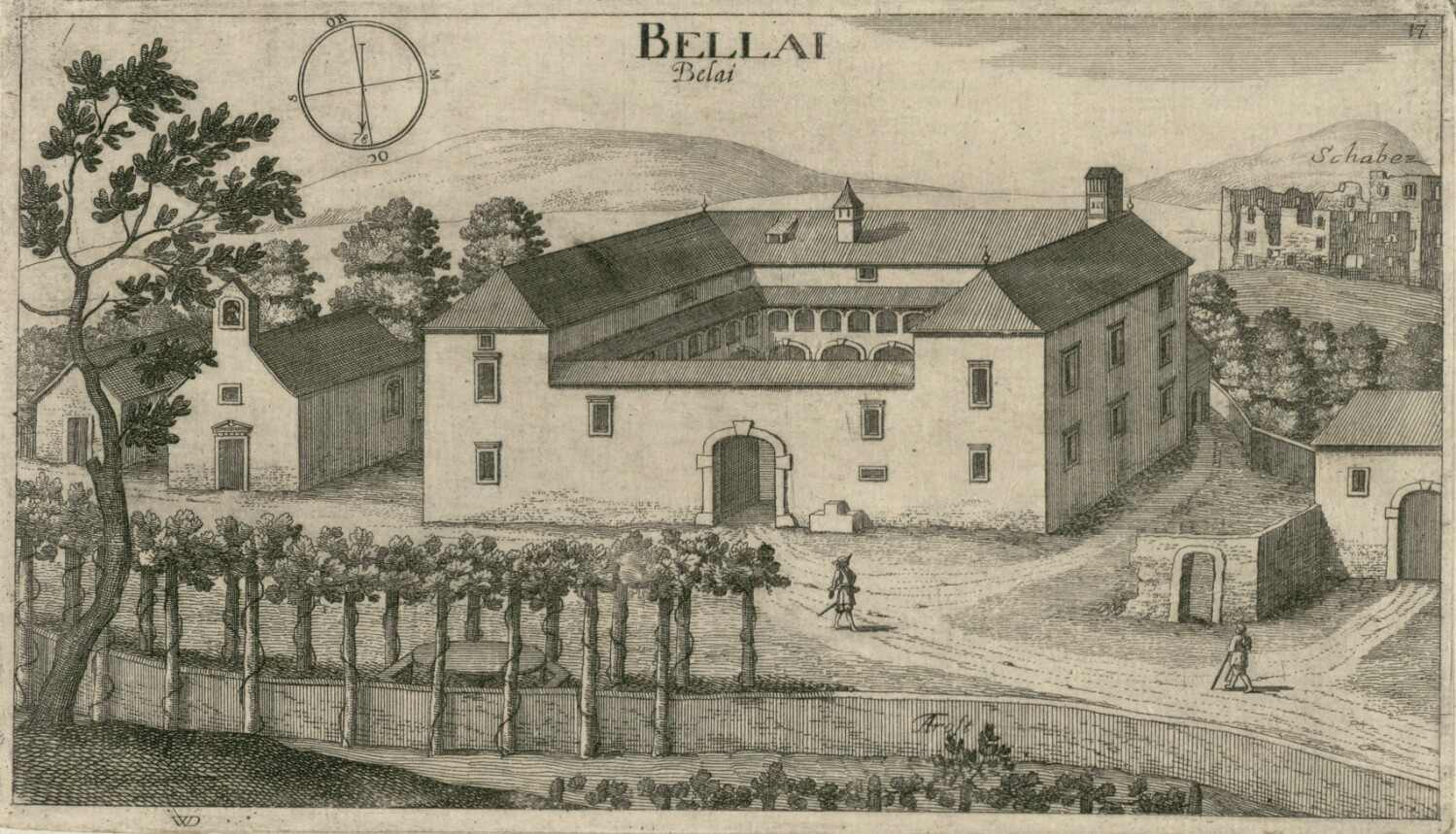
Schloss Belaj, Istria

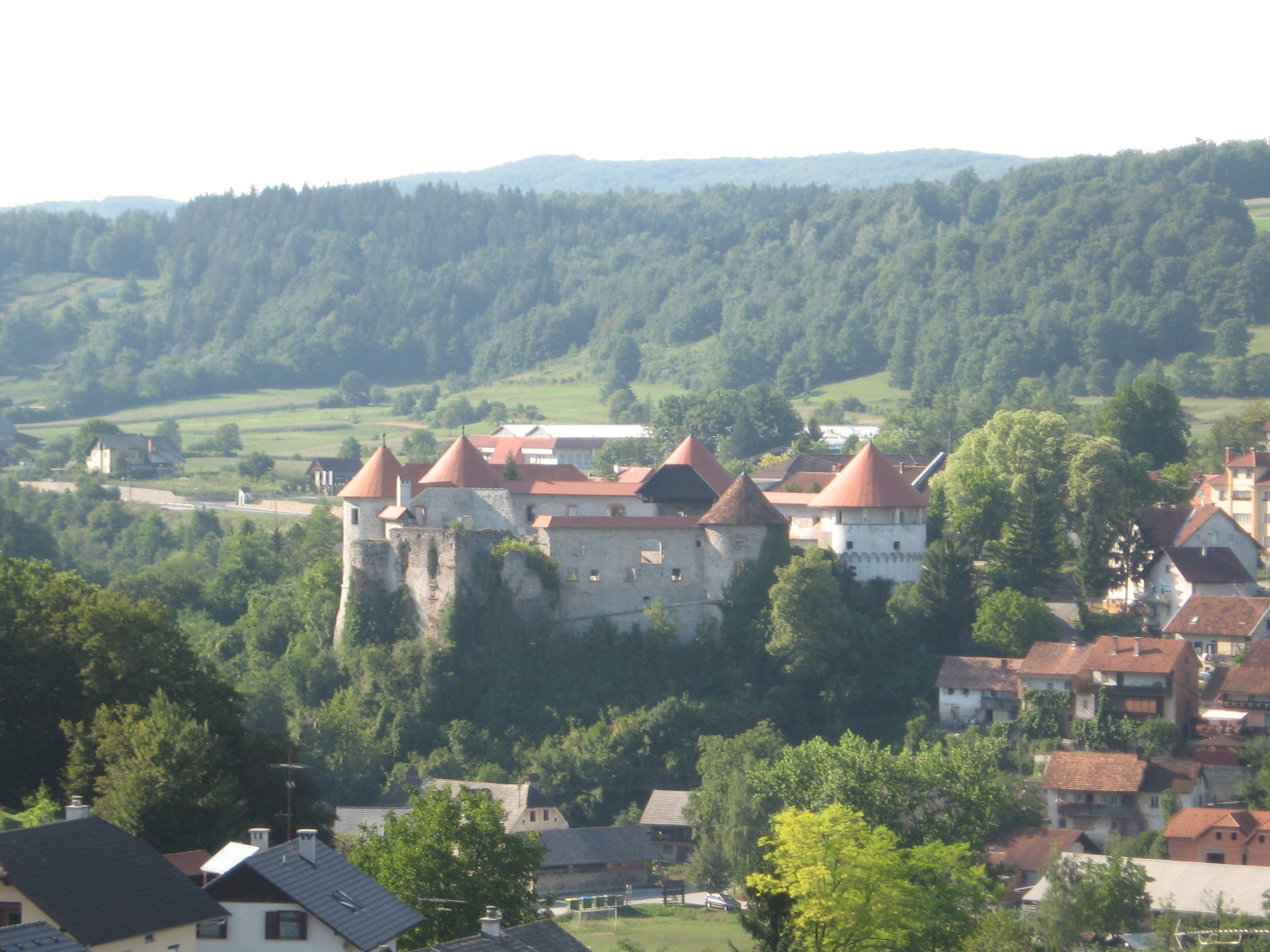
Schloss Seisenberg, Lower Carniola

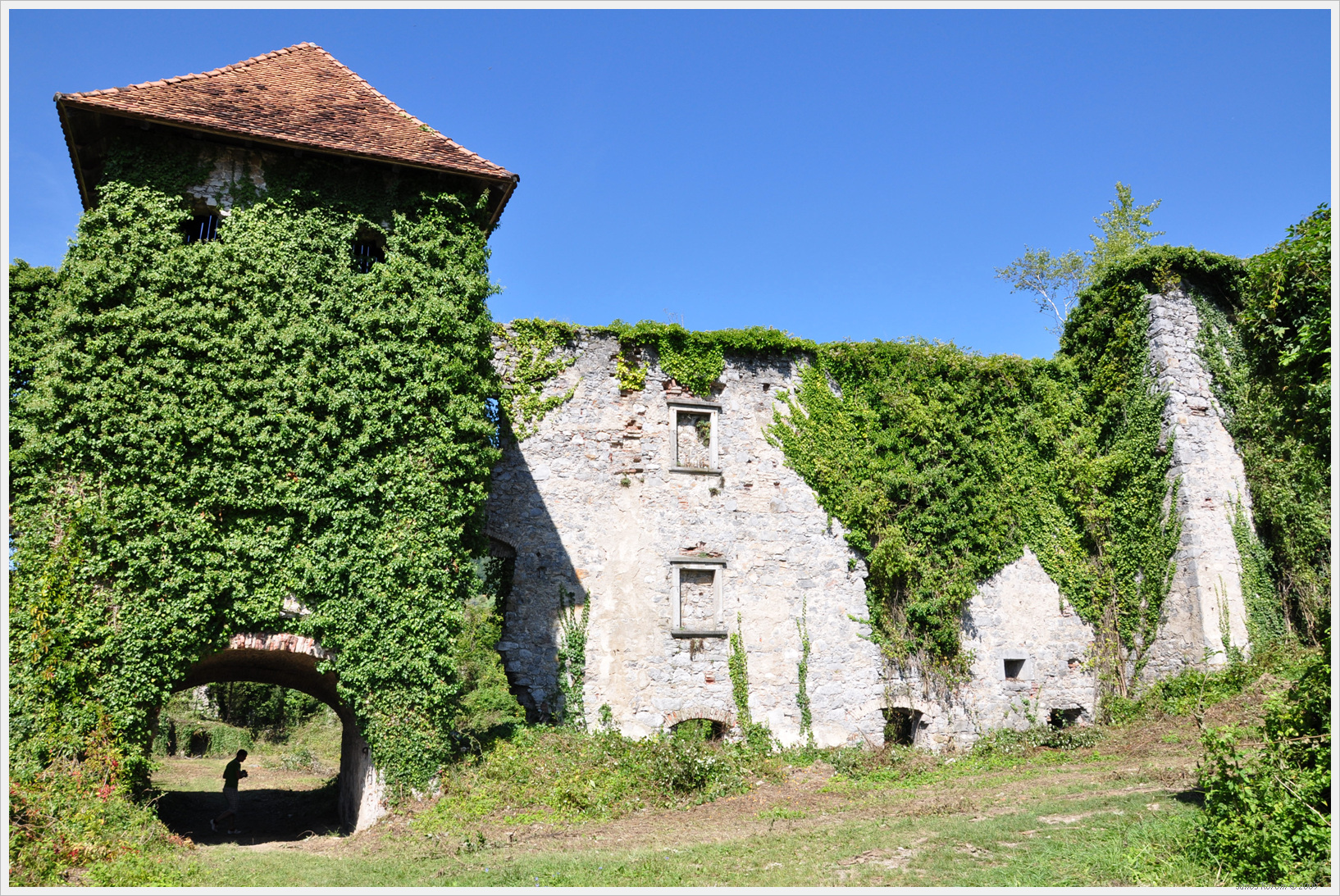
Schloss Ainöd, Lower Carniola

Political offices
Preceded by Alfred III, Prince of Windisch-Grätz	Vice President of Austrian House of Lords; 1897–1907	Succeeded by Maximilian Egon II, Prince of Fürstenberg
Titles of nobility
Preceded by Karl, 8th Prince	Prince of Auersperg; 1890–1927	Succeeded by Karl Adolf, 10th Prince
