= Prince Adolf of Auersperg =

Austrian politician (1821–1885)

His Serene Highness Prince Adolf of Auersperg
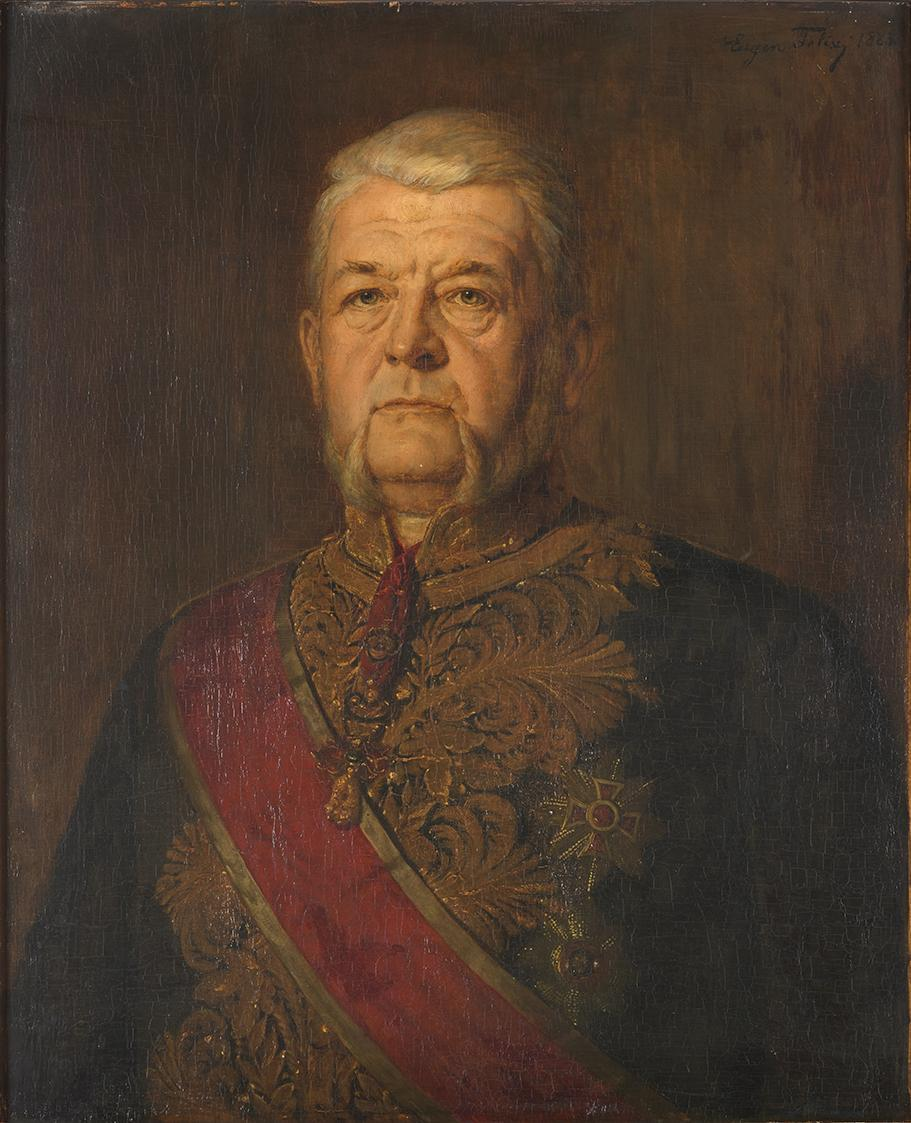
- Portrait by Eugen Felix, 1883

Minister-President of Austria
- In office 25 November 1871 – 15 February 1879
- Monarch: Franz Joseph I of Austria
- Preceded by: Baron Ludwig von Holzgethan
- Succeeded by: Karl von Stremayr

Minister of the Interior
- In office 5 July 1878 – 15 February 1879
- Preceded by: Josef Lasser von Zollheim
- Succeeded by: Karl von Stremayr

Supreme Marshal of Bohemia
- In office 1867–1870
- Preceded by: Count Edmund von Hartig
- Succeeded by: Count Albert von Nostitz-Rieneck
Other offices
Provincial President of Salzburg
In office
1870–1871
President of the Supreme Audit Office
In office
1879–1885
Member of the Austrian House of Lords
In office
1869–1885

Personal details
- Born: 21 July 1821 Vlašim, Bohemia, Austrian Empire
- Died: 5 January 1885 (aged 63) Goldegg Castle, Neidling, Lower Austria, Austria-Hungary
- Resting place: Auersperg Mausoleum, Losensteinleithen
- Party: Constitutional Party
- Spouse(s): Aloise Freiin Mladota von Solopisk (m. 1845; died 1849) Countess Johanna Festetics de Tolna (m. 1857; died 1884)
- Children: 5
- Parents: Wilhelm II, 7th Prince of Auersperg (father); Frederika von Lenthe (mother)
- Education: University of Prague
- Awards: Order of the Golden Fleece; Grand Cross of the Order of Saint Stephen
- Military career
- Service years: 1841–1849; 1850–1859
- Rank: Major ad honores
- Unit: Austro-Hungarian Army

Prince Adolf of Auersperg (German: Adolf Wilhelm Daniel Fürst von Auersperg; 21 July 1821 – 5 January 1885) was an Austrian statesman who served as the Minister-President of Cisleithania from 1871 to 1879. A leading figure of the Constitutional Party, his premiership marked the peak of liberal political influence in the dual monarchy. Before his national leadership, he served as the Supreme Marshal of Bohemia and the Provincial President of Salzburg.

== Biography ==
Prince Adolf was the son of Wilhelm II of Auersperg, and his second wife, Friederike Luise Wilhelmine Henriette von Lenthe. His paternal grandparents were Wilhelm I of Auersperg and Leopoldine von Waldstein-Wartenberg. His maternal grandparents were Carl Levin Otto von Lenthe and Henriette Friederike Wilhelmine Sophie Bennigsen von Banteln (a daughter of the Russian general Count Levin August von Bennigsen).

After studying law, Auersperg served as an imperial cavalry officer for 14 years, reaching the rank of major in Prince Eugene's Dragoons regiment. He entered political life in 1867 as a member of the Bohemian Landtag (provincial assembly), representing the large land owners as a member of the Constitutional Great Lords Party (Verfassungstreuer Großgrundbesitz). Ten months later, on the resignation of Count Hartig, he was appointed Supreme Marshal of the Kingdom of Bohemia, continuing in that office until 1870. In January 1869, he was nominated a life member of the Upper Chamber of the Austrian Reichsrat, in which he played a prominent role.

Auersperg served as the provincial president of Salzburg from 1870 to 1871, where he established himself as a staunch supporter of the constitution. In recognition of his service, Auerspergstraße in central Salzburg was named after him in 1873. During the period of Anschluss (1938–1945), the street was renamed Straße der SA due to anti-aristocratic sentiment, but it was reverted to its original name immediately following the restoration of Austrian sovereignty in 1945.

In 1871, Auersperg succeeded Count Karl Sigmund von Hohenwart Minister-President for the western half of the empire (Cisleithania). His ministry was notable for enacting significant electoral reforms in 1873, which secured direct elections to the lower chamber of the Reichsrat and strengthened the political entente with Hungary. However, intraparty controversies regarding the occupation of Bosnia eventually led to his resignation in 1879. His departure marked the end of German liberalism in Austrian imperial politics. After leaving office, he served as President of the Supreme Audit Office until his death in 1885.

== Family ==
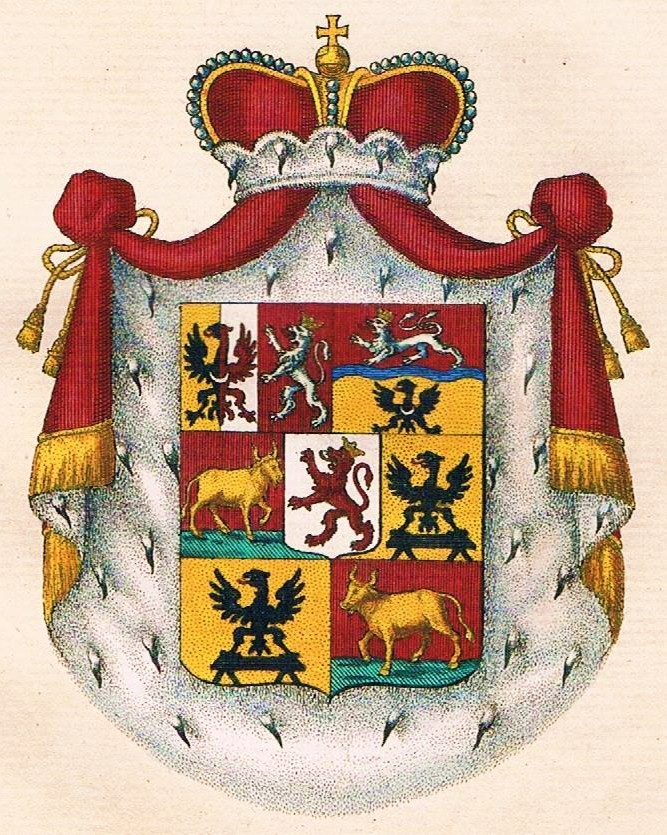
Coat of Arms of the Princely House of Auersperg

Adolf's brother, Karl, 8th Prince of Auersperg, also served as Minister-President of Austria and as the first President of the Austrian House of Lords (Herrenhaus). His other siblings were Aglae (1812–1899), Wilhelmine (1813–1886), Alexander (1818–1866) and Leopoldine (1820–1821).

Adolf was married twice. His first marriage was in 1845 to Baroness Aloysia Johanna Mladota von Solopisk (1820–1849), daughter of Baron Adalbert Mladota von Solopisk and Baroness Franziska Schirndinger von Schirnding. The marriage remained childless until her death in 1849.

In 1857, he married his second wife, Countess Johanna Festetics von Tolna (1830–1884), daughter of Count Ernst Johann Wilhelm Festetics von Tolna and Baroness Johanna Clara Maria Josepha Kotz von Dobrz. They had five children:

- Karl (1859–1927), who succeeded his uncle as the 9th Prince. He was married in 1885 to Countess Eleonore von Breunner-Enkevoirth (1864–1920), and had issue.
- Princess Johanna of Auersperg (1860–1922); married in 1885 to Alain, Prince of Rohan, and had issue.
- Princess Ernestine of Auersperg (1862–1935); remained unmarried.
- Princess Aglae Franziska of Auersperg (1868–1919); married in 1892 to Count Ferdinand Vincent Kinsky, and had issue. Their granddaughter, Countess Marie Kinsky, was the wife of Hans-Adam II, Prince of Liechtenstein.
- Prince Franz of Auersperg (1869–1918); married in 1899 to Florence Elsworth Hazard, without issue.

== Honours ==
- Grand Cross of St. Stephen, 1873 (Austrian Empire)
- Knight of the Golden Fleece, 1878 (Austrian Empire)

== Gallery ==
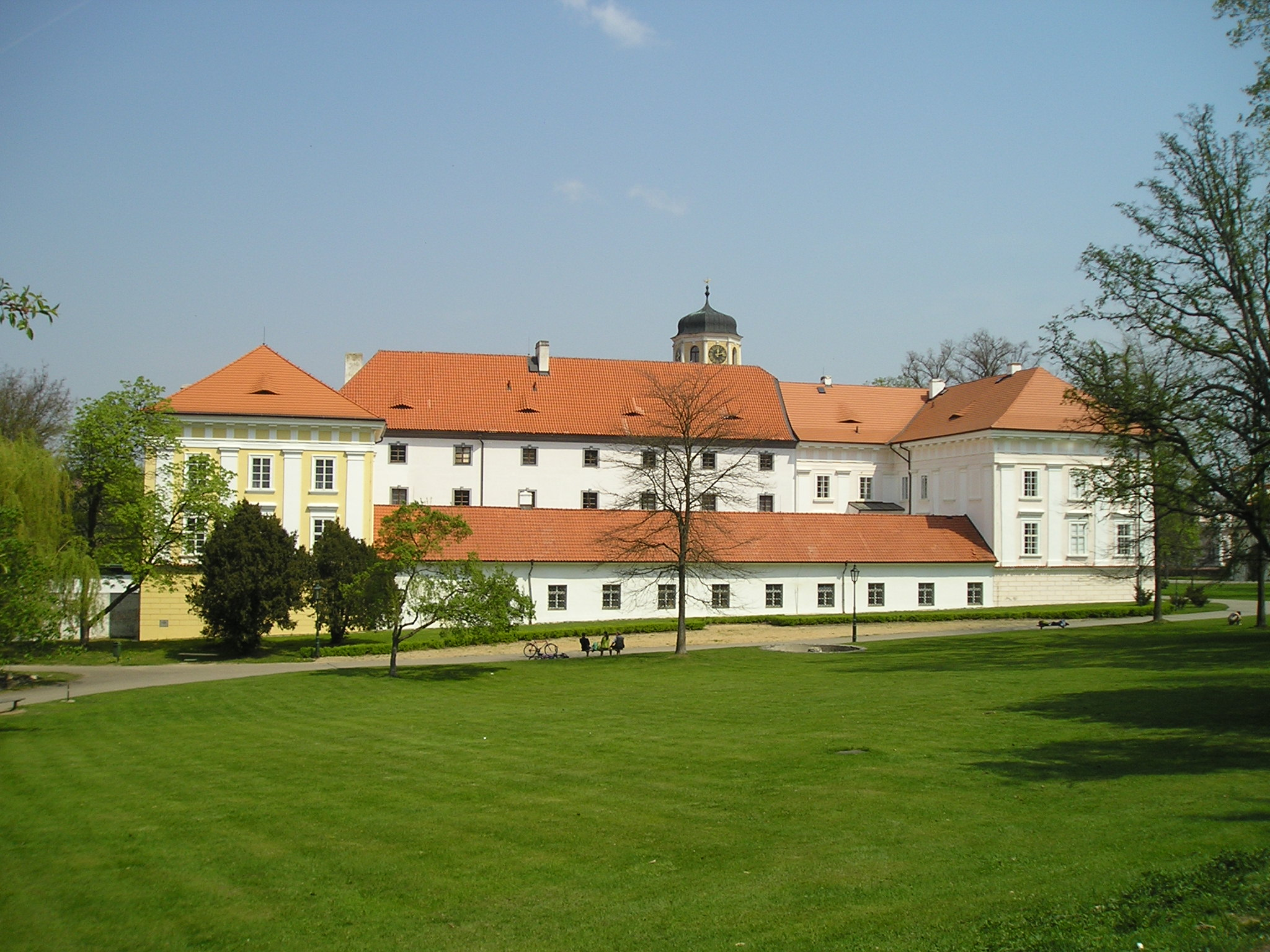
Schloss Vlašim

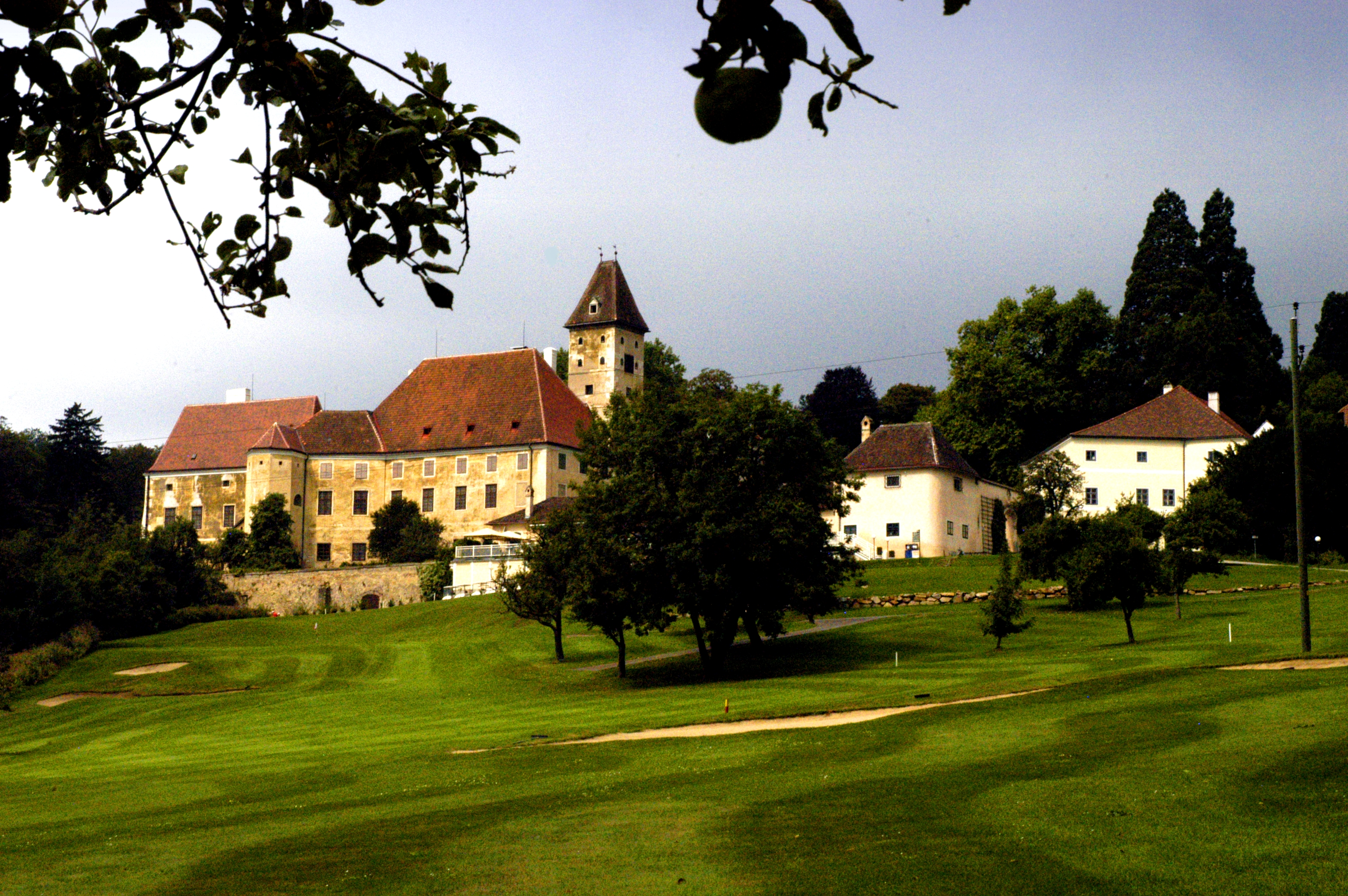
Schloss Goldegg

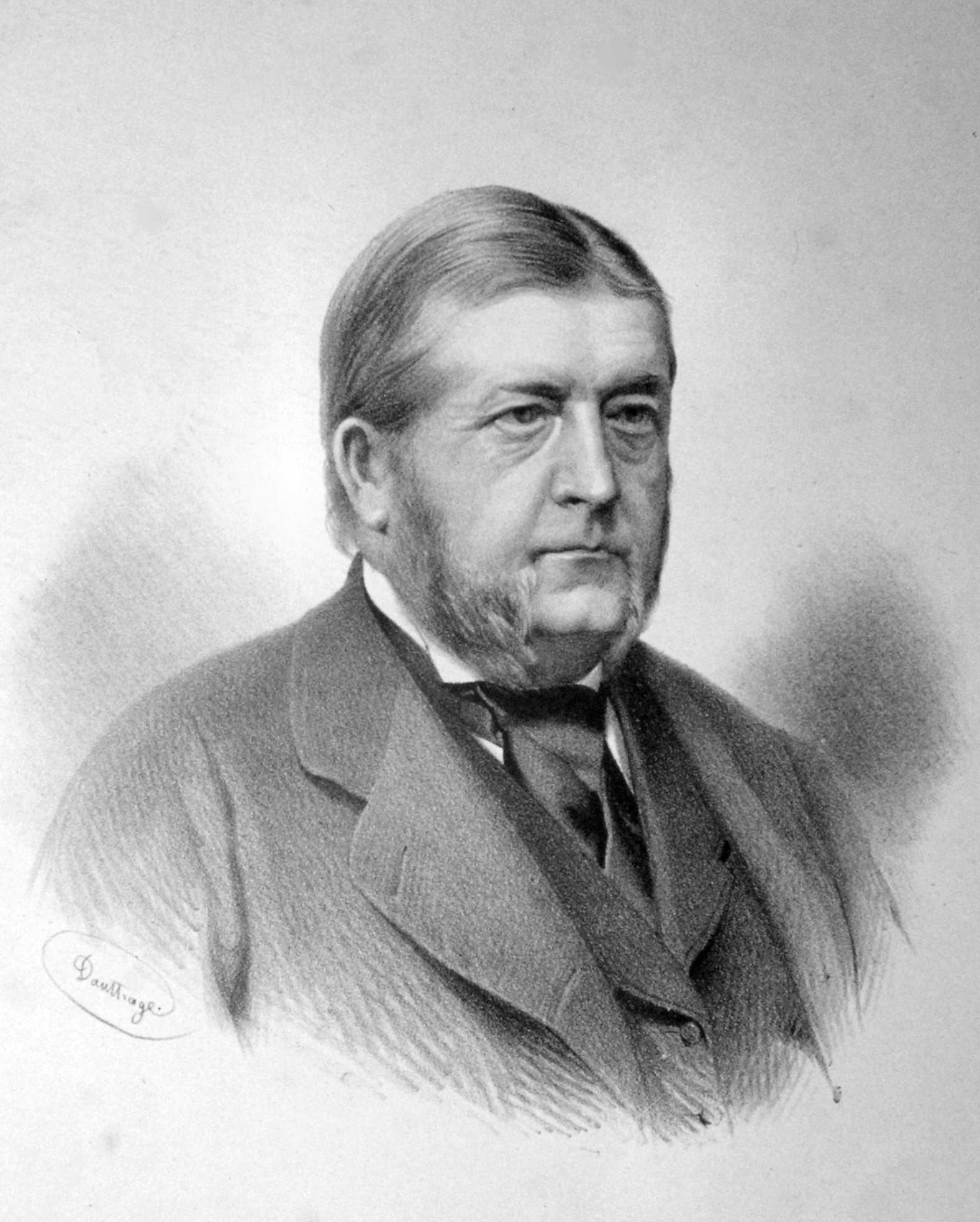
Lithography by Adolf Dauthage

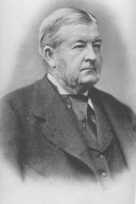
Photograph of Prince Adolf

== Bibliography ==
- Gilman, D. C.; Peck, H. T.; Colby, F. M., eds. (1905). "Auersperg, Adolf Wilhelm Daniel" . New International Encyclopedia (1st ed.). New York: Dodd, Mead.
- Rines, George Edwin, ed. (1920). "Auersperg, Adolf Wilhelm Daniel" . Encyclopedia Americana.

Political offices
Preceded by Ludwig Freiherr von Holzgethan	Minister-President of Cisleithania; 1871–1879	Succeeded by Karl Ritter von Stremayr
