= Hanuš of Lipá =

Bohemian nobleman

- Supreme Marshal of the Kingdom of Bohemia
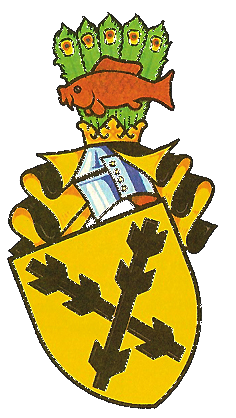
- Coat of arms
- Died: c. 1415
- Noble family: Lipá family
- Wife: Markéta of Šternberk
- Issue: Kateřina of Lipá
- Father: Henry III of Lipá

Hanuš of Lipá (died 1415) was a Bohemian nobleman and military leader. He was acting lord of Rataje nad Sázavou before the heir Jan Ptáček of Pirkstein came of age, and was appointed Supreme Marshal of the Kingdom of Bohemia shortly before his death.

== Biography ==
Hanuš was the third son of Henry III of Lipá. He is first mentioned in a document from 1397. Hanuš is known to have joined John of Görlitz' campaign to free King Wenceslaus IV from captivity in 1394 during the Second Margrave War.

Hanuš, his father, and his brothers were placed in charge of Rataje nad Sázavou after the death of Jan Ješek Ptáček of Pirkštein. The heir of Rataje nad Sázavou, Jan Ptáček of Pirkstein, was not yet of age. In 1403, Hanuš welcomed Racek Kobyla of Dvorce and some survivors of the attack by Sigismund of Hungary on Stříbrná Skalice into Rataje nad Sázavou.

Hanuš was often in debt, and so from his seat in Rataje nad Sázavou orchestrated attacks on the royal estates. This earned him a reputation as a robber knight.

On 1 February 1412 Hanuš was ordered to pass his holdings to Jan Ptáček of Pirkstein, the rightful heir, though he remained in control of the village of Senohrady. In 1415, he was noted as being Supreme Marshal of the Kingdom of Bohemia. He died later that year.

== In popular culture ==
Sir Hanush of Leipa, a character in the 2018 video game Kingdom Come: Deliverance, is based on Hanuš. He was modelled after the game's director Daniel Vávra and voiced by him in the Czech version of the game; in the English version he was voiced by Peter Hosking. The character was again featured in the 2025 sequel Kingdom Come: Deliverance II.
