= Prince Karl of Auersperg =

Bohemian and Austrian statesman

His Serene Highness Karl von Auersperg 8th Prince of Auersperg
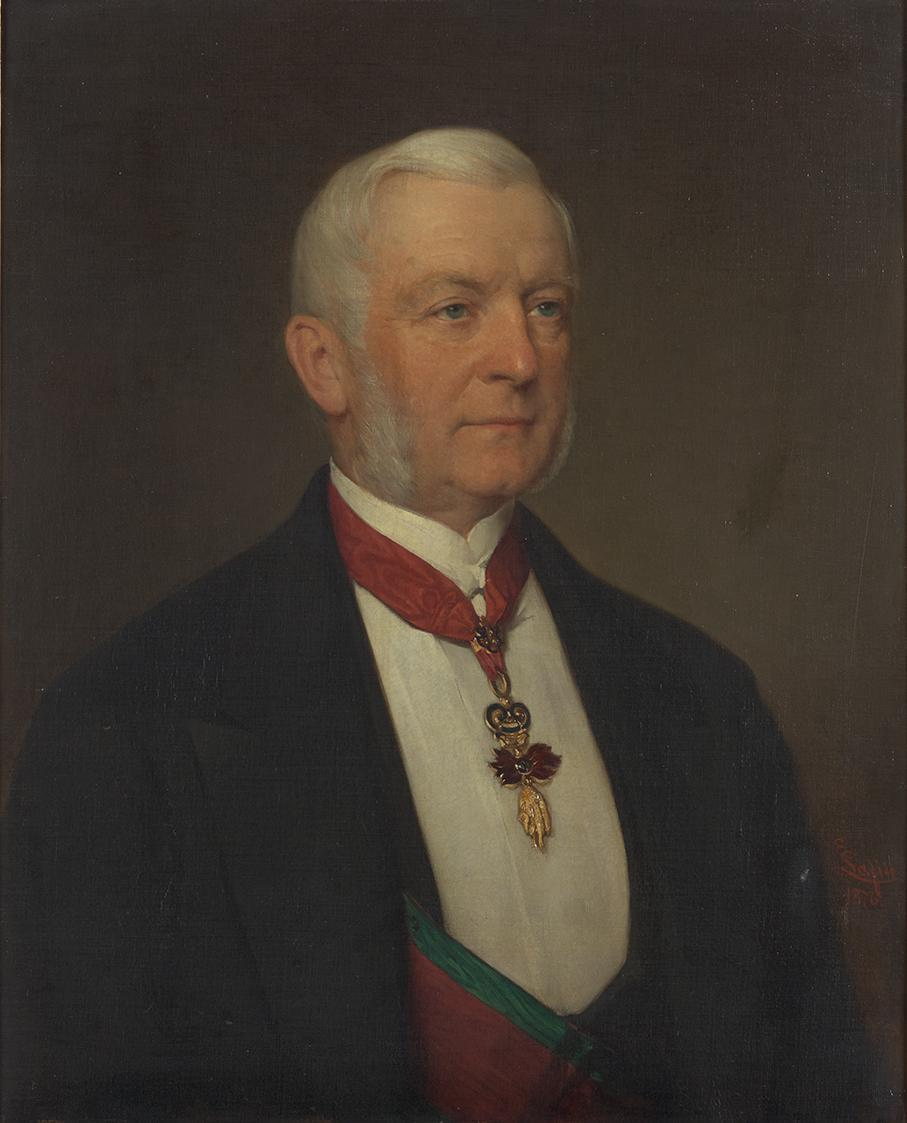
- Portrait by Ernst Lafite, 1876

Minister-President of Austria
- In office 30 December 1867 – 24 September 1868
- Monarch: Franz Joseph I of Austria
- Preceded by: Count Friedrich Ferdinand von Beust (as Chairman of the Conference of Ministers)
- Succeeded by: Eduard, Viscount Taaffe

President of the Austrian House of Lords
- In office 8 April 1861 – 31 December 1867; 8 December 1868 – 15 May 1870; 21 December 1871 – 17 May 1879
- Preceded by: Position established
- Succeeded by: Ferdinand, Prince of Trauttmansdorff

Supreme Marshal of Bohemia
- In office 1872–1883
- Preceded by: Georg Christian, Prince of Lobkowicz
- Succeeded by: Georg Christian, Prince of Lobkowicz

Personal details
- Born: 1 May 1814 Prague, Kingdom of Bohemia, Austrian Empire
- Died: 4 January 1890 (aged 75) Prague, Kingdom of Bohemia, Austria-Hungary
- Resting place: Auersperg Mausoleum, Losensteinleithen
- Party: Constitutional Party
- Spouse: Countess Ernestine Festetics de Tolna
- Children: None
- Parents: Wilhelm II, Prince of Auersperg (father); Frederika von Lenthe (mother)
- Education: University of Prague
- Awards: Order of the Golden Fleece; Grand Cross of the Order of Saint Stephen

Karl Wilhelm Philipp, 8th Prince of Auersperg, Duke of Gottschee (German: Karl Wilhelm Philipp Fürst von Auersperg, Herzog von Gottschee; 1 May 1814 in Prague – 4 January 1890 in Prague) was a Bohemian and an Austrian nobleman and statesman. He served as the first President of the Austrian House of Lords and as the first prime minister of the western part of the Austro-Hungarian Empire (Cisleithania).

== Early life ==
He was the eldest son of Wilhelm II of Auersperg (1782–1827) and, his second wife, Friederike Luise Wilhelmine Henriette von Lenthe. His paternal grandparents were Wilhelm I of Auersperg and Leopoldine von Waldstein-Wartenberg. His maternal grandparents were Carl Levin Otto von Lenthe and Henriette Friederike Wilhelmine Sophie Bennigsen von Banteln (a daughter of Count Levin August von Bennigsen).

The 8th Prince of Auersperg, Karl Wilhem, was heir to one of the most prominent princely families of the Holy Roman Empire, whose Imperial Estate was mediatized in the Austrian Empire following the German Mediatisation of the post-revolutionary era. He became head of the princely House at the age of thirteen on the death of his father, Wilhelm II, in 1827.

== Career ==
As a member of the German-Liberal Party, Karl represented the landed nobility in the Bohemian Landtag (provincial assembly) during the 1840s and took a conspicuous part in defending the constitutional system against Prince Metternich's Vormärz regime, which was becoming increasingly unpopular throughout the Austrian Empire and ultimately culminated in the German revolutions of 1848–1849.

In the following decade, after the resignation of Metternich as first minister and the abdication of Emperor Ferdinand I in favour of Emperor Franz Joseph I, Karl remained largely absent from public life.

=== Constitutional era ===
On the advent of the new constitutional era in 1861, Franz Joseph I established a bicameral Imperial Council in the Austrian Empire and appointed Karl as the first President of the House of Lords. Karl became the longest serving president over his three terms in office (1861–1867, 1896–1870, 1871–1879). In 1861 Karl also rejoined the Bohemian Landtag where he served intermittently as Oberstlandmarschall (supreme provincial marshal) of Bohemia and as chairman of the Landesausschuss (state committee) until 1883.

=== Austro-Hungarian empire ===
After the constitutional changes that led to the creation the dual monarchy of Austria-Hungary in 1867, the Emperor turned to the German-Liberals (who had supported the Austro-Hungarian Compromise) to form the new Austrian government and appointed Karl as the first Prime Minister. Karl's cabinet was referred to as the Citizens' Ministry as four out of its nine cabinet members were commoners (without noble titles) and another had only been ennobled eleven years previously. After conflicts in the cabinet over concessions to various nationalities and ethnic groups through federalism, he resigned in protest on 4 September 1868. Although an advocate of centralism, he agreed to negotiations with the Czechs in order to win their participation in the Imperial Council. In his view, Viscount Taaffe and Foreign Minister Count Friedrich Ferdinand von Beust made excessive concessions to the Czech National Party.

After his retirement, Karl worked as a zealous supporter of the policies of his brother, Prince Adolf of Auersperg, who served as Prime Minister of Austria from 1871 to 1879.

== Personal life ==
Karl's central estates were Vlašim in Bohemia and Gottschee in Carniola, while his primary seat in Austria was Schloss Losensteinleithen in Upper Austria. His residence in Prague was the Auersperg Palace, an early Baroque building opposite Wallenstein Palace in Malá Strana. In 1904, the palace was bought from the Auersperg family by the Land Committee of the Kingdom of Bohemia and utilized by state authorities throughout the 20th century. Following the Velvet Revolution, it was integrated into the parliamentary seat of the Chamber of Deputies.

In 1851, he married Countess Ernestine Festetics de Tolna, daughter of Count Ernő János Vilmos. As he died without issue, he was succeeded as Prince of Auersperg by his nephew, Karl, 9th Prince of Auersperg.

== Honours ==
- Knight of the Golden Fleece, 1852 (Austrian Empire)
- Grand Cross of St. Stephen, 1863 (Austrian Empire)

== Gallery ==
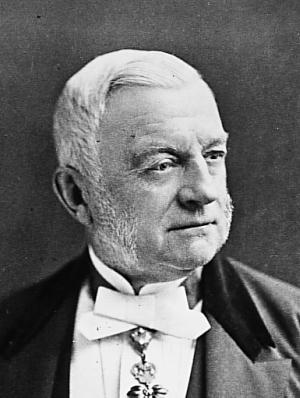
Portrait

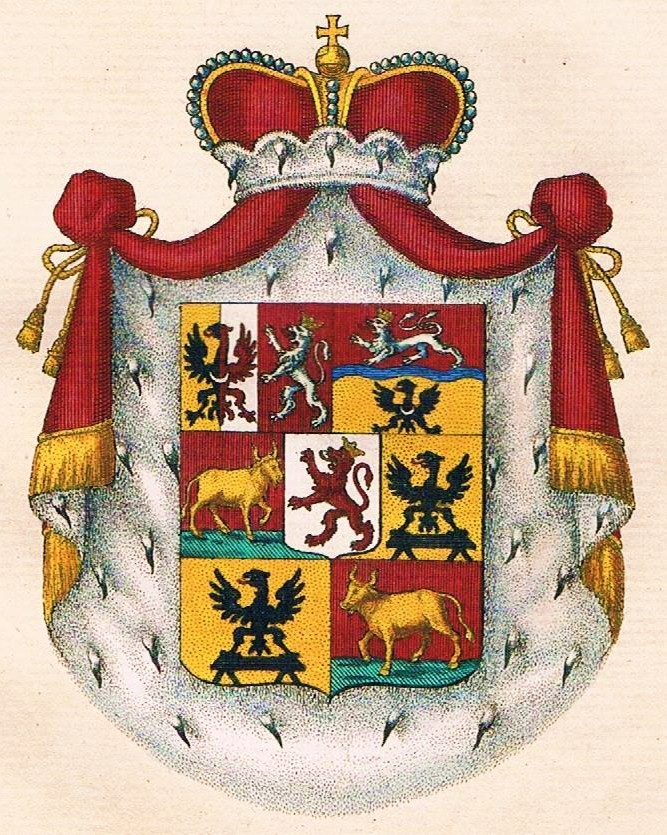
Coat of Arms of the Princely House of Auersperg

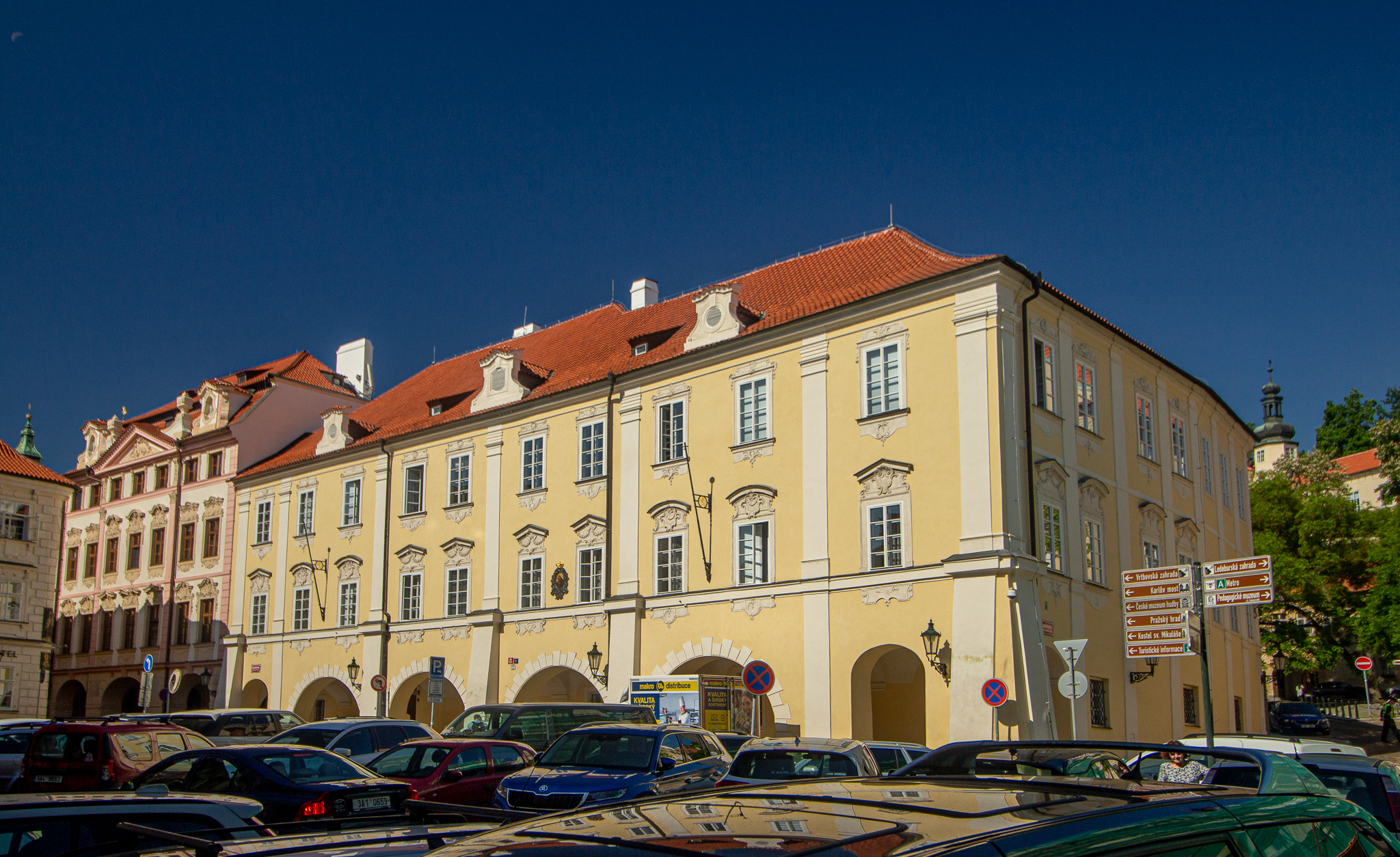
Auersperg Palace in Prag

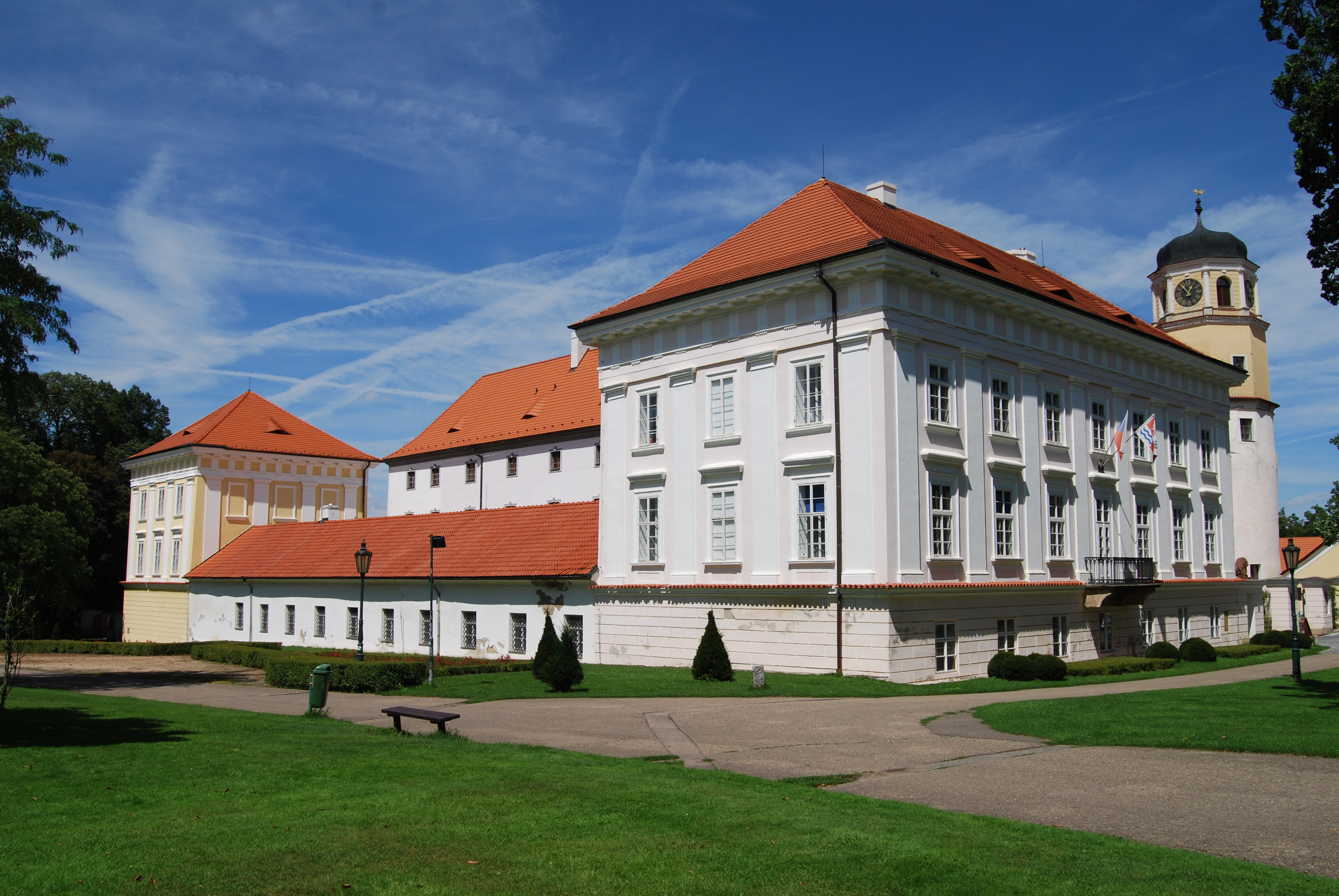
Vlašim Castle

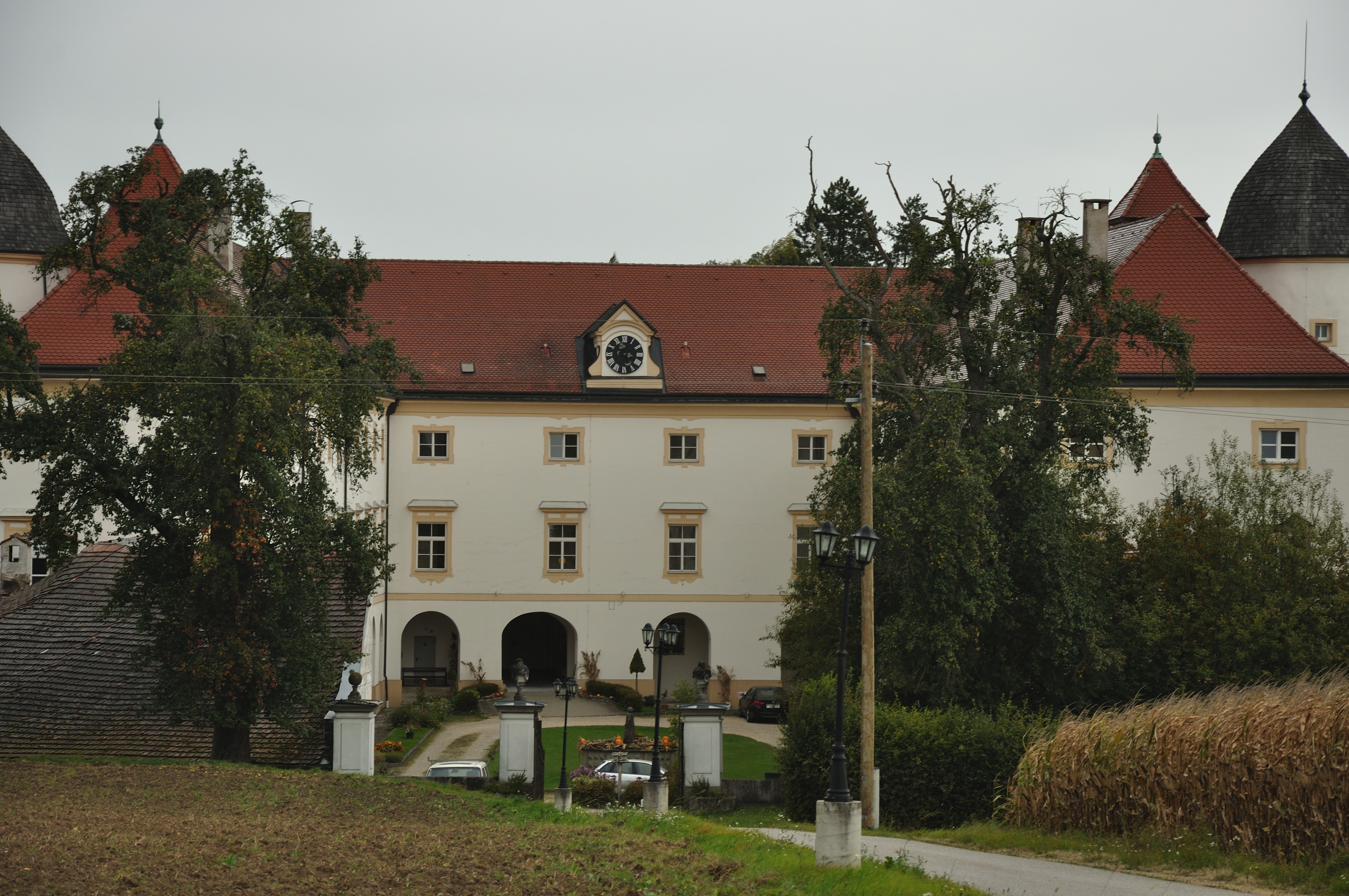
Schloss Losensteinleithen

== See also ==
- List of minister-presidents of Austria

Political offices
Preceded by New creation	Minister-President of Cisleithania; 1867–1868	Succeeded by Eduard Taaffe, 11th Viscount Taaffe
Titles of nobility
Preceded by Wilhelm of Auersperg	Prince of Auersperg; 1827–1890	Succeeded by Karl of Auersperg
