= Auersperg Palace (Prague) =

Baroque palace in Prague, Czech Republic

- Aueršperský palác
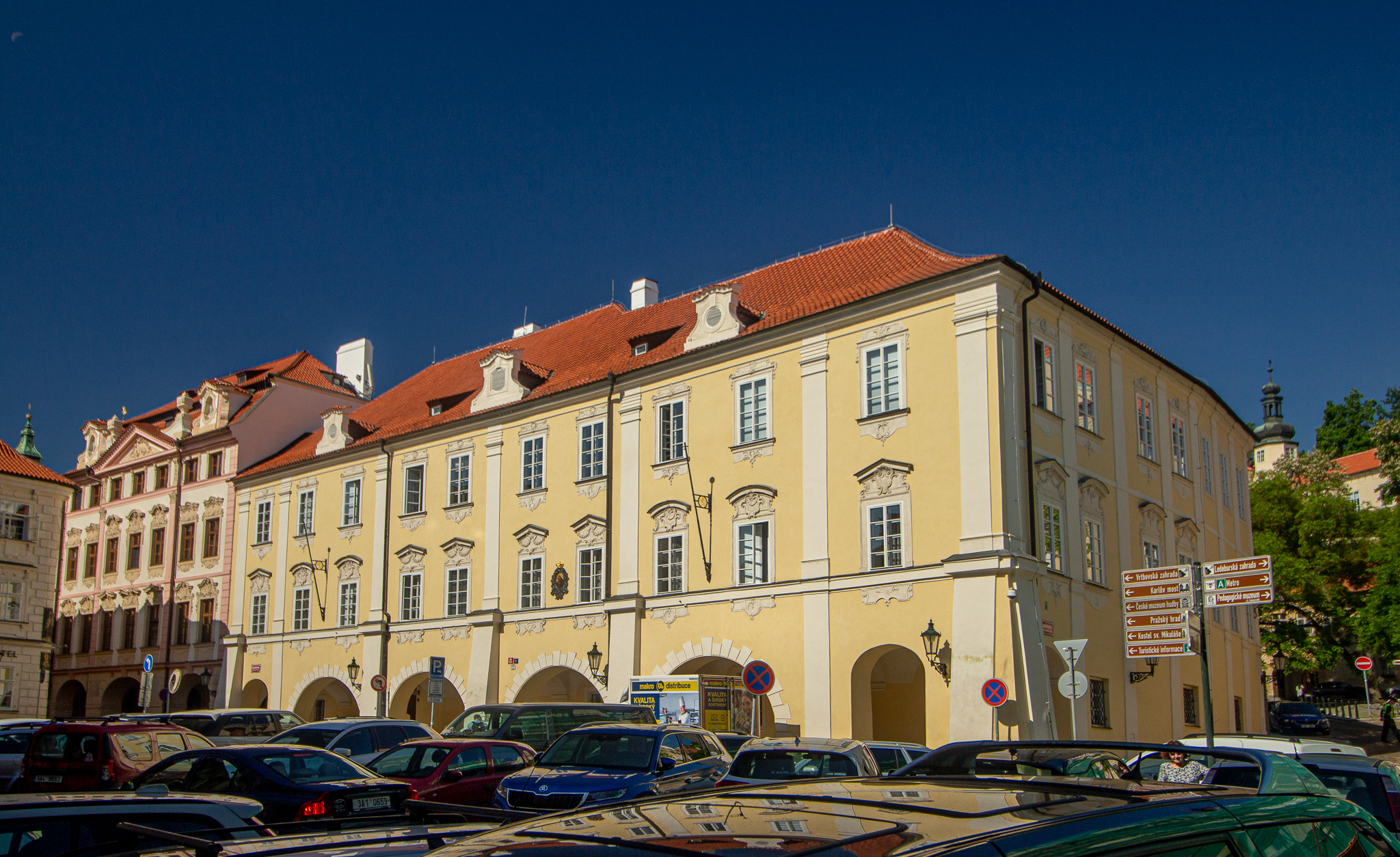
- Auersperg Palace on Wallenstein Square
- Interactive map of the Auersperg Palace area

General information
- Architectural style: Baroque
- Location: Prague, Czech Republic
- Coordinates: 50.08989°N 14.40475°E
- Construction started: 1680
- Completed: 1682
- Client: Count Johann Markus of Clary-Aldringen
- Owner: Chamber of Deputies of the Parliament of the Czech Republic

National Cultural Monument of the Czech Republic
- Designated: October 15, 1992
- Reference no.: 38963/1-515

Auersperg Palace (Aueršperský palác), also known as the Clary-Aldringen Palace, is an early Baroque palace located on Wallenstein Square in the Malá Strana district of Prague, Czech Republic. It is protected as part of a national cultural monument complex.

The palace was formed in 1682 through the merger of two medieval residential houses, featuring a modest early Baroque facade that underwent a minor remodeling in 1751. In the 19th century, it served as the primary city residence and political base for the brothers Prince Karl of Auersperg and Prince Adolf of Auersperg, both of whom served as minister-president of Austria and supreme marshal of Bohemia. Following its acquisition by the state in 1904, the building was utilized by various administrative authorities and today forms part of the seat of the Chamber of Deputies of the Parliament of the Czech Republic.

== History ==
=== Medieval and Renaissance origins ===
Archaeological excavations at the site of the palace have revealed remains of early medieval manufacturing facilities and the outer edge of a burial ground connected to the long-destroyed Romanesque Church of Saint Andrew. By the 16th century, three distinct houses occupied the plot, two of which were merged in 1526. Both the unified building and its remaining independent neighbor, both featuring Gothic structures rebuilt in the Renaissance style, were completely gutted during the great fire of 1541, which destroyed most of the Malá Strana and Hradčany districts.

=== Baroque conversions and noble ownership ===
The modern architectural history of the site began following the Battle of White Mountain. In 1680, Count Johann Markus von Clary-Aldringen purchased the merged Renaissance building, acquiring the adjacent medieval property two years later. He initiated an early Baroque reconstruction between 1680 and 1682 that structurally connected the two properties behind a newly unified facade featuring an open arcade and Tuscan pilasters.

In 1751, the facade underwent minor alterations but retained its early Baroque appearance.

The property was acquired by Wilhelm II, 7th Prince of Auersperg (1782–1827) in 1824. The family subsequently remodeled the interior in the Classicist style, adding a second-floor extension in 1856 and a Historicist Mirror Salon in 1863.

The palace notably served as a political base and city residence for his sons, Prince Karl and Prince Adolf of Auersperg, who both served as supreme marshal of the kingdom of Bohemia.

=== 20th century to present ===
In 1904, the Auersperg family sold the palace complex to the Bohemian Land Committee. Throughout the 20th century, the building was continuously repurposed to host various state and municipal administrative offices. Following the Velvet Revolution and the subsequent dissolution of Czechoslovakia, the palace was officially integrated into the sprawling modern governmental complex that serves as the permanent seat of the Chamber of Deputies of the Parliament of the Czech Republic.
