= Henry III of Lipá =

Czech nobleman and marshal

- Supreme Marshal of the Kingdom of Bohemia
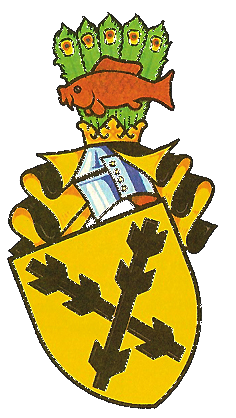
- Coat of arms
- Born: c. 1322
- Died: c. 1405
- Wife: Ofca of Kravař
- Father: Henry II of Lipá

Henry III of Lipá (Czech: Jindřich III. z Lipé; c. 1321 – c. 1405) was a Czech nobleman and marshal.

== Biography ==
Henry was the eldest son of Henry II of Lipá, though the exact date of his birth remains unknown. He is first mentioned in a document dating 28 November 1337, when he was around the age of 15. In the 1350s, he took part in the provincial court of Brno, and was a member of the entourage of Charles IV.

After the death of his uncle Čeněk of Lipá in 1363, Henry was appointed Supreme Marshal of the Kingdom of Bohemia. He was elected as the protector and administrator of the estates of the Olomouc diocese from 1385 to 1387. In the early 1390s, he joined the noble coalition against Wenceslas IV. After the death of Jan Ješek Ptáček of Pirkštein, Henry and his sons Henry, Hanuš, and Čeňek became the guardians of Jan Ptáček of Pirkštein.

Henry was captured by an Austrian raid party during the Third Margrave War in 1402 and imprisoned in Vienna. He died shortly after his release in 1405.

== Family ==
Henry was married to Ofka of Kravaře. He fathered four sons, Henry, Pertold, Hanuš, and Čeňek. He also had two daughters, Anežka and Helena.
