= Henry of Lipá =

Czech nobleman and marshal

- Supreme Marshal of the Kingdom of Bohemia; Governor of Moravia
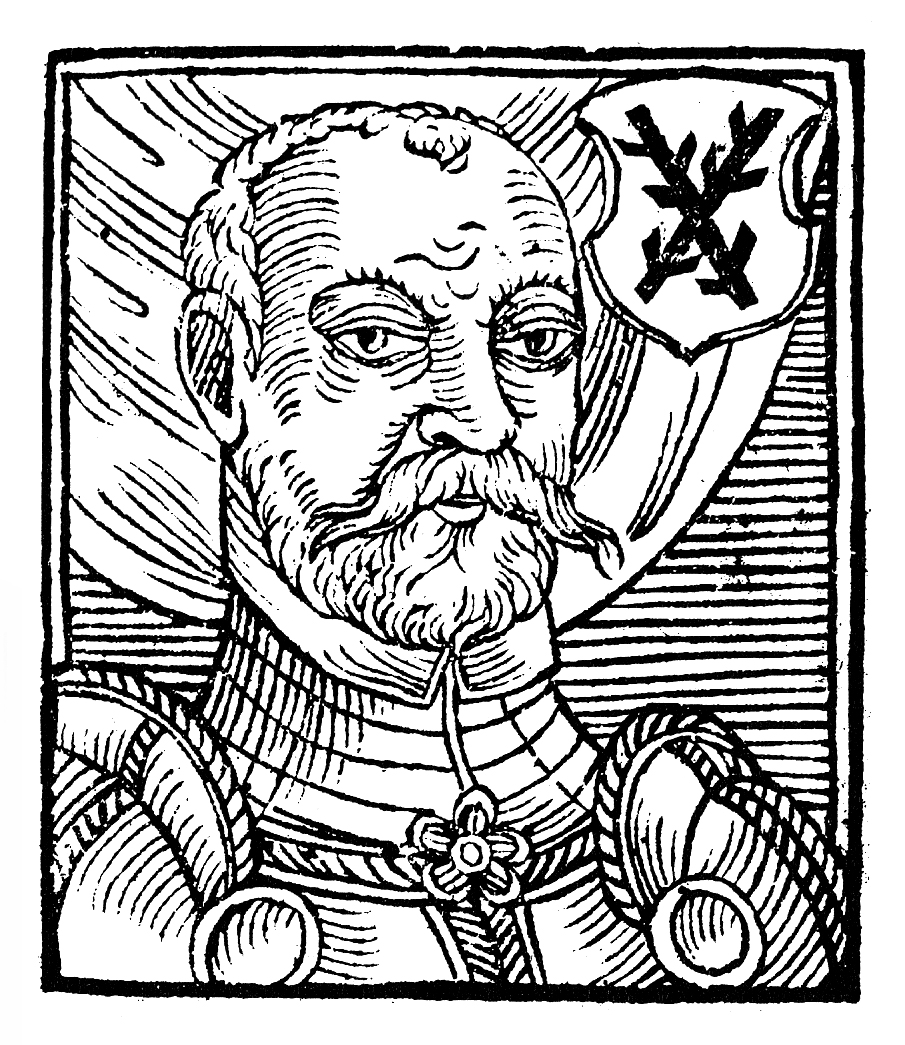
- Henry of Lipá, portrayed by Bartosz Paprocki

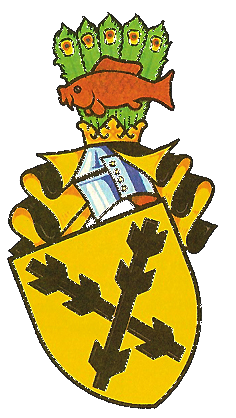
- Coat of arms
- Born: between 1269-1279
- Died: 26 August 1329; Brno
- Noble family: Lipá family
- Spouse: Scholastice (m. ca. 1295)
- Issue: 7, including Henry II of Lipá
- Father: Chval of Lipá (disputed)

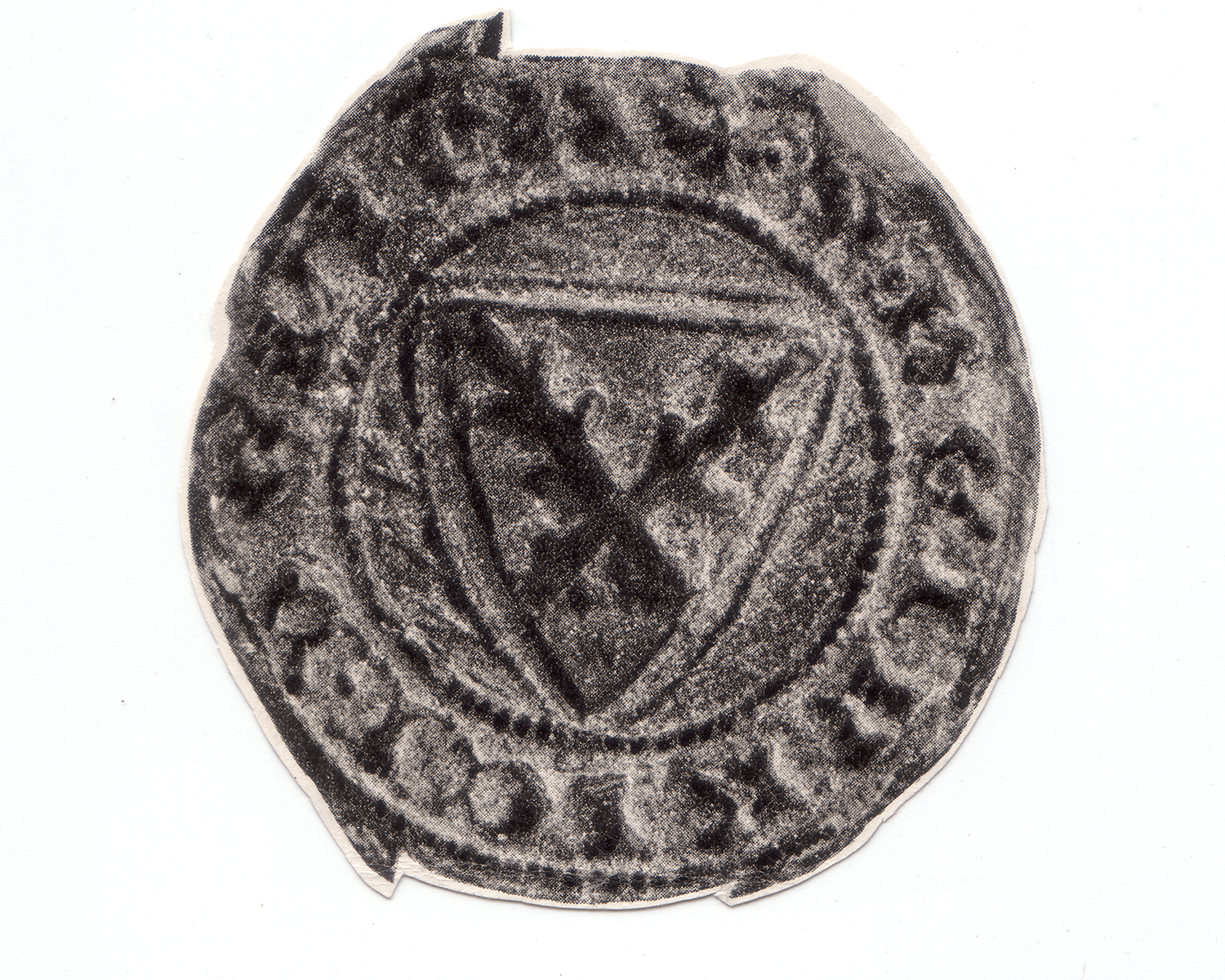
Seal of Henry of Lipa, 1316

Henry of Lipá (Czech: Jindřich z Lipé; ca. 1270s - 26 August 1329) was a prominent Czech nobleman, marshal, and powerful magnate in the Kingdom of Bohemia.

== Biography ==
Henry was born to the prominent Ronovci family. Medical examination of his skeleton showed that he had died in his 50s, which would place his birth between 1269 and 1279.

Henry is traditionally considered to be the son of Chval of Lipá. However, some research suggests that there is a missing generation, and that Henry and his brother Čeněk of Oybin may be the grandsons of Chval instead. It has been proposed that Chval's son Čeněk of Lipá is not identical to Čeněk of Oybin, and perhaps the two brothers are the sons of the elder Čeněk. (Note: Čeněk of Lipá is last mentioned in 1278, and according to M. Sovadina, he probably died in battle. Čeněk of Oybin first appears in sources in 1290 and Henry of Lipá in 1296.)

Henry first appears in documents from the royal court of Prague in 1296 with his brother Čeněk. He fought against the King Albert I of Germany, defending Kutná Hora in 1304 together with his friend Jan of Vartenberk. He began to appear more regularly on documents from 1306, and he was counted among the country's most important nobles.

Through his influence, Henry helped Henry of Bohemia to the throne, but also he contributed to his expulsion from the country a few years later. In 1310, John of Bohemia appointed him as his chamberlain and as Supreme Marshal of the Kingdom of Bohemia. In 1311, he was removed from office, but he returned in 1315. At the instigation of Queen Elizabeth of Bohemia, he was arrested and accused of conspiracy against the king. However, some of the nobility and his romantic partner, the Dowager Queen Elizabeth Richeza of Poland, sided with Henry. He was released in 1316 after six months in prison.

He regained the title of Supreme Marshal after the death of Vilém of Valdek, retaining it until his own death. From 1319 until his death he was the provincial governor in Moravia, and during the king's absence between 1319 and 1321, he also served as the provincial governor of Bohemia.

He died on 26 August 1329 after spending his last years with Elisabeth Richeza at his court in Brno. He is buried in the Basilica of the Assumption of Our Lady (Old Brno Abbey) in Brno, alongside Richeza who was also interred there after her own death.

== Personal life ==
Henry married around 1295, to a woman named Scholastice, who might have been a descandant of nobles from Kamenz. They had four sons - Henry II, Jan, Pertold of Lipá and Čeněk of Lipá - and three daughters: Kateřina, Klára and Markéta.

While he remained legally married to Scholastice (who ultimately outlived him) and never attempted to dissolve their marriage, Henry cohabited with Dowager Queen of Bohemia and Poland, Elizabeth Richeza, since 1310s until his death. Richeza later ordered to be buried next to him.

== Bibliography ==
- Bobková, Lenka (2003). Velké dějiny zemí koruny české. Paseka. ISBN 80-7185-501-4.
- Duczmal, Małgorzata (2010). Ryksa Piastówna. Królowa Czech i Polski (1st ed.). Wydawnictwo Manuskrypt. ISBN 83-923110-1-9.
- Emler, Josef (1882). Regatta diplomatica nec non epistolaria Bohemiae a Moraviae (in Latin).
- Fiala, Zdeněk (1976). Chronicon aulae regiae (in Czech). Svoboda.
- Sovadina, Miloslav (2001). "Jindřich z Lipé. I. První muž království. Část 1". Časopis Matice moravské (120).
