= Henry II of Lipá =

Czech nobleman and marshal (d. 1336)

- Supreme Marshal of the Kingdom of Bohemia; Governor of Bohemia
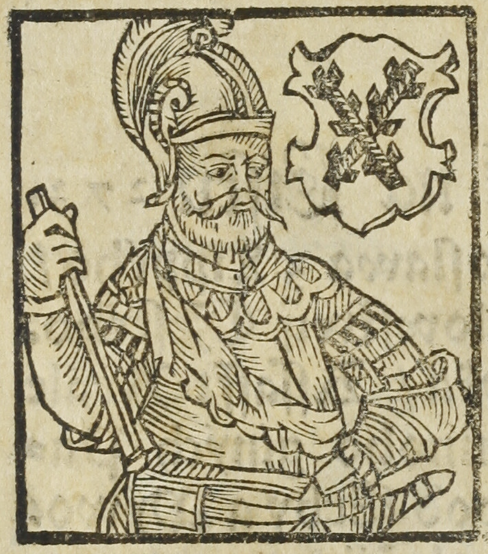
- Henry II by Bartosz Paprocki, 1593

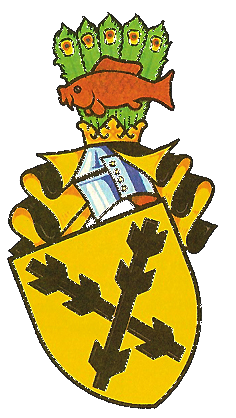
- Coat of arms
- Born: c. 1297
- Died: 1336
- Wife: Agnes of Blankenheim
- Father: Henry of Lipá

Henry II of Lipá (Czech: Jindřich II. z Lipé; c. 1297 – 1336), called Železný, was a Czech nobleman and marshal.

== Biography ==
Henry was the eldest son of Henry of Lipá, though the exact date of his birth remains unknown. He is first mentioned in 1316 as defending the town of Zittau. He participated in politics as his father rose to prominence, and married Agnes of Blankenheim in 1321, a relative of John of Bohemia. He was governor of Bohemia from 1322 to 1325. He began to build his estate, as he acquired the lands of Rychvald and Žampach.

After the death of his father in 1329, Henry was again appointed governor and served as Supreme Marshal of the Kingdom of Bohemia. He was named chamberlain in 1335. Given his brother Jan was appointed Supreme Marshal in 1336, he is assumed to have died that year.

Henry was the father of Henry III of Lipá.
