= Karl Ritter von Stremayr =

Austrian statesman

Hochwohlgeboren Karl Ritter von Stremayr
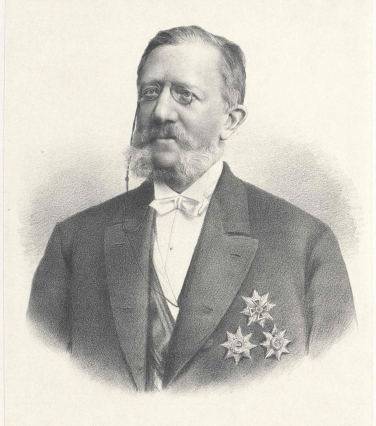
- Knight Karl von Stremayr

Minister-President of Austria
- In office 15 February 1879 – 12 August 1879
- Monarch: Francis Joseph I
- Preceded by: Adolf Furst von Auersperg
- Succeeded by: Eduard Graf von Taaffe

Personal details
- Born: 30 October 1823 Graz
- Died: 22 July 1904 (aged 80) Pottsnach

Karl Ritter von Stremayr (30 October 1823, Graz - 22 June 1904, Pottschach) was an Austrian statesman. He served as the 9th Minister-President of Cisleithania.

== Political career ==
Born in Graz, where he also studied law, he entered the government service, and subsequently was Attorney-General and docent at the University.

In 1848-49 he was a member of the Frankfurt Parliament. In 1868 he was appointed councilor in the Ministry of the Interior, and in 1870-79 was Minister of Public Instruction when he brought about the repeal of the Concordat of 1855.

He was president of the council as the 9th Minister-President of Cisleithania after the going out of the Auersperg ministry in 1879. Afterwards, he entered the cabinet of his successor Eduard Taaffe, 11th Viscount Taaffe, 10th Minister-President of Cisleithania, as Minister of Justice, but resigned in 1880.

He then was appointed vice president of the Austrian Supreme Court before succeeding Anton von Schmerling as president after Schmerling's resignation in 1891.

He retired in 1899. He was called to a seat in the Austrian House of Lords in 1889. Anton Bruckner dedicated to him his Fifth Symphony.
