= Senorady =

- Municipality
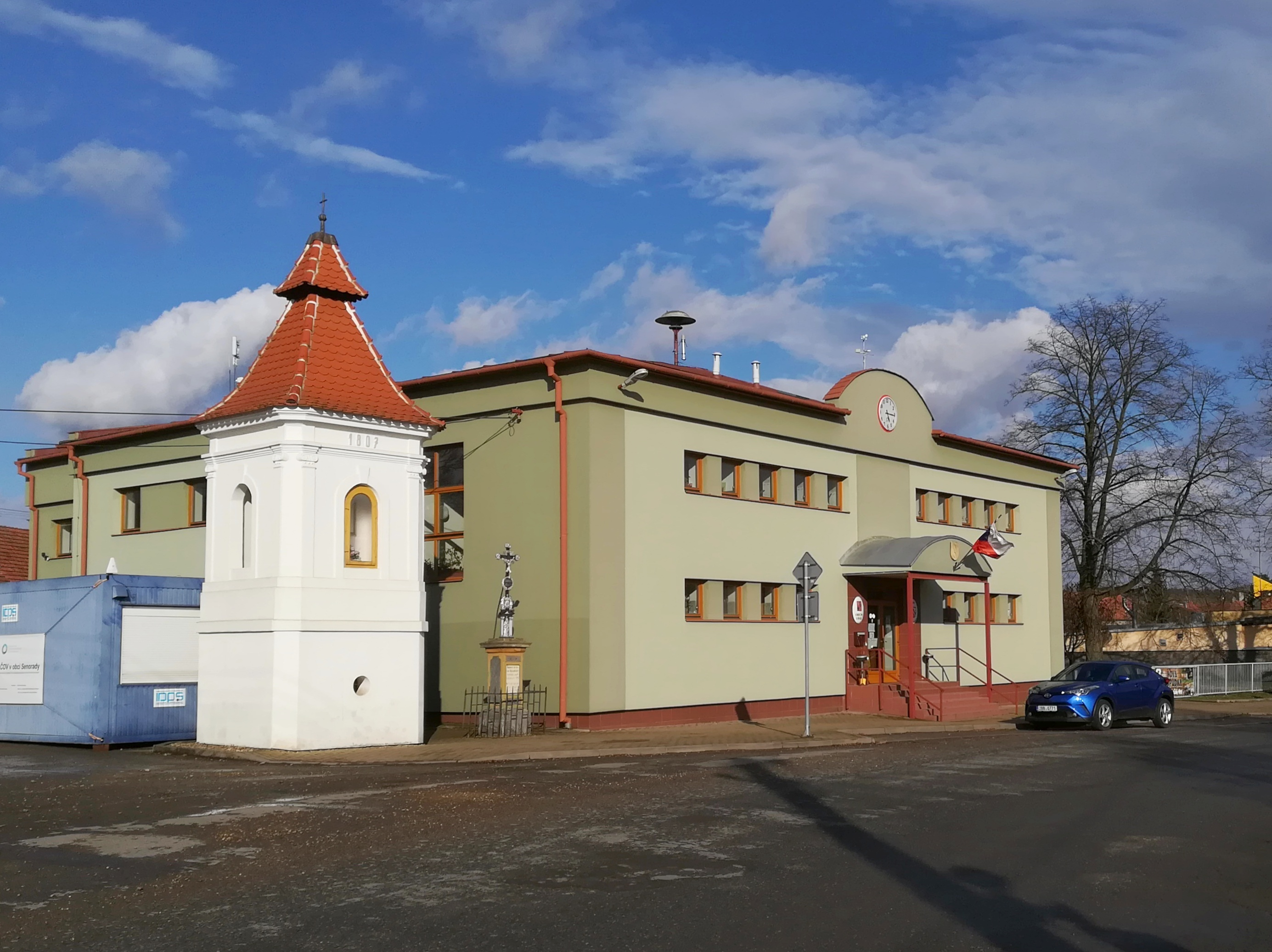
- Belfry and municipal office

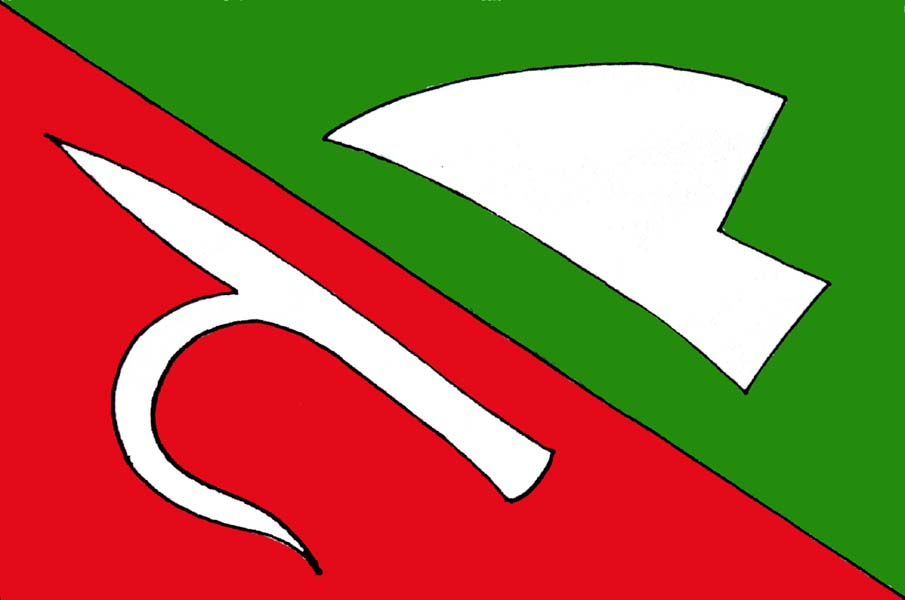
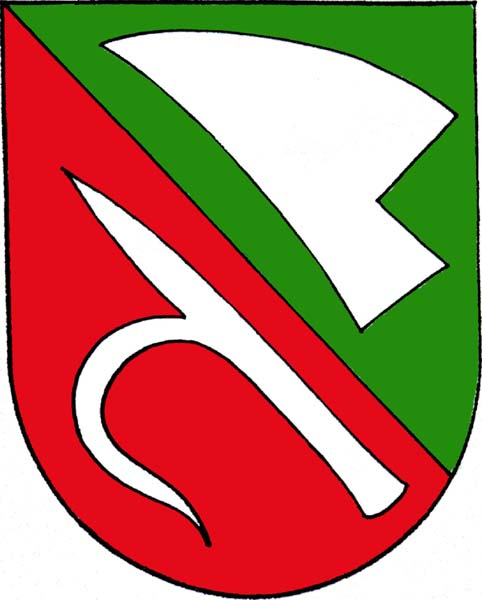
- Flag Coat of arms

- Location in the Czech Republic
- Coordinates: 49°7′28″N 16°14′40″E
- Country: Czech Republic
- Region: South Moravian
- District: Brno-Country
- First mentioned: 1351

Area
  - Total: 9.62 km^{2} (3.71 sq mi)
- Elevation: 325 m (1,066 ft)

Population (2026-01-01)
  - Total: 393
  - Density: 40.9/km^{2} (106/sq mi)
- Time zone: UTC+1 (CET)
  - Summer (DST): UTC+2 (CEST)
- Postal code: 675 75
- Website: www.senorady.cz

Senorady is a municipality and village in Brno-Country District in the South Moravian Region of the Czech Republic. It has about 400 inhabitants.

Senorady lies approximately 29 kilometres (18 mi) west of Brno and 170 km (110 mi) south-east of Prague.

== Demographics ==
Historical population
Year	Pop.	±%
1869	427	—
1880	501	+17.3%
1890	533	+6.4%
1900	550	+3.2%
1910	561	+2.0%
1921	575	+2.5%
1930	564	−1.9%
1950	558	−1.1%
1961	561	+0.5%
1970	527	−6.1%
1980	476	−9.7%
1991	464	−2.5%
2001	410	−11.6%
2011	409	−0.2%
2021	373	−8.8%
Source: Censuses
