= Supreme Marshal of the Kingdom of Bohemia =

Czech provincial office

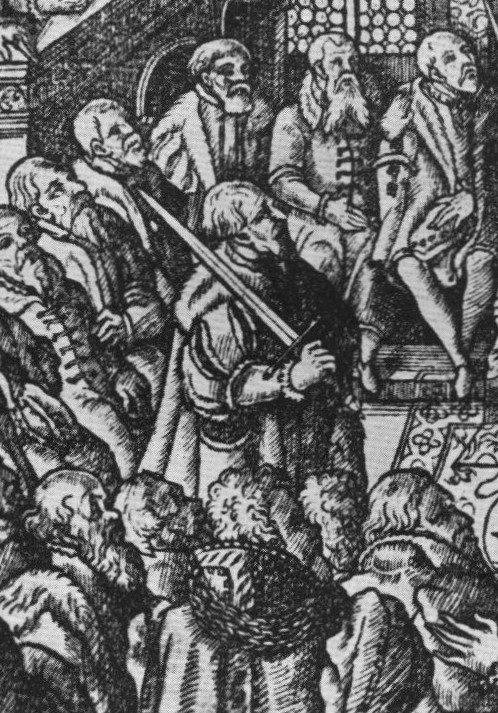
The Supreme Marshal of the Kingdom of Bohemia holding the Sword of Saint Wenceslas at the Bohemian Diet in Prague Castle in 1564.

The Supreme Marshal of the Kingdom of Bohemia (Czech: Nejvyšší maršálek; German: Oberstlandmarschall) was the third most important Czech provincial official. They were the head of the Bohemian Diet. Originally, the office was common in both Bohemia and Moravia, but after 1625, it was limited to Bohemia proper. The office existed from the 13th century until 1913.

Originally, the supreme marshal was a court official, but gradually the office became a professional function. It was in the holders capacity to decide on the honorary affairs of the lord's state. The supreme marshal was the third most important official of the Kingdom of Bohemia, in the Margraviate of Moravia he was the second most important after the governor. From the beginning of the 14th century, the office was inherited in the family of the lords of Lipá, who lost it after the Battle of White Mountain.

== List ==
Coat of arms	Name	Term		Additional information
Coat of arms	Name	Start	End	Additional information
	Henry I of Hradec	1216	1222	
	Častolov of Žitava	1222	?	
	Diviš	1224	?	
	Držislav	1228	?	
	Zdislav	1253	1277	
	Vok I of Rožmberk	1255	1262	
	Henry of Lichtenburg	1263	1267	
	Purkart of Janovice	1267	1275	
	Bavor II of Strakonice	1277	1279	
	Vítek II of Krumlov	1288	1289	
	Albrecht of Žeberek	1289	?	
	Dobeš of Bechyn	1305	1307	
	Henry of Lipá	1308	1317	First term
	Konrad of Buchsess	1317	1318	
	Vilém Zajíc of Valdek	1318	1319	
	Henry of Lipá	1319	1329	Second term
	Henry II of Lipá	1330	1336	
	Jan of Lipá	1337	1343	
	Pertold of Lipá	1343	1347	
	Čeněk of Lipá	1347	1363	
	Henry III of Lipá	1363	1386	
	Henry IV of Lipá	1387	1414	Also known as Hynek of Lipá
	Hanuš of Lipá	1414	1415	
	Henry VII of Lipá	1417	1431	
	Pertold III of Lipá	1431	1449	
	Henry VIII of Lipá	1451	1473	
	Pertold IV of Lipá	1475	1483	
	Vilém II of Pernštejn	1483	1490	
	Henry IX of Lipá	1494	?	
	Jan III of Lipá	1522	1541	
	Pertold V of Lipá	1541	1575	
	Čeněk V of Lipá	1575	1590	
	Jan IV of Lipá	1590	1598	
	Pertold Bohobud of Lipá	1610	1620	
	Lev Burian Berka of Dubá	1620	1626	
	Matyáš Ferdinand Berka of Dubá	1626	1644	
	Adam Matyáš of Trauttmansdorff	1645	1684	
	Rudolf Vilém of Trauttmansdorff	1685	1689	
	Heřman Jakub Černín	1689	1700	
	František Antonín Berka of Dubá	1701	1706	
	Antonín Jan Nostic	1706	1708	
	Jan Václav Gallas	1708	1719	
	Jan Josef Valdštejn	1720	1731	
	Štěpán Vilém Kinský	1733	1740	
	František Jindřich I Šlik	1741	1746	
	František Leopold Buquoy	1747	1749	
	Václav Kazimír Netolicky of Eisenberg	1759	1760	
	Karel Gotthard Schaffgotsch	1760	1767	
	František Adam of Šternberk	1768	1789	
	August Antonín Josef of Lobkowicz	1791	1803	
	Vojtěch Václav of Klebelsberg	1803	1812	
	Josef Antonín Vratislav of Mitrovic	1812	1830	
	Josef of Vrtba	1830	1830	died 1830
	Kristián Kryštof Clam-Gallas	1831	?	
	Albert Nostitz-Rieneck	1861	1863	First term
	Karl von Rothkirch-Panthen	1863	1866	
	Albert Nostitz-Rieneck	1866	1867	Second term
	Edmund Hartig	1867	1867	
	Prince Adolf of Auersperg	1867	1870	
	Albert Nostitz-Rieneck	1870	1871	Third term
	Georg Christian, Prince of Lobkowicz	1871	1872	First term
	Prince Karl of Auersperg	1872	1883	
	Georg Christian, Prince of Lobkowicz	1883	1907	Second term
	Ferdinand Lobkowicz	1907	1913	

== See also ==
- Supreme Burgrave of the Kingdom of Bohemia
- High Chancellor of Bohemia
