= House of Lords (Austria) =

Upper house of the Parliament of Cisleithania, Austria-Hungary (1861–1918)

House of Lords Herrenhaus
- Lesser coat of arms of Cisleithania (1915–1918)

Type
- Type: Upper house of the Imperial Council (Austria)

Leadership
- President (first): Karl Wilhelm, 8th Prince of Auersperg (1861–1867)
- President (last): Alfred III, Prince of Windisch-Grätz (1897–1918)
- Seats: 306 (1917)

Meeting place
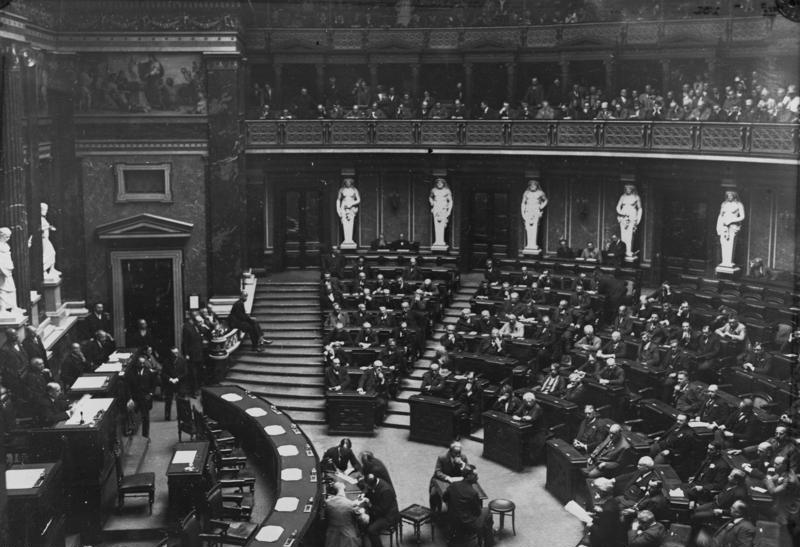
- Debating chamber of the House of Lords; Austrian Parliament Building; Vienna

The House of Lords (German: Herrenhaus; Czech: Panská sněmovna; Italian: Camera dei signori; Slovene: Gosposka zbornica; Polish: Izba Panów; Romanian: Camera Domnilor; Ukrainian: Палата панів, Palata paniv) was the upper house of the Imperial Council, the bicameral legislature of the Austrian Empire from 1861 and of the Cisleithanian (Austrian) half of Austria-Hungary upon the Compromise of 1867. Created by the February Patent issued by Emperor Franz Joseph I on 26 February 1861, it existed until the end of World War I and the dissolution of the Dual Monarchy, when on 12 November 1918 the transitional National Assembly of German-Austria declared it abolished. It was superseded by the Federal Council of the Austrian Parliament implemented by the 1920 Federal Constitutional Law.

== History ==
First attempts to establish a Reichsrat advisory committee had been undertaken by the 1860 October Diploma. As Emperor Franz Joseph's position was weakened by the Second Italian War of Independence and the loss of Lombardy, the Austrian minister-president Count Johann Bernhard von Rechberg und Rothenlöwen sought for a close alliance with the haute bourgeoisie. However, the liberal-minded citizens demanded a parliamentary constitution which finally was promulgated by the 1861 February Patent. Elaborated under Count Rechberg's successor Archduke Rainer and State Minister Anton von Schmerling, it gave way for the transition of Austria to a constitutional monarchy. The newly established bicameral legislature of the Imperial Council included the House of Lords, meant as a class-oriented council to counterbalance the lower House of Deputies, which were sent by the provincial assemblies (Landtage). The Patent was rejected in the Habsburg Kingdom of Hungary, which demanded its own constitution. This eventually led to the creation of the sovereign Lands of the Crown of Saint Stephen in 1867.

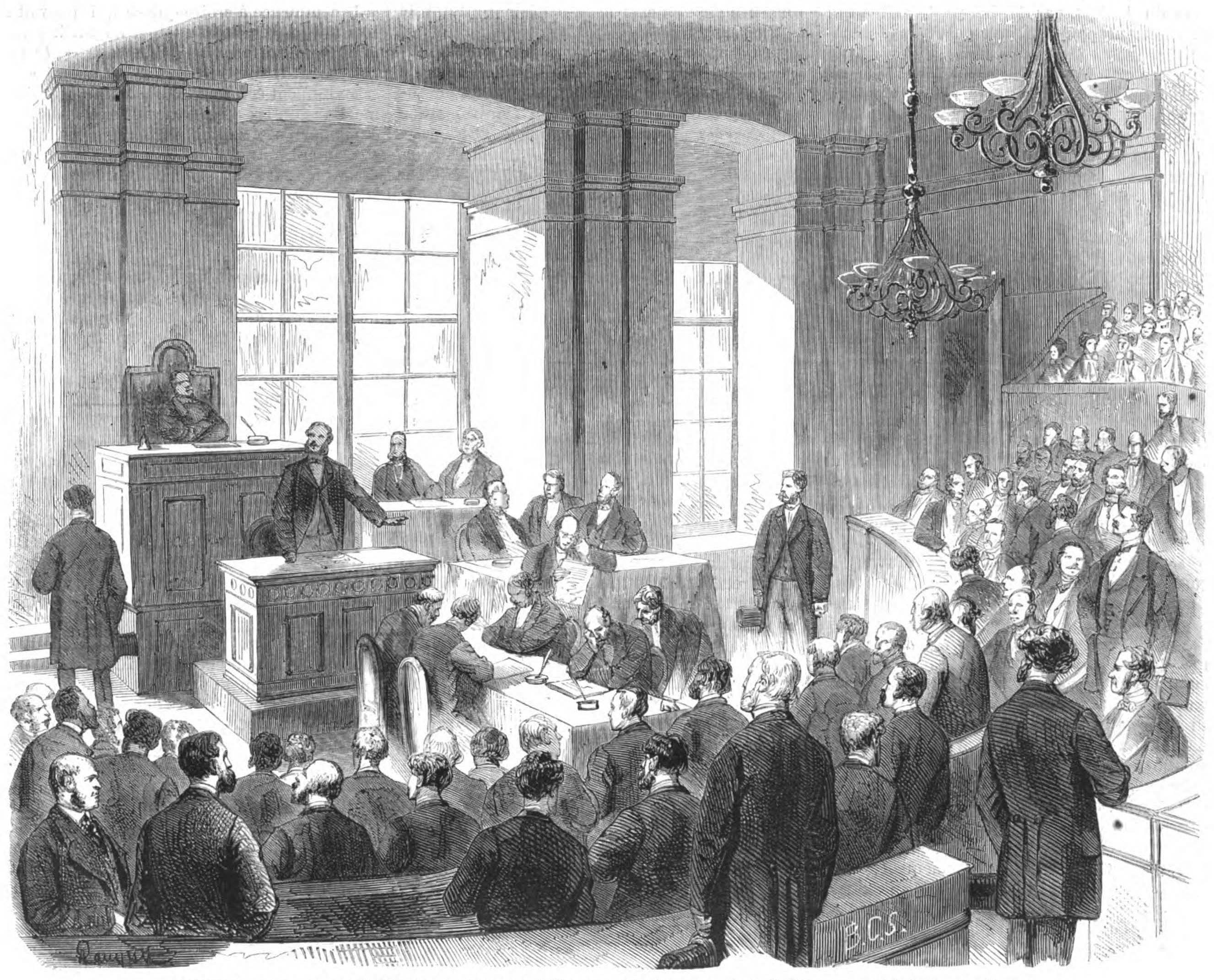
House of Lords session at the Palais Niederösterreich, 1868

The House of Lords met for the first time on 29 April 1861 at the Palais Niederösterreich in Vienna's Herrengasse, its venue until the Austrian Parliament Building on the Ringstrasse boulevard was completed. The first session at the new location was held on 4 December 1883.

The Hungarian magnates refused to send members to the Austrian House of Lords and insisted on their own parliamentary assembly. Their requests were initially denied by Minister Schmerling ("Austria can wait"), nevertheless, on the eve of the Austro-Hungarian Compromise, the inaugural session of the second legislature took place on 20 May 1867 without Hungarian representatives even being called. Half a year later, the Diet of Hungary (Hungarian: Országgyűlés) was re-established by the December Constitution, including a House of Representatives as well as a House of Magnates (Főrendiház), while the Reichsrat legislature was only responsible for the Cisleithanian crown lands. Those common affairs which related to the whole Dual Monarchy, such as foreign policy, national defence and finances, were examined by parliamentary delegations of 60 MPs each; one third of the Austrian delegates were elected by the House of Lords.

In December 1906, the members of the House of Lords led by Archduke Franz Ferdinand bitterly opposed the implementation of universal male suffrage, initiated by the Austrian government of Minister-president Baron Max Wladimir von Beck to meet the demands of the Social Democrats under Victor Adler. Beck could win the support by Emperor Franz Joseph, who sent his Grand Masters of the Court Prince Rudolf of Liechtenstein and Prince Alfred of Montenuovo to plead for the electoral reform in parliament. The proposal was finally approved and applied to the Cisleithanian legislative elections of 1907 and 1911.

During the collapse of the Austro-Hungarian Empire, the last session of the House of Lords was held on 30 October 1918. The last Austrian Minister-president Heinrich Lammasch announced that his cabinet, appointed by Emperor Charles I on 27 October, would make no policy statement, whereupon the meeting was adjourned by Speaker Prince Alfred III of Windisch-Grätz after only five minutes. At the same time, the Provisional National Assembly of German-Austria met at the Palais Niederösterreich and implemented the government of State Chancellor Karl Renner.

The House of Lords chamber of the Parliament Building was destroyed by bombing during World War II. It was rebuilt in a contemporary style, and today serves as the chamber of the Austrian National Council.

== Membership ==
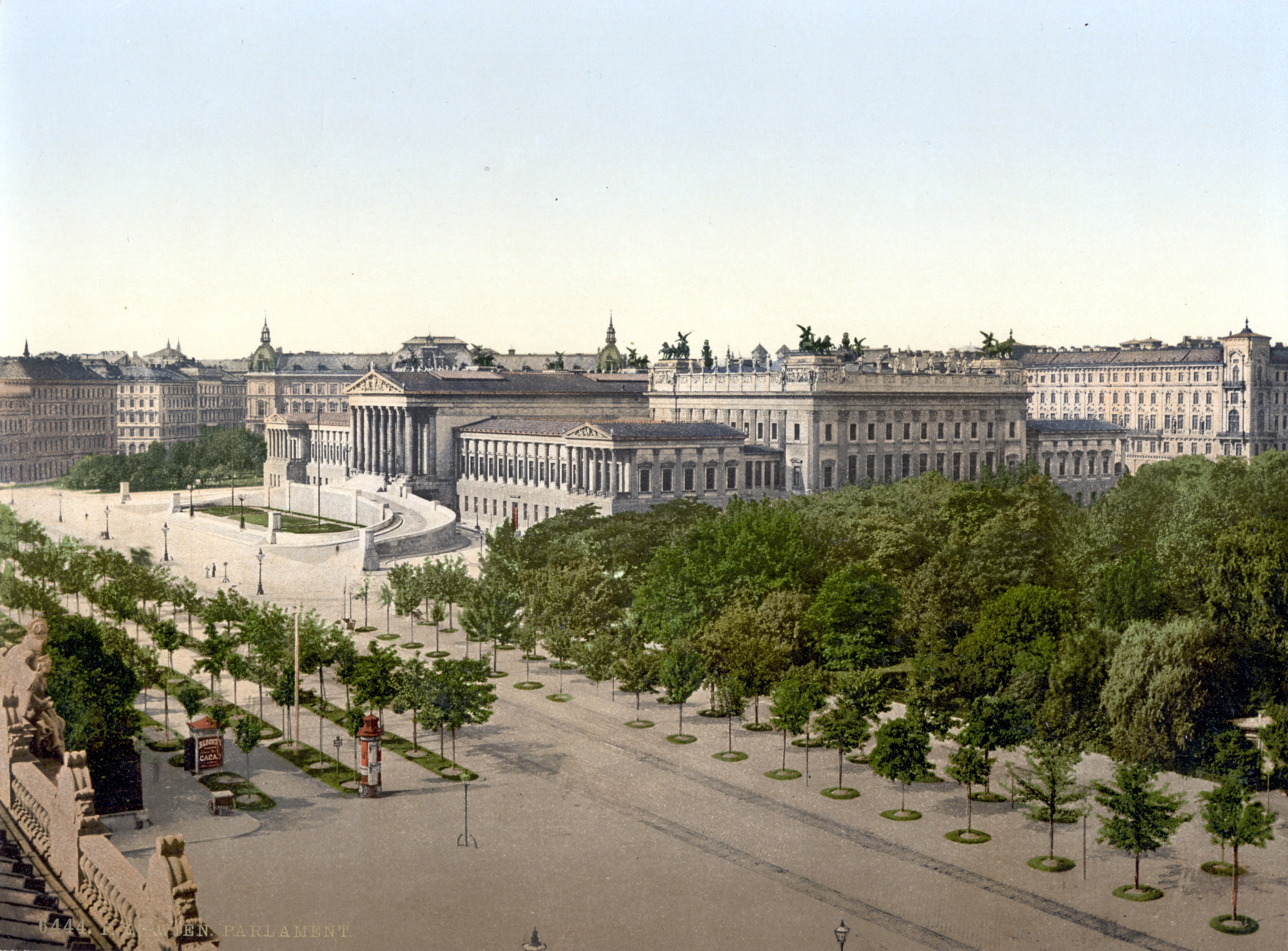
Austrian Parliament building (c. 1900)

Unlike the elected House of Deputies, most new members of the House of Lords were appointed. Membership of the House of Lords was made up of:

1. the appointed Archdukes of the ruling House of Habsburg-Lorraine
2. the Austrian archbishops and bishops of princely rank (similar to the Lords Spiritual of the United Kingdom)
3. the heads of the wealthy and landed noble dynasties entitled by the Emperor of Austria (similar to hereditary peers)
4. Austrian citizens appointed for life by the emperor for their services to the state or church, science or art (similar to life peers).

There were a number of spiritual peers who sat in the House by virtue of their ecclesiastical role in the established Catholic Church (both of the Latin Rite and the Byzantine Rite). Beside the archdukes of the imperial family, the entitled secular nobles made up the rest of the membership; of these, the majority were hereditary peers. A smaller number of life peers were appointed by the monarch on the nominal advice of the Austrian Minister-President, or on the advice of the House of Lords Appointments Commission.

Membership was a birthright of all hereditary peers. The number of members was not fixed, though a law enacted in 1907 decreed that the category of life peers shall comprise at least 150 and no more than 170 seats.

Bills could be introduced into either the House of Lords or the House of Deputies. Members of the Lords were also allowed to take on roles as government ministers. The House of Lords had its own support services, separate from the Deputies, including the House of Lords Library.

The House of Lords scrutinised bills that had been approved by the House of Deputies and regularly reviewed and amended them. While it was unable to prevent bills passing into law, except in certain limited circumstances, it could delay them and force the Deputies to reconsider their decisions. In this capacity, the Lords acted as a check on the House of Deputies that was independent from the electoral process.

The Emperor's Speech was delivered in the Hofburg Palace during the State Opening of Parliament. The initial plan to hold the opening ceremonies in the atrium hall of the parliament building was not realised.

== Composition ==
=== Spiritual members ===
According to the 1861 February Patent and its 1867 amendments, 18 members of the Cisleithanian clergy sat in the House of Lords, regardless of their religious denomination:

- the Roman Catholic prince-archbishops of Vienna, Prague, Salzburg, Görz, and Olmütz
- the Roman Catholic archbishops of Lemberg and Zara, the Greek Catholic archbishop of Lemberg, the Armenian Catholic archbishop of Lemberg, and the Greek Orthodox archbishop of Czernowitz
- the Roman Catholic prince-bishops of Brixen, Breslau (for the episcopal territory in Austrian Silesia), Krakau, Seckau, Trient, Laibach, Lavant, and Gurk.

=== Hereditary members ===
106 families had hereditary membership in the House of Lords. These were:

Three sovereign houses:

- Liechtenstein
- Saxe-Coburg and Gotha
- Schaumburg-Lippe

Sixteen mediatised princely houses:

- Lobkowitz
- Dietrichstein
- Auersperg
- Fürstenberg
- Schwarzenberg
- Thurn und Taxis
- Colloredo-Mansfeld
- Khevenhüller
- Hohenlohe-Langenburg
- Starhemberg
- Salm-Raitz
- Orsini-Rosenberg
- Schönburg-Hartenstein
- Metternich-Winneburg
- Windisch-Graetz
- Trauttmansdorff

Sixteen other princely houses:

- Dietrichstein
- Lubomirski
- Porcia
- Lamberg
- Kinsky
- Clary und Aldringen
- Paar
- Czartoryski
- Sanguszko
- Rohan
- Windisch-Graetz
- Collalto und San Salvatore
- Sapieha
- Montenuovo
- Beaufort-Spontin
- Thun und Hohenstein

Four mediatised countships:

- Schönborn
- Wurmbrand-Stuppach
- Kuefstein-Greillenstein
- Harrach

Sixty-four other countships:
Schlick, Lodron, Hardegg, Montecuccoli, Thurn und Valsassina, Buquoy, Tarnowski, Althann, Czernin von und zu Chudenitz, Waldstein-Wartenberg, Thun und Hohenstein, Attems, Des Fours-Walderode, Herberstein, Nostitz, Ungnad von Weißenwolff, Vetter, Abensberg-Traun, Brandis, Trapp, Serényi, Sternberg, Kaunitz, Lamberg, Kolowrat, Hoyos-Stichsenstein, Kinský, Falkenhayn, Goëss, Kálnoky, Wratislaw-Mittrowitz, Zierotin, Podstatzky, Haugwitz, Potocki, Gołuchowski, Lanckoroński, Lewicki, Westphalen, Mensdorff-Pouilly, Miniscalchi, Papafava, Meran, Badeni, Colleoni, Venier, Vrints, Fünfkirchen, Widmann-Sedlnitzky, Dobrženský von Dobrženitz, Walterskirchen, Gudenus, Sedlnitzky, Ludwigstorff, and Wassilko von Serecki

Nine baronial families:

- Walterskirchen
- Locatelli
- Dalberg
- Kotz von Dobrz
- Hackelberg-Landau
- Gudenus
- Sternbach
- Ludwigstorff
- Wassilko von Serecki

Three margravial families:

- Canossa
- Cavriani
- Guidi

In 1911, there were fourteen princes of the Imperial family, eighteen bishops, ninety hereditary peers, and 169 life peers. These were exclusively men. Some members of the House of Lords appointed as life peers include glass tycoon Ludwig Lobmeyr, cotton tycoon Nikolaus Dumba, Germanist Theodor von Karajan, Styrian poet Peter Rosegger, and brewery owner Anton Dreher. The House of Lords was presided over by a president, who was supported by two vice-presidents. From 1907, members of the House of Lords could stand for election to the House of Deputies. Nobles that did not sit in the House of Lords were always able to be elected to the House of Deputies.

== Presidency ==
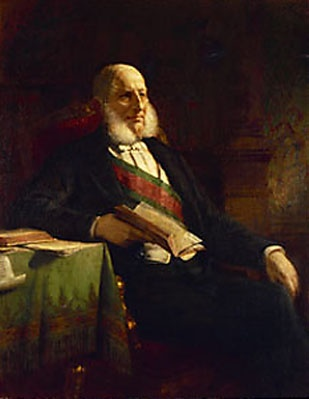
Anton von Schmerling, President of the House of Lords from 1871, painting by Friedrich von Amerling

According to the 1861 February Patent, the presiding committee of the House of Lords was made up of the president and his deputies, always aristocratic members who were appointed by the emperor at the beginning of a new legislative session. The emperor also had the exclusive right to recall the presidium, which never happened throughout the years of the House's existence. The meetings were alternately chaired by the board members, temporarily acting as President of the House of Lords.

=== Presidents ===
- Karl Wilhelm 8th Prince of Auersperg (8 April 1861 – 31 December 1867)
- Josef 4th Prince of Colloredo-Mannsfeld (31 January 1868 – 15 May 1869)
- Karl Wilhelm 8th Prince of Auersperg (8 December 1869 – 21 May 1870)
- Count Franz of Kuefstein (13 September 1870 – 1 March 1871)
- Karl Wilhelm 8th Prince of Auersperg (21 December 1871 – 17 May 1879)
- Anton Ritter von Schmerling (14 February 1871 – 10 August 1871)
- Ferdinand Hereditary Count of Trauttmansdorff-Weinsberg (30 September 1879 – 12 December 1896)
- Alfred III, Prince of Windisch-Grätz (25 March 1897 – 12 November 1918)

=== Vicepresidents ===
- Alfred III, Prince of Windisch-Grätz (1892 – 1897)
- Karl Maria Alexander 9th Prince of Auersperg (1897 – 1907)
- Maximilian Egon II, 8th Prince of Fürstenberg (21 May 1917 – 12 November 1918)
- Alois 4th Prince of Schönburg-Hartenstein (21 May 1917 – 12 November 1918)
- Prince Ferdinand of Lobkowitz (12 October 1917 – 12 November 1918)
- Count Ernst of Silva-Tarouca (30 August 1917 – October 1917)
