= Neidling =

- Municipality
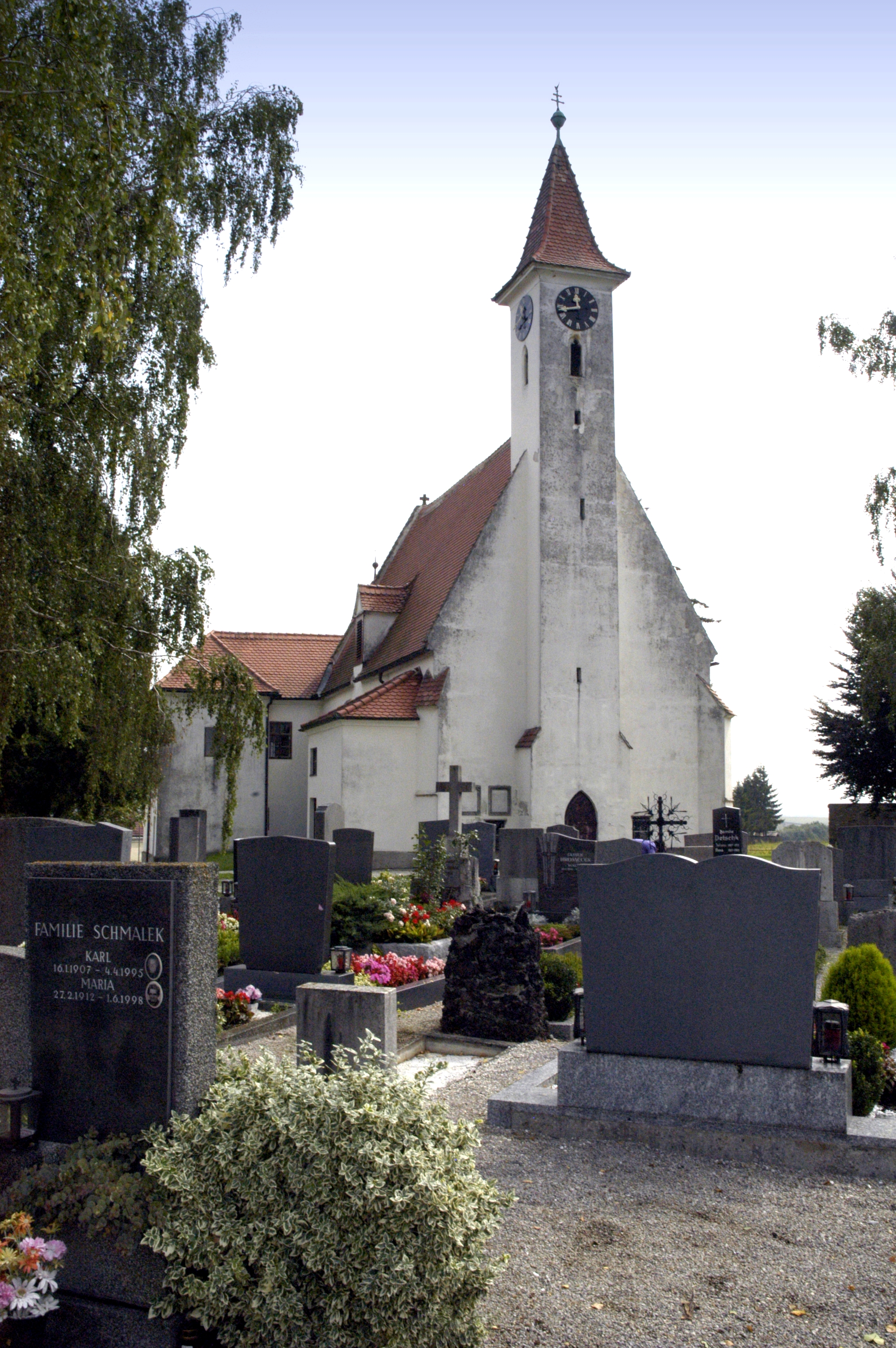
- Neidling parish church

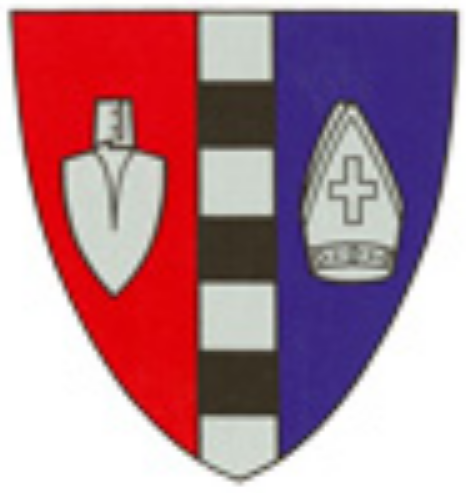
- Coat of arms

- Location within Austria
- Coordinates: 48°14′N 15°33′E
- Country: Austria
- State: Lower Austria
- District: Sankt Pölten-Land

Government
  - Mayor: Stefan Klammer (ÖVP)

Area
  - Total: 18.59 km^{2} (7.18 sq mi)
- Elevation: 312 m (1,024 ft)

Population (2018-01-01)
  - Total: 1,461
  - Density: 78.59/km^{2} (203.5/sq mi)
- Time zone: UTC+1 (CET)
  - Summer (DST): UTC+2 (CEST)
- Postal code: 3110
- Area code: 02741
- Website: http://www.neidling.at

Neidling is a town in the district of Sankt Pölten-Land in the Austrian state of Lower Austria.

== Population ==
Historical population
Year	Pop.	±%
1971	1,093	—
1981	1,200	+9.8%
1991	1,299	+8.3%
2001	1,382	+6.4%
