= Wolfern =

- Municipality
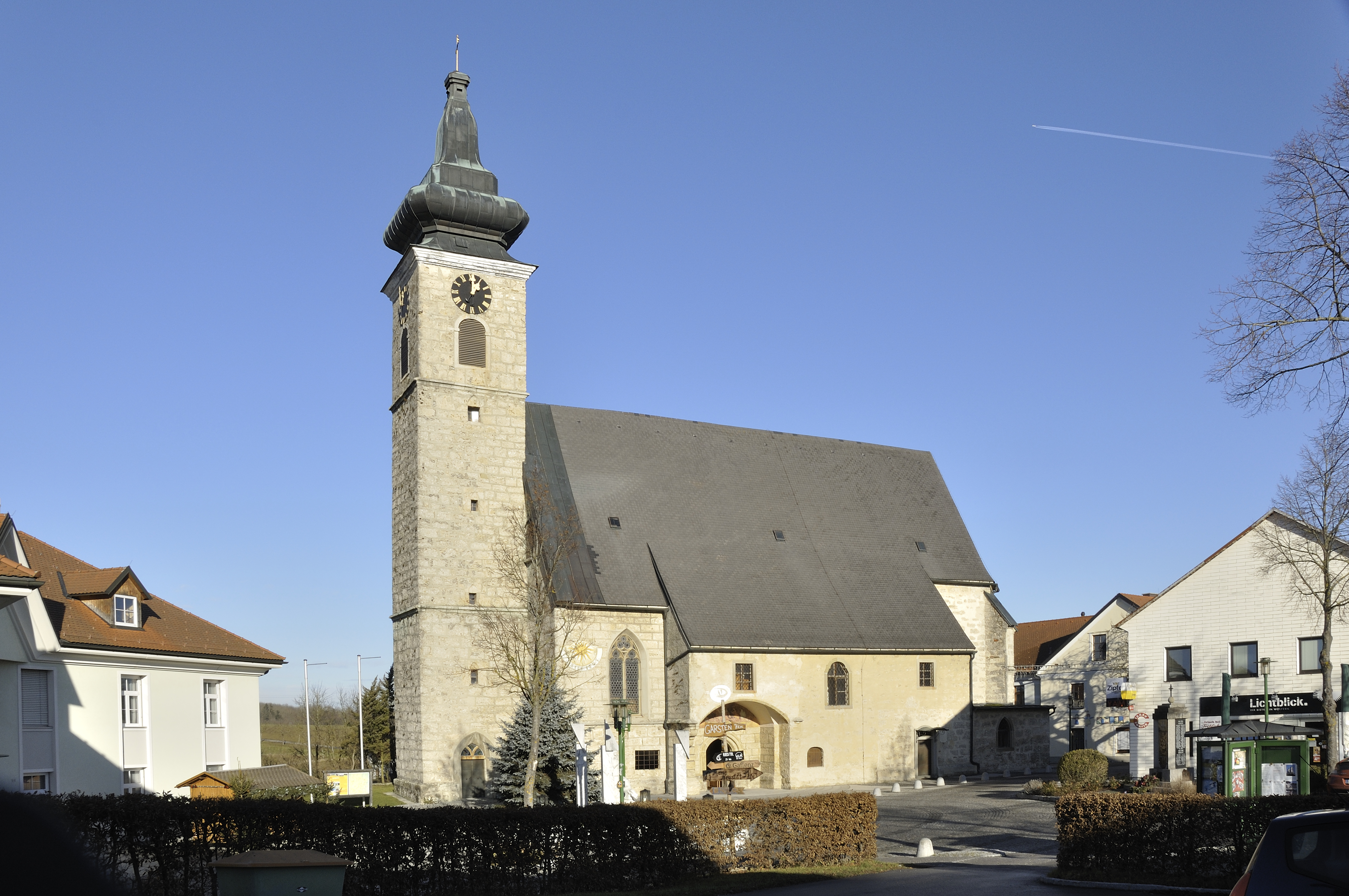
- Catholic parish church of Saint Martin in Wolfern

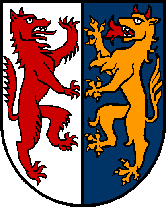
- Coat of arms

- Location within Austria
- Coordinates: 48°05′00″N 14°22′29″E
- Country: Austria
- State: Upper Austria
- District: Steyr-Land

Government
  - Mayor: Franz Schillhuber (ÖVP)

Area
  - Total: 32.58 km^{2} (12.58 sq mi)
- Elevation: 359 m (1,178 ft)

Population (2018-01-01)
  - Total: 3,173
  - Density: 97.39/km^{2} (252.2/sq mi)
- Time zone: UTC+1 (CET)
  - Summer (DST): UTC+2 (CEST)
- Postal code: 4493
- Area code: 07253
- Vehicle registration: SE
- Website: www.wolfern.at

Wolfern is a municipality in the district of Steyr-Land in the Austrian state of Upper Austria. It is a third-order administrative region in Politischer Bezirk Steyr-Land.

== Geography ==
About 14 percent of the municipality is forest, and 77 percent is farmland.
