= Johann Nepomuk Berger (politician) =

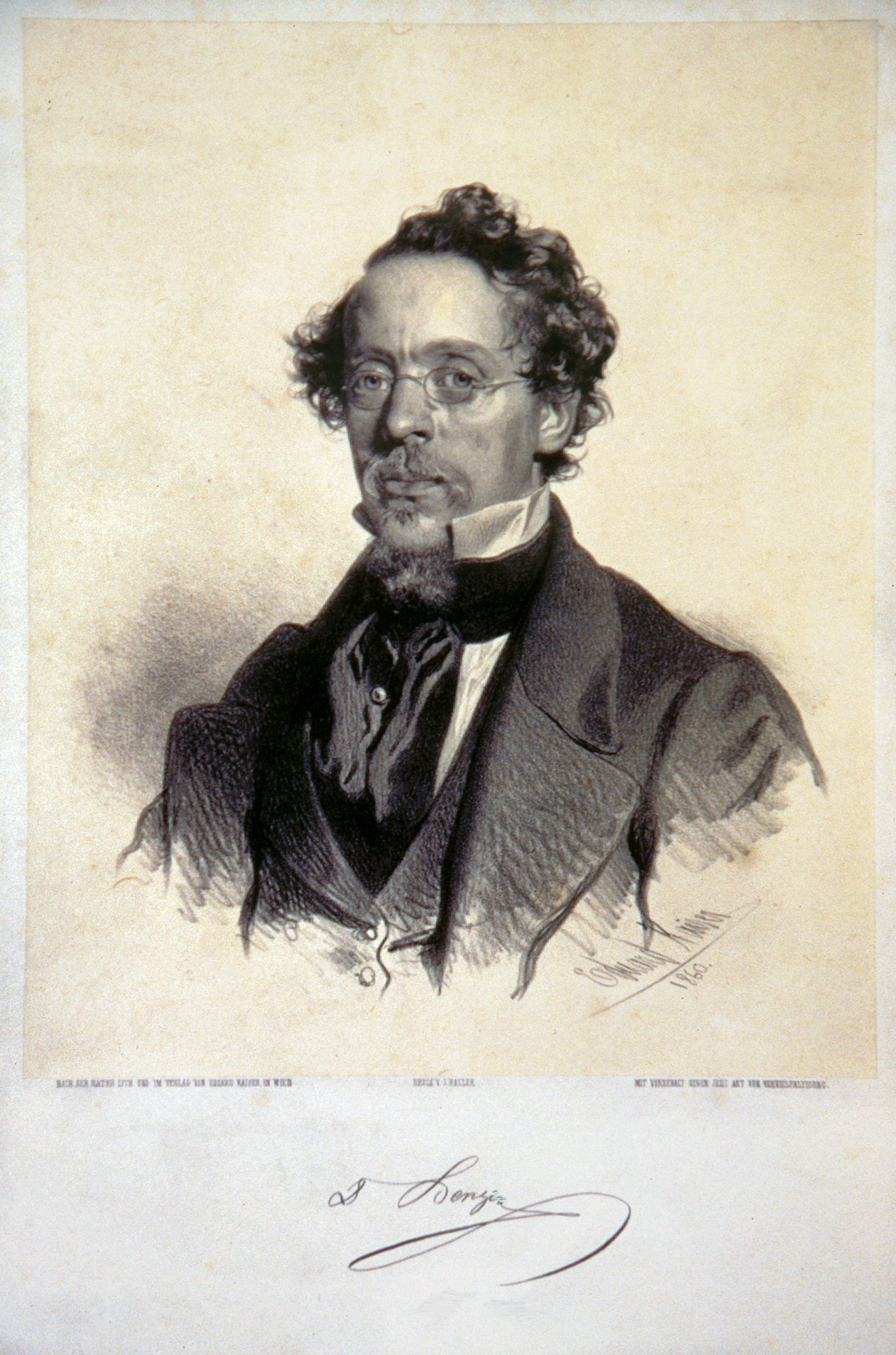
- Lithograph of Berger by Eduard Kaiser, 1860
- Born: 16 September 1816; Prostějov, Moravia, Austrian Empire
- Died: 9 October 1870 (aged 54); Vienna, Austria-Hungary
- Other name: Sternau
- Occupations: lawyer, politician and writer

Johann Nepomuk Berger (pseudonym Sternau; 16 September 1816 – 9 December 1870) was an Austrian lawyer, politician and writer.

== Life and early career ==
Berger was born on 16 September 1816 in Prostějov, Moravia, Austria Hungary. He studied law, mathematics and philosophy at the University of Vienna and received his doctorate (jur. dr.) in 1841. In 1844 he began teaching criminal law and natural law at the Theresianum in Vienna. The following year he began a successful law practice in the same city.

== Political career ==
On 24 May 1848 Berger was elected as a deputy to the Frankfurt National Assembly (Frankfurter Nationalversammlung) till 23 April 1849, as a member of the Donnersberg (radical left), representing Mähren-Olmütz in Moravia and opposed the proposal to offer the title of Emperor to the King of Prussia. He was considered one of the sharpest and wittiest speakers of the extreme left.

For a while he served at the Imperial Court in Vienna as a court lawyer. In March 1861 he entered the Lower Austrian Diet who in turn elected him in 1863 to the lower house (Chamber of Deputies, Abgeordnetenhaus) of the Imperial Council (Reichsrat) as a leading member of the Liberals and was active as a committee member and speaker. Since 1861 he had been a proponent of Dual Monarchy, writing in "Zur lösung der österreichische verfassungsfrage". Under that arrangement in 1867 he was appointed by the Chairman of the Ministers' Conference Minister-President Beust (1867–1867) to cabinet on 30 December as Minister without Portfolio in what was known as the "Citizen's Ministry" (Bürgerministerium) (1867–1870), because the majority were commoners.

Berger was considered to belong to a minority in the ministry, who desired reconciliation with the Slavic nationalities on the basis of direct elections instead of parliamentary delegations. In this minority were Taaffe, Potocki, Berger and Beust (Hayes 1994, 191–226), lined up against Carl Giskra, Eduard Herbst, Leopold Hasner von Artha, Rudolf Brestel and Baron Ignaz von Plener. He resigned on 15 January 1870 from Taaffe's first cabinet (1868–1870) along with Taaffe and Potocki, when their "Minority Memorandum" which Berger had written was rejected by the Emperor. This favoured making concessions to the federalists, but the Emperor favoured the Liberal majority position. He then left politics.

== Legacy ==
In 1894 the 16th district of Vienna (Ottakring) named the Johann-Nepomuk-Berger-Platz in his honour.

== Publications ==
- Die Preßfreiheit und das Preßgesetz (Wien 1848) (Freedom of the press and press law)
- Die österreichische Wechselordnung vom 25. Jan. 1850 (1850) (The Austrian Exchange Regulation of 25 Jan. 1850)
- Kritische Beiträge zur Theorie des österreichischen allgemeinen Privatrechts (Wien 1856) (Critical contributions to the theory of Austrian general private law)
- Über die Todesstrafen (1864) (Concerning the Death Penalty)
- Zur Lösung der österreichischen Verfassungsfrage (1861) (For the solution of the Austrian constitutional issue)

== Sources ==
- Berger, Johann Nepomuk In: Österreichisches Biographisches Lexikon 1815–1950 (ÖBL). Band 1, Verlag der Österreichischen Akademie der Wissenschaften, Wien 1957, S. 72.
- Bascom Barry Hayes. Bismarck and Mitteleuropa. Fairleigh Dickinson Univ Press, 1994. ISBN 9780838635124
- Karl Gottfried Hugelmann: Berger, Johann Nepomuk von. In: Neue Deutsche Biographie (NDB). Band 2, Duncker & Humblot, Berlin 1955, S. 79 f. (Digitalised).
- Franz Philipp von Sommaruga: Berger, Johann Nepomuk. In: Allgemeine Deutsche Biographie (ADB). Band 2, Duncker & Humblot, Leipzig 1875, S. 377–380.
