= Liberalism in Austria =

This article gives an overview of liberalism in Austria. It is limited to liberal parties with substantial support, mainly demonstrates by having had representation in parliament. For inclusion in this scheme, it is not necessary that parties label themselves as liberals.

== History until 1945 ==
In the Austrian Empire, a national liberal current evolved in the 19th century. Liberalism in Austria reached its peak at the time of the 1848 revolution, when civil liberty and a written constitution for the Austrian Empire were key demands of the revolutionary movement. Some time afterwards, Liberals gained some influence on the policies of the government; for example, Anton von Schmerling became Minister for Justice. The liberal Constitutional Party, also known as the "German-Liberal Party", had a majority in the Austrian parliament from 1867 to 1879. It supported the Austro-Hungarian Compromise of 1867, which transformed the Empire of Austria into the Austro-Hungarian Dual Monarchy and the 1867 December Constitution. The panic of 1873 and the Long Depression led to strongly anti-capitalist and anti-liberal sentiments, and the liberal movement in Austria began to decline, with pan-German nationalistic ideas and parties gaining strength at the same time. Later attempts to reorganize liberalism were unsuccessful, with its remnants mostly joining forces with pan-German nationalists.

This traditional association with pan-Germanism was inherited from Austria-Hungary into the Austrian Republic; the Greater German People's Party and the Landbund represented national liberal, anti-clerical, and pan-German voters. Both parties lost ground with the rise of Nazism in the 1930s and were later dissolved by the regime of Engelbert Dollfuss.

== History from 1945 ==
With the foundation of the Federation of Independents in 1949, a predominantly liberal party once again existed in Austria, but it was soon overtaken by nationalist elements and later merged into the Freedom Party of Austria, which was founded in 1955 by former Nazis. The attraction of the party to some of its voters lay in its opposition to both the Catholic clericalism of the Austrian People's Party and to the Marxism of the Social Democratic Party of Austria. Liberal politicians gained control over the Freedom Party during the years from 1980 to 1986, when it was led by Norbert Steger. However, its participation in a coalition under socialist Chancellor Fred Sinowatz brought it to the verge of extinction, which allowed Jörg Haider to take control of the party in 1986.

With the support of the remaining pan-Germans (the appeal of whose own views holds equally little appeal to the Austrian electorate today), he transformed it into a right-wing populist, frequently immigration-skeptic party. The Freedom Party was subsequently expelled from the Liberal International, and the remaining liberals seceded to found the Liberal Forum (Liberales Forum, member LI, ELDR) in 1993. However, when the Liberal Forum lost its seats in parliament in 1999 and became a microparty, liberalism effectively ceased to exist as a political force in Austria.

In 2012, the social-liberal media, especially Der Standard, stated that the Pirate Party Austria could become the new Liberal Forum.

== Today ==
The conservative Austrian People's Party labels itself the party of an open society in its manifesto. The Austrian Green Party, however, holds the most liberal views on social issues. The Alliance for the Future of Austria, which was founded in 2005 as a split-off from the Freedom Party, sometimes considers itself right-libertarian ("rechtsliberal").

Other small parties on the liberal spectrum include the Democrats and the Social Liberals.

However, liberalism today is best represented by NEOS – The New Austria. The party calls itself a movement from the center of society. It was founded in October 2012, and moved into the national parliament less than one year later. In early 2014 – right before starting the election campaigns – they unified with the Liberal Forum and JuLis (Junge Liberale, Young Liberals) and formed NEOS – The New Austria and Liberal Forum.

== Liberal political parties in Austria ==
=== Habsburg monarchy and Austro-Hungarian Empire ===
- 1861: Liberals from various parliamentary factions united in the Constitutional Party (Verfassungspartei), also known as the German-Liberal Party (Deutschliberale Partei).
- 1860s: The large landowners' party split into a feudally conservative wing and a relatively liberal and constitutionalist one, the latter was known as the "Constitutionally Loyal Large Landowners" or "Constitutional Landowners" (Verfassungstreuer Großgrundbesitz) group.
- 1873: A radical faction of the Constitutional Party formed the liberal-nationalist Progressive Club (Fortschrittsklub).
- 1881: Pro-government members led by Franz Coronini von Cronberg (the speaker of the House of Representatives) left the Constitutional Party to form the Liberal Center (Liberales Zentrum).
- 1881: The Constitutional Party merged with the Progressive Club to form the United Left (Vereinigte Linke).
- 1885: The United Left fractured into a liberal German-Austrian Club (Deutsch-Österreichischer Klub) and a nationalist German Club (Deutscher Klub).
- 1888: The remnants of the United Left merged with the moderate parts of the German Club into the United German Left (Vereinigte Deutsche Linke); a little later, the Constitutional Landowners joined the group, too.
- 1896/97: The United German Left broke apart, its Bohemian members left, the Constitutional Landowners re-established their own parliamentary group. The remainder formed the German Progressive Party (Deutsche Fortschrittspartei).
- 1911: Various liberal and nationalist elements merged into the German National League (Deutscher Nationalverband).
- 1917: The German National League broke into many small factions.

=== First Austrian Republic ===
- 1919/20–1934 The agrarian Landbund and the German-nationalist Greater German People's Party each comprised national-liberal factions and ideas.
- 1920: The minor liberal Civic Workers' Party (led by Ottokar Czernin) won a single parliamentary seat. It merged with the equally tiny "Democrats" to form the Civic-Democratic Workers' Party, but remained electorally unsuccessful until it vanished around 1927.

=== Second Austrian Republic ===
- 1949: With the formation of the Federation of Independents, many liberals became active in this party, but were soon marginalized by the nationalist factions.
- 1955: The Federation of Independents merged into the Freedom Party of Austria (Freiheitliche Partei Österreichs, FPÖ) in which the dominance of a larger nationalist over a smaller liberal faction continued. However, the liberal wing (organized in the "Attersee circle") grew, and the FPÖ was admitted to the Liberal International in 1979. After 1986, the FPÖ leadership shifted to right-wing populism and the liberals were marginalized again.
- 1991: Some liberal members split from the FPÖ to form The Democrats (initially called FDP Austria, modelled on the Free Democratic Party of Germany).
- 1993: Liberal dissidents from the Freedom Party of Austria formed the Liberal Forum (Liberales Forum). The FPÖ was pressured to leave the Liberal International and the Liberal Forum "inherited" its membership.
- 2009: The Young Liberals, previously the Liberal Forum's youth organisation, separated from the parent party and ran in the European Parliament election on their own.
- 2012: A group of disappointed voters of different parties formed a new party called the NEOS – The New Austria, taking a broadly liberal platform. Less than one year later, they entered the national parliament.
- 2014: The Liberal Forum and NEOS – The New Austria merged to form NEOS – The New Austria and Liberal Forum. The Young Liberals joined the party and renamed themselves to JUNOS – Young Liberal NEOS.

== Liberal leaders ==
- Anton von Schmerling (1805–1893)
- Baron Ignaz von Plener (1810–1908)
- Prince Karl of Auersperg (1814–1890)
- Adolf Fischhof (1816–1893)
- Eduard Herbst (1820–1892)
- Karl Ritter von Stremayr (1832–1904)
- Ottokar Czernin (1872–1932)
- Herbert Alois Kraus (1911–2008)
- Norbert Steger (1944–)
- Heide Schmidt (1948–)
- Angelika Mlinar (1970–)
- Matthias Strolz (1973–)
- Beate Meinl-Reisinger (1978–)

== Liberal thinkers ==
In the Contributions to liberal theory the following Austrian thinkers are included:

- Carl Menger (1840–1921)
- Ludwig Edler von Mises (1881–1973)
- Joseph Schumpeter (1883–1950)
- Friedrich von Hayek (1899–1992)
- Karl Raimund Popper (1902–1994)

== See also ==
- History of Austria
- Politics of Austria
- List of political parties in Austria
- Austrian School
- National liberalism (Austro-German nationalism)
- Liberalism in Germany
- Liberalism in Switzerland
