= Plener =

Plener is a surname. Notable people with the surname include:

- Ernst Plener (1919–2007), German footballer
- Ernst von Plener (1841–1923), Austrian politician
- Ignaz von Plener (1810–1908), Austrian baron and politician
- Ulla Plener (born 1933), German historian
