= Citizens' Ministry =

Type of ministry in Austria

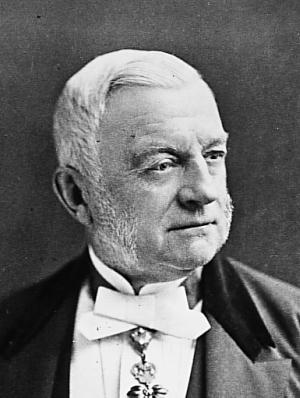
Prince Karl of Auersperg, Minister-President 30 December 1867 – 24 September 1868

The "Citizens' Ministry" (Bürgerministerium) is a term used in a political debate, and later in historical literature. It also applies to the "Doctors' Ministry" (Doktorenministerium). They are used as summary descriptions for the four governments of the Austrian part of Austria-Hungary (Cisleithania), from 30 December 1867 to 4 April 1870, when the government tendered its resignation, and was dismissed on 12 April 1870. These were the initial administrations after the Austro-Hungarian Compromise (Ausgleich) of 1867 that divided the empire's internal administration.

These were the ministries of Prince Karl of Auersperg (30 December 1867 – 24 September 1868), Taaffe (24 September 1868 – 15 January 1870), Baron Ignaz von Plener (15 January 1870 – 1 February 1870), and Leopold Hasner von Artha (1 February 1870 – 12 April 1870), during which the composition of the cabinet changed slightly. Cabinet members were drawn mainly from the German-Liberal Party. The Citizens' Ministry pursued a liberal political agenda, but failed in 1870 due to their inability to adequately manage the tensions between the many nationalities. When Hasner refused Emperor Franz Josef I's request to dissolve the uncooperative regional Diet Assemblies, he resigned, bringing the Bürgerministerium to an end.

== Etymology ==
The term Bürgerministerium, which may be translated as "citizens' ministry" or "bourgeois ministry" (the German term Bürger should be understood in its double meaning: both citoyen and bourgeois), refers to four of the nine members of the Auersperg government. They were drawn from the bourgeoisie, rather than nobility, while Plener had been knighted eleven years earlier. The majority of ministers were therefore commoners, a novelty at the time.

The term "Doctors' Ministry" refers to the five members who had obtained doctorates. The other three (Auersperg, Taaffe and Plener) had law degrees. Thus the proportion of graduates among the ministers was very high, also a novelty.

== Members ==
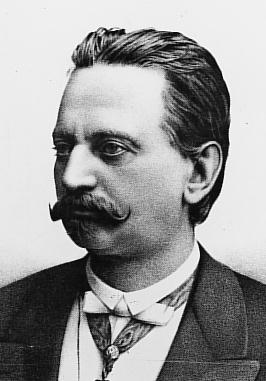
Count Eduard Taaffe, Minister-President 24 September 1868 – 15 January 1870

On 30 December 1867, Emperor Franz Joseph I proclaimed the former President of the Upper House of the Imperial Council (Reichsrat), Prince Karl von Auersperg, as minister-president of the Cisleithanian part of the empire, or formally, the "President of My Council of Ministers of the Kingdoms and Lands represented in the Imperial Council" (Präsidenten Meines Ministerrates der im Reichsrat vertretenen Königreiche und Länder). After conflicts in the cabinet over concessions to various nationalities and ethnic groups represented in the Council of Ministers, he resigned in protest on 4 September 1868. Although an advocate of centralism, he agreed to negotiations with the Czechs in order to win their participation in the Imperial Council. In his view, Taaffe and Foreign Minister Friedrich Ferdinand von Beust (30 December 1867 – 8 November 1871) made excessive concessions to the Czech National Party. He was succeeded by Eduard Taaffe until 15 January 1870 and then Plener and Hasner.

The Ministry proclaimed by the Emperor on 30 December 1867 consisted of;

- Minister-president (Ministerpresident): Prince Karl of Auersperg
- Deputy Prime Minister (Stellvertreter des Ministerpresidenten), National Defense (Landesverteidigung) and Public Security: Count Eduard Taaffe (previously Minister of the Interior (Innenminister), from 24 September 1868)
- Interior (Innenminister): Dr. Carl Giskra (previously President of the Lower House of the Imperial Council – President des Abgeordnetenhauses des Reichsrates)
- Finance (Finanzminister:): Dr. Rudolf Brestel
- Justice (Justizminister): Prof. Eduard Herbst
- Agriculture (Ackerbauminister): Count Alfred Potocki (dismissed 15 January 1870)
- Commerce (Handelsminister): Count Ignaz Edler von Plener
- Culture and Education (Minister für Kultus und Unterricht): Dr. Hasner Leopold Ritter von Artha
- Minister without portfolio (Minister ohne Portefeuille): Dr. Johann Nepomuk Berger (dismissed 15 January 1870)

Taaffe, Potocki and Berger became the minority over their support of federalism and eventually resigned in 1870 when the Emperor did not support them and their "Minority Memorandum".

== Sources ==
- Eintrag zu Bürgerministerium in: Austria-Forum, dem österreichischen Wissensnetz – online (auf AEIOU)
- Thomas Kletečka, Stefan Malfèr: Die Protokolle des österreichischen (cisleithanischen) Ministerrates 1867–1918; Band II: 1868–1871
- Meyers Konversations-Lexikon, 5. Auflage, 13. Band, Bibliographisches Institut, Leipzig und Wien 1896, S. 320 f.
- Eduard von Wertheimer: Feuilleton. Die Entstehungsgeschichte des österreichischen Bürgerministeriums im Jahre 1867. Nach ungedruckten Aufzeichnungen. (Teil I). In: Neue Freie Presse, Morgenblatt (Nr. 20575/1921), 9. Dezember 1921, S. 1 ff. (Online bei ANNO),
  - (Teil II). In: Neue Freie Presse, Morgenblatt (Nr. 20583/1921), 17. Dezember 1921, S. 1 f. (Online bei ANNO),
  - (Teil III und Schluss). In: Neue Freie Presse, Abendblatt (Nr. 20586/1921), 20. Dezember 1921, S. 3 f. (Online bei ANNO).
