= United Left (Austria) =

United Left Vereinigte Linke
- Founded: 1881
- Dissolved: 1885
- Preceded by: VP
- Succeeded by: German-Austrian Club
- Ideology: Liberalism (Austrian); Centralism; Progressivism; Anti-clericalism; Austro–German nationalism
- Political position: Left-wing

The United Left (German: Vereinigte Linke) was a political party in Cisleithania, which existed from 1881 to 1885, which was liberal and centralist in orientation. Its members were mainly the German bourgeois class and some progressive-leaning German aristocrats.

== History ==
There was a growing polarization between Taaffe's Conservative Federalist government, which had been in office since 1879, and the German liberal opposition. This led the various groups of the German liberal opposition to found a common party. In the fall of 1881 they formed the United Left.

In the late 1870s, the Taaffe's government came to power in Cisleithania, combining Conservative and Federalist forces with the help of Czechs and Poles and relegating the Constitutionalist Liberals to opposition for a long time. The constitutionalist camp responded to this reversal of power by attempting to unify into a more actionable opposition bloc. In November 1881, therefore, the Parliamentary Club Vereinigte Linken was founded. On 21 November 1881, it was reported that 110 deputies had already joined the new parliamentary fraction, according to data from 26 November, the club should soon have 147 members. Another source from the same days puts the current number of members at 138. In any case, it included a large part of the constitutionalist camp.

The group around Franz Coronini von Cronberg, who later formed his own parliamentary faction called Club Coronini (officially the Liberal Center Club), remained on the sidelines. The United Left joined the Imperial Council election in 1885 and won, according to preliminary estimates immediately after the election, 129 mandates.

After the 1885 elections, which meant the final loss of the former majority of German liberals in the Reichsrat, the United Left split into two parties. A strong minority of the deputies of the former United Left formed the German Club. Its members renounced the liberals' earlier claim as a state party above nationalities and in the future explicitly represented German interests in the Habsburg monarchy. Thereafter, the remaining United Left deputies formed the German-Austrian Club.

In 1888 the German Club and the German-Austrian Club merged again to form the German United Left.

== Literature ==
- Lothar Höbelt: Cornflower and Imperial Eagle. The German Liberal Parties in Old Austria 1882-1918. Publishing house for history and politics, Munich 1993.
