= Eduard von Grebmer zu Wolfsthurn =

Austrian politician (1821–1875)

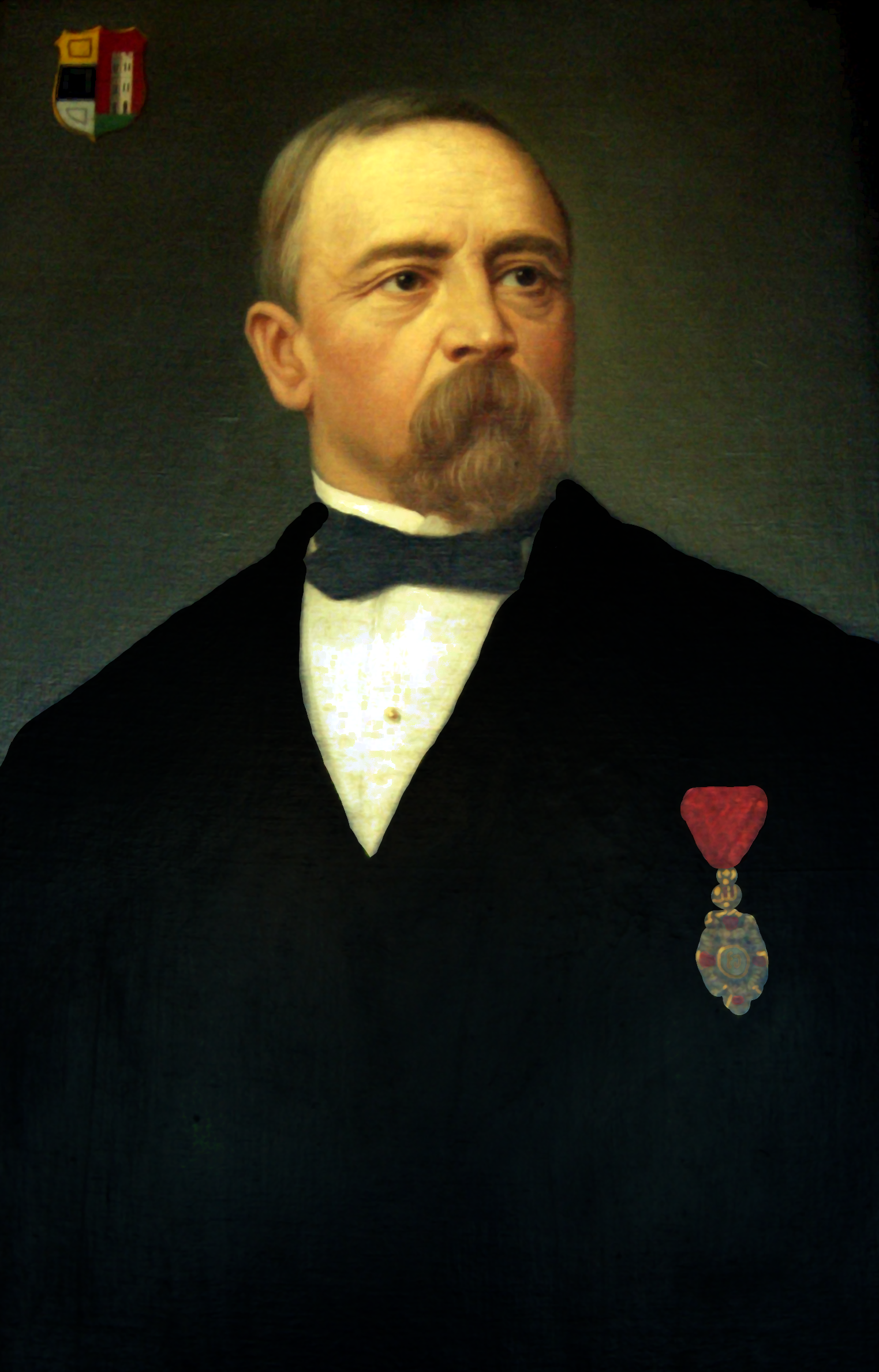

Member of the Imperial Council
- In office 1861–1865
- In office 1873–1875

Member of the Tyrolean Landtag
- In office 1861–18??

Landeshauptmann of Tyrol
- In office 24 September 1869 – August 1871
- Preceded by: Johann Haßlwanter
- Succeeded by: Franz von Rapp

Personal details
- Born: 24 January 1821 Dietenheim, Bruneck, Austrian Empire
- Died: 11 January 1875 (aged 53) Bruneck, Austria-Hungary
- Party: German-Liberal Party
- Education: University of Graz; University of Innsbruck; University of Padua
- Profession: Politician, lawyer

Military service
- Allegiance: Austrian Empire
- Rank: Captain
- Unit: 1st Bruneck Rifle Company
- Battles/wars: First Italian War of Independence; Insurrection in Cadore

Eduard von Grebmer zu Wolfsthurn (24 January 1821 – 11 January 1875) was an Austrian politician and lawyer. He was a member of the Imperial Council and the Landeshauptmann of Tyrol, as well as mayor of Dietenheim and Bruneck.

== Biography ==
=== Education and early career ===
He was born on 24 January 1821 in Dietenheim, Bruneck, Austrian Empire. He studied law at the University of Graz, University of Innsbruck, and University of Padua, earning a doctorate. During the revolutions of 1848 he was a captain of the volunteer 1st Bruneck Rifle Company, and distinguished himself during the Insurrection in Cadore. In 1848 he also became the mayor of Dietenheim. In 1850 he moved to Bruneck, where he took over his father's law office and the Hotel zur Post, including the post office and surrounding farm. This also made him Imperial and Royal Postmaster. In 1861, official documents listed him as a landowner living in Bruneck.

=== Political career ===
In 1861, he was elected mayor of Bruneck and a member of the Tyrolean provincial parliament. The latter delegated him to the Imperial Council, representing the curia of rural municipalities, districts Bruneck and Taufers. He was a member of the German-Liberal Party. As a supporter of religious freedom, he was against the clergy's demand for legal religious unity and against the suppression of non-Catholic religious communities. Personally, however, he was a staunch Catholic. In 1867 he was appointed deputy governor and on 24 September 1869 he was finally elected governor (Landeshauptmann) of Tyrol. As a liberal, he was a member of the minority in the provincial parliament, as the majority of the members of parliament were catholic conservatives. He held this office until the dissolution of the provincial parliament in 1871. In 1873 he was re-elected to the Imperial Council, representing the municipal curia and the chambers of commerce and trade, districts Bozen, Meran and Glurns. He became chairman of the Progressive Club in the Imperial Council. He held these positions until his death in 1875.

== Legacy ==
In 1864, he co-founded the Bruneck volunteer fire brigade, the first of its kind in South Tyrol. In 1878, a monument to Eduard von Grebmer zu Wolfsthurn was erected on the moat opposite the town hall in Bruneck in recognition of his services to the town and the province.
