= Franz Coronini von Cronberg =

Austrian politician (1833–1901)

Imperial Count Franz Coronini von Cronberg
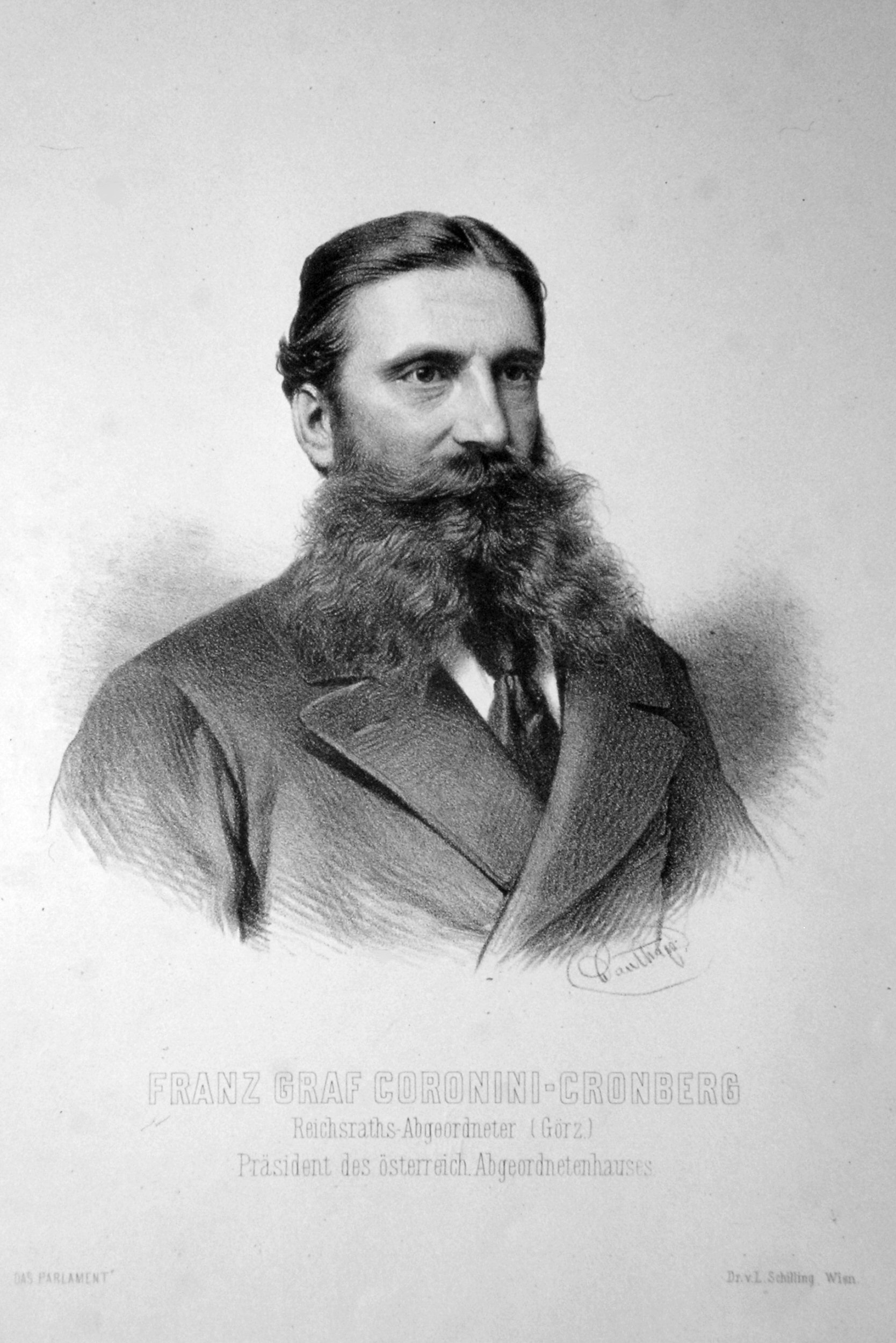

Governor of the Princely County of Gorizia and Gradisca
- In office 1870–1877
- Succeeded by: Luigi Pajer de Monriva
- In office 1883–1899
- Succeeded by: Luigi Pajer de Monriva

President of the House of Deputies
- In office 14 October 1879 – 1881
- Preceded by: Karl Rechbauer
- Succeeded by: Franz Smolka

Member of the House of Deputies
- In office 1871–1895

Member of the House of Lords
- In office 1897–1901

Personal details
- Born: 18 November 1833 Gorizia, Austrian Empire
- Died: 25 August 1901 (aged 67) Šempeter pri Gorici, Austria-Hungary

Military service
- Rank: Colonel
- Unit: 2nd Cuirassier Regiment
- Battles/wars: Battle of Königgrätz

Count Franz Coronini von Cronberg (* 18 November 1833, Gorizia; † 25 August 1901, St. Peter Castle, Gorizia) was an Austrian politician from the House of Coronini von Cronberg.

== Life ==
Franz Coronini von Cronberg was educated alongside Eduard von Taaffe and Emperor Franz Joseph. He initially studied philosophy and law. He joined a dragoon regiment in 1850, became a major in the Auxiliary Corps in 1859, a lieutenant colonel in the 2nd Cuirassier Regiment in 1865, distinguished himself in the Battle of Königgrätz, and retired as a colonel in 1867.

He moved back to Gorizia, where he was appointed Governor of the Princely County of Gorizia and Gradisca in 1870 and held this office (with interruption) until 1899. He was elected a member of the provincial parliament and, in 1871, a member of the House of Deputies. He initially belonged to Johann Nepomuk Berger's Club of the Left, but during negotiations on the second Compromise, he joined the Progressive Club, which elected him as its chairman. He separated from it in 1878, as he was an ardent annexationist and firmly approved of Andrássy's Balkan policy, in particular the occupation of Bosnia, and also supported it as president of the delegation.

He was elected President of the House of Deputies on 14 October 1879, but resigned in March 1881 due to disagreements with the Constitutional Party. He formed a pro-government Liberal Center Club in the House of Deputies. In 1895 he resigned his seat in the House of Deputies and in 1897 he was appointed a member of the House of Lords.

== Family ==
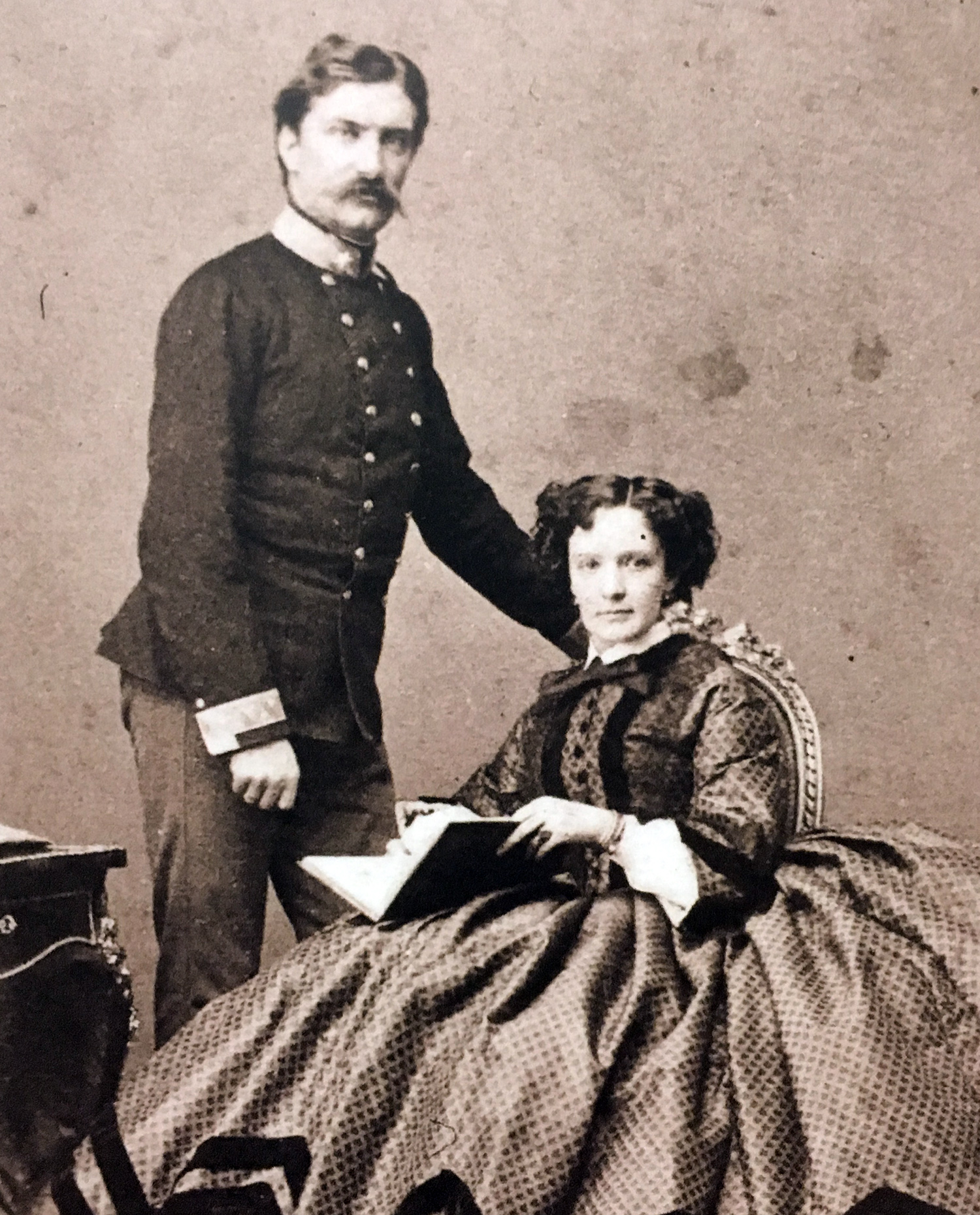
Franz and Selma Coronini-Cronberg

He married Anselma Sophie, Countess of Christalnigg von und zu Gillitzstein (* 1 September 1832; † 21 October 1919). The couple had five children:

- Rudolf Maria Johannes Alexius, Count Coronini von Cronberg, Baron of Oelberg (* 24 June 1860; † 21 April 1918) ⚭ Marianne Irene Elisabeth Philomena Liberta, Countess of Oppersdorff (* 11 April 1871; † 29 July 1965)
- Anna Maria Sofia Alessandra (* 14 November 1861; † 27 April 1862)
- Anselma (* 1. August 1863; † ?)
- Alberto (* 10. August 1864; † ?)
- Gisella (* 5 November 1866; † 5 January 1868)

== Sources ==
- "Coronini-Cronberg Franz Graf". In: Österreichisches Biographisches Lexikon 1815–1950 (ÖBL). Vol. 1, Austrian Academy of Sciences, Vienna 1957, p. 155.
- Franz Coronini von Cronberg. In: Meyers Konversations-Lexikon. 4th edition. Volume 4, Verlag des Bibliographischen Instituts, Leipzig/Vienna 1885–1892, p. 286.
