= German Liberal Party =

German Liberal Party may refer to one of the following:

- German Liberal Party (Danzig) (German: Deutschliberale Partei) active in the Free City of Danzig during the 1920s and early 1930s
- German-Liberal Party (Deutschliberale Partei), alternative name for the Constitutional Party (Austria), active in the Austro-Hungarian Monarchy from 1861 to 1881
- German Liberal Party (Czechoslovakia), active in Czechoslovakia around 1920

== See also ==
- Free Democratic Party, the main liberal party of today's Germany
