= Otěšín =

- Village
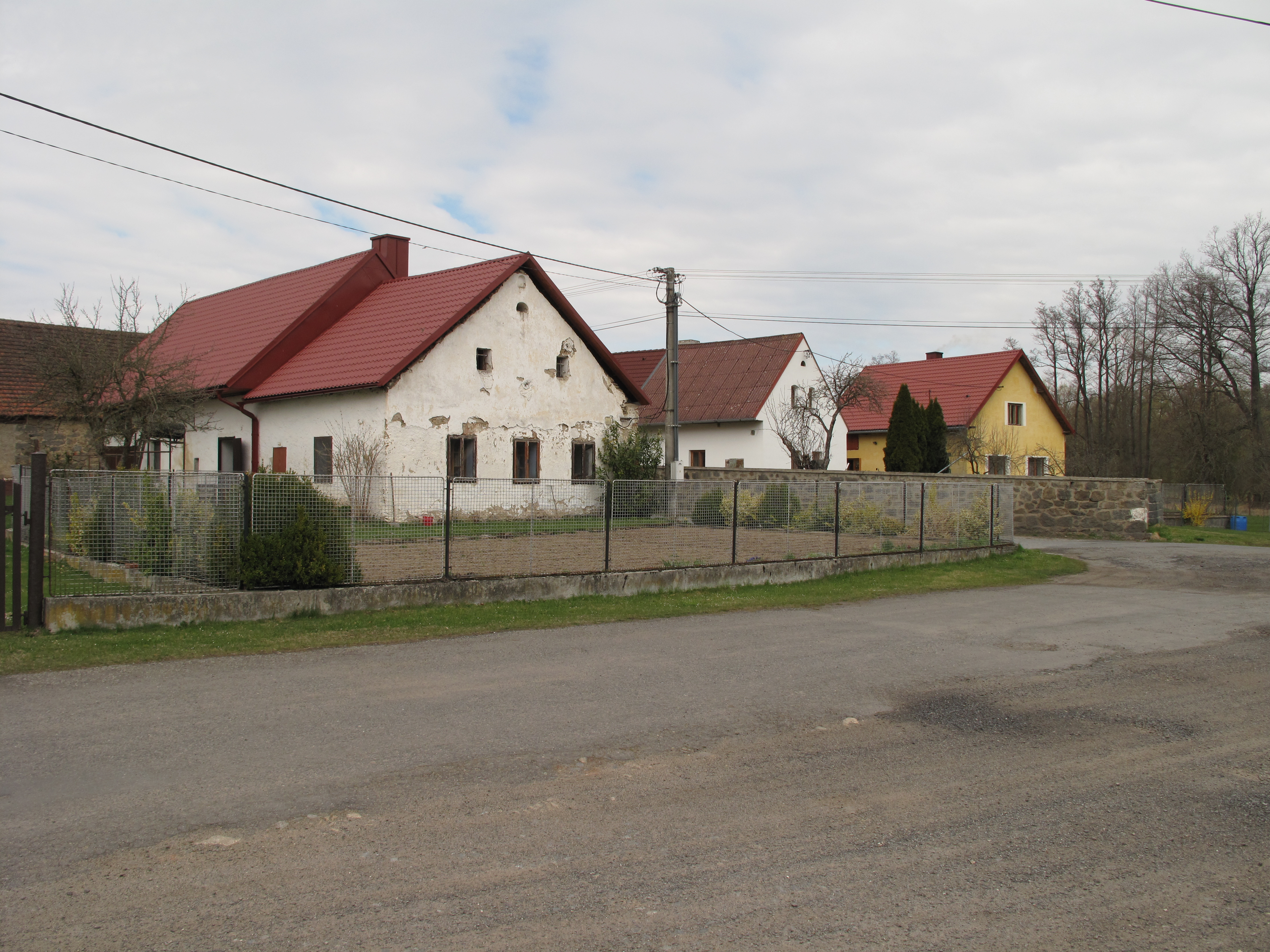
- Houses at the village square

- Location within Czech Republic
- Coordinates: 49.3097222°N 13.5486111°E
- Country: Czech Republic
- Region: Plzeň
- District: Klatovy
- First mentioned: 1404

Area
  - Total: 4.05 km^{2} (1.56 sq mi)
- Postal code: 341 73

Otěšín is a small village in the municipality of Nalžovské Hory in the district of Klatovy, the Czech Republic, located about three kilometers south of Nalžovské Hory. A part of Otěšín lies in the cadastral territory of Miřenice with an area of 4.05 km^{2}, while a part of Sedlečko lies in the cadastral territory of Otěšín. The Černíčský stream flows along the northeastern edge of the village.

== History ==
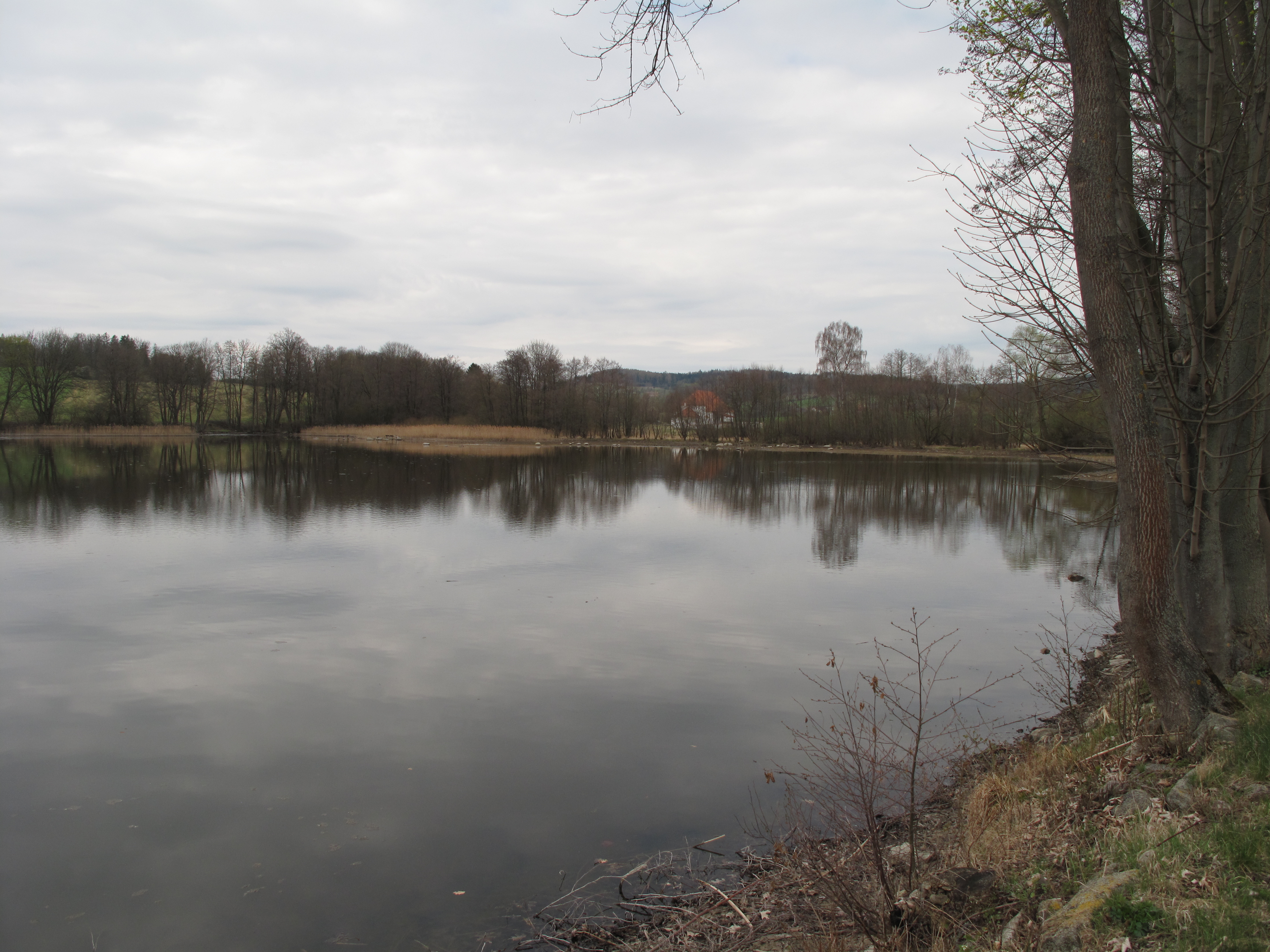
Lehovec pond as seen from the dam

The first written mention of the village dates back to the year 1404.
