= Ulla Plener =

German historian (born 1933)

Ulla Plener (born 12 February 1933) is a German historian and author, known primarily for her work on the history of the German Communist Party and the history of socialism.

== Life ==
=== Family provenance and childhood ===
Ulla Plener was born in Berlin. The Communist Party, of which her parents Kurt and Marie-Luise Plener were both active members, was an early focus of the government of Adolf Hitler drive to create a one party dictatorship. The Pleners had to escape to Copenhagen after Kurt Plener (1905–1980) displeased the authorities with an article he contributed to a Communist Party newspaper in which he explained "how to use sports training as a defence against Nazis" ("... wie man sich sportlich ertüchtigen kann, um gegen Nazis wehrhaft zu sein"). Kurt remained in Copenhagen where he worked for the communist "Red Sport International" organisation and campaigned unsuccessfully for the reversal of the 1931 decision to hold the 1936 Olympic Games in Berlin while Marie-Louise took her daughter to Moscow. In 1940 Marie-Luise Plener (1909–1996) joined the French resistance. Her six and a half-year old daughter and Ulla's younger brother were consigned to a children's home in Ivanovo, a textiles town to the north-east of Moscow. Children at the nursery came from 34 different countries: the common feature was that their parents were all "politically active." Plener later recalled that they were remarkably well informed about Nazi wartime atrocities, partly because some of the children had themselves, with their families, experienced them. Meals were regular if meagre: although starvation was widespread in the Soviet Union during the war, the children at the International Red Aid children's home in Ivanovo never starved.

=== Academic career ===
It was only some time after the war ended that the family were reunited in Berlin. Between 1951 and 1956 Ulla Plener studied History at a Moscow university. She received her doctorate ("Promotion A" under the reconfiguration of academic qualifications introduced in East Germany in 1968) in (East) Berlin in 1969 and her habilitation ("Promotion B") in 1975 for work on the history of the Social Democratic Party between 1945 and 1949. Her dissertation was later published in a shortened version under the title "SPD 1945–1949. Konzeption, Praxis, Ergebnisse". She became a lecturer and head of research at the "Institute for Researching Imperialism", part of the Party Central Committee's Academy for Social Sciences.

"If mainstream opinion in Germany were really to take an interest in the diversity of the anti-fascist wartime resistance and, at the same time, of how critically and self-critically communists deal with its history – including that of communists involved in anti-fascist resistance, then the historian Ulla Plener would be a best seller, included on the lists of the big publishing houses. Her audiences would not be limited to small conferences of academic experts, but would include radio and television listeners. Yet she does her remarkable work almost in secret, without payment from anyone, and is published by niche publishers to whom the word "profit" is foreign. What is special about Ulla Plener's work is the way her analyses connect the general history of the labour movement with the destinies of individuals. Daily human drudgery is thrown into the ring together with the dramatic class struggles of twentieth century capitalism and the appalling manifestations of Stalinism in a single unblinking vision, between which the relationships are handled with care and balance."

"Hätte der Meinungshauptstrom in Deutschland ein wirkliches Interesse an der Vielfalt des antifaschistischen Widerstandes und zugleich daran, wie kritisch und selbstkritisch Kommunistinnen und Kommunisten mit ihrer Geschichte – und also auch der des kommunistischen Antifaschismus – umgehen, wäre die Historikerin Ulla Plener in großen Verlagen und auf Bestsellerlisten zu Hause, und ihre Stimme wäre nicht nur auf kleinen Fachkonferenzen zu hören, sondern auch in Rundfunk und Fernsehen. So aber leistet sie ihre überaus bemerkenswerte Arbeit fast im Verborgenen, ohne Honorar von irgendwem, und publiziert in kleinen Verlagen, in denen das Wort Gewinnzone ein Fremdwort ist. Dabei ist das Besondere an Ulla Pleners Arbeit, wie sie die Analyse der allgemeinen Geschichte der Arbeiterbewegung mit der Darstellung von Einzelschicksalen verbindet. Mit ihren Arbeiten […] bekommt das Geworfensein der Menschen in die dramatischen Klassenauseinandersetzungen im Kapitalismus des 20. Jahrhunderts und die verheerenden Praktiken des Stalinismus ebenso sein je unverwechselbares Gesicht wie das Ringen der Geworfenen, in diesen Verhältnissen würdevoll und nach Veränderung strebend zu handeln."

Wolfram Adolphi in "Das Blättchen", June 2010

The Soviet occupation zone which, in the region surrounding Berlin, replaced Nazi Germany in 1945, was itself relaunched, in October 1949, as the Soviet sponsored German Democratic Republic. Further political changes followed rapidly in 1989/90, leading to German reunification, formally in October 1990. Following reunification Ulla Plener continued with her studies of the Social Democratic movement in Germany during the later 1940s, publishing biographical studies of the trades union leader Theodor Leipart and the postwar SPD and of the party leader Kurt Schumacher. Closely linked with these was her more theoretical research on the theory and practice of "economic democracy".

Another of her research themes following reunification was the wartime French resistance, producing biographical studies of various German women active in the French resistance and a full biography of one of these: her own mother, Marie-Luise Plener-Huber.

Something that would have been impossible before 1989 was Plener's contribution on the Stalin years in Moscow. In 1997 she published "Frauenschicksale unter Stalin" ("The fate of women under Stalin") which was followed nine years later by a "Gedenkband über deutsche Opfer des Großen Terrors in der Sowjetunion" ("Memorial volume on German victims of the Great Terror inside the Soviet Union"). Some of the victims whose fates were set out in this volume were people whose disappearance had, hitherto, been unexplained. The theme of Stalin's purges was one in which Plener had a personal interest. When she was living in Moscow as a very small child with her mother, her paternal grandparents had also been living as political refugees in the city. Her law abiding paternal grandfather was arrested and shot in 1937. Three years later, in 1940, the Soviets returned her grandmother to Nazi Germany following conclusion of the Molotov–Ribbentrop non-aggression Pact. Other relatives suffered, and Ulla's mother, Marie-Luise Plener herself came under suspicion.

She followed this up in 2009 with a biography of Mirko Beer, supported with photographs and documentation covering his time as a military doctor with the republican fighters during the Spanish Civil War. Also of interest is her publication in a single volume of previously unknown diaries and letters covering the final years of his life, 1929–1933, written by the so-called "Communist bandit" or "Red Robin Hood", Max Hoelz.
