= The Social Liberals =

- Founded: 2002
- Ideology: Social-liberalism

The Social Liberals (German: Die Sozialliberalen, SoL) is a minor social liberal political party in Austria. It has never won a seat in a federal election.

== Formation ==
The party was founded and its charter registered and deposited at the Federal Ministry of the Interior, as required by Austrian law, on March 11, 2002. It has not yet contested any Austrian federal election.

== Alliances ==
The debate about the party-programme began in earnest after the controversial 2002 parliamentary elections, which brought to power a centre-right government. The SoL regards itself as a left liberal or libertarian left party with social democratic leftist leanings. The party has contacts with the Italian Radicals, the Belgian Vivant party, as well as the German party Liberale Demokraten – Die Sozialliberalen.

The Social Liberals see an affinity with the Danish Det Radikale Venstre and the Dutch Democrats 66 (D66). The SoL has stated its interest in an alliance with other leftist parties, within Austria and abroad.

== Aims ==
In 2004, the party was led by the lawyer Edith Gagern, Brigitte Mahel and Stephan Neuhäuser.

The Social Liberals have various aims: they see themselves in the tradition of humanism, promoting a life free of ideology or doctrine. They want

1. sustainable development and environmental protection
2. transparency and more streamlining in the political decision-making process, both domestically and in the European Union
3. the introduction of a nationwide basic income
4. a social and just market economy
5. the keeping of Austria's neutrality and a
6. strong engagement for peace-initiatives, human rights, and solidarity with the destitute, refugees, and asylum-seekers.

The Social Liberals also want to see the voting system changed from the current party-list proportional representation to proportional representation, in order to give smaller parties a chance.

== See also ==
- Contributions to liberal theory
- Liberalism
- Liberal democracy
- Liberalism in Austria
- Liberalism worldwide
- List of liberal parties
- Social liberalism
