= Ernst von Plener =

Austrian politician, Minister of Finance 1841–1923

Ernst Baron von Plener (18 October 1841 in Eger, Bohemia – 29 April 1923 in Vienna, Austria) was an Austrian statesman, son of Ignaz von Plener.

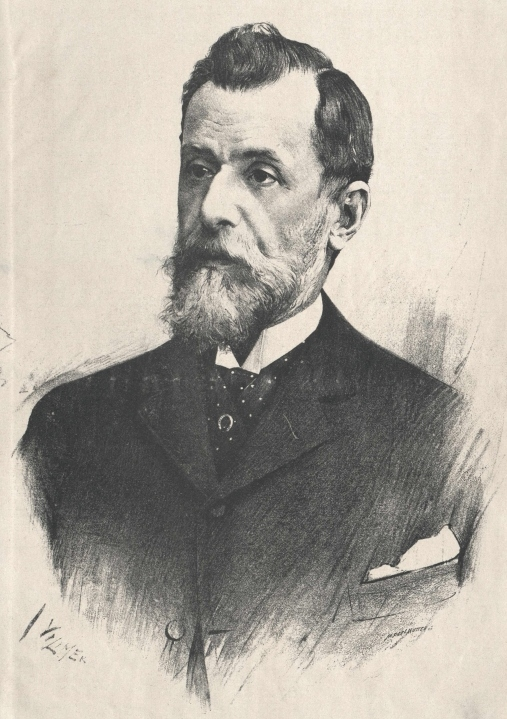
Ernst von Plener, 1897

He was educated at Vienna and Berlin. He served in the diplomatic corps (1865–73) in the Paris and London embassies. He was then elected by the Eger Chamber of Commerce to the House of Deputies of the Imperial Diet (German: Reichsrat) where he joined the Left. He succeeded Herbst as head of the German liberals, both in Prague and in Vienna, and in 1888 was chosen leader of the party called United German Left.

As the acknowledged head of the German liberals in their struggles against the Slav conservative majority in the Diet, he represented Germanism on the nationalities question, but was not averse to concessions compatible with the maintenance throughout the whole monarchy of the position due to the German Austrians. He supported Andrássy's policy in the Balkans in 1878. He sought to compromise the quarrel between Germans and Czechs, and the so-called “points” of 1890, a summary of the bases for a German-Czech understanding, were essentially his work.

From 1893 to 1895, while Minister of Finance in Taaffe's cabinet, Plener reorganized the Austrian and Hungarian mint. In 1900, after five years at the head of the Court of Accounts (German: Oberste Rechnungshof), he entered the House of Lords of the Diet. He became a member of the Permanent Court of Arbitration at The Hague.

== Works ==
Plener wrote on English economic conditions, on Ferdinand Lassalle (1884), and on the Bohemian school and language questions (1886). Titles include:

- Die Englische Fabriksgesetzgebung (English factory legislation, 1871)
- Englische Baugenossenschaften (English building cooperatives, 1873)
- Erinnerungen (Reminiscences, 3 vols., 1911–21)

His speeches were published by his friends in 1911.
