= Žďár (Nalžovské Hory) =

- Village
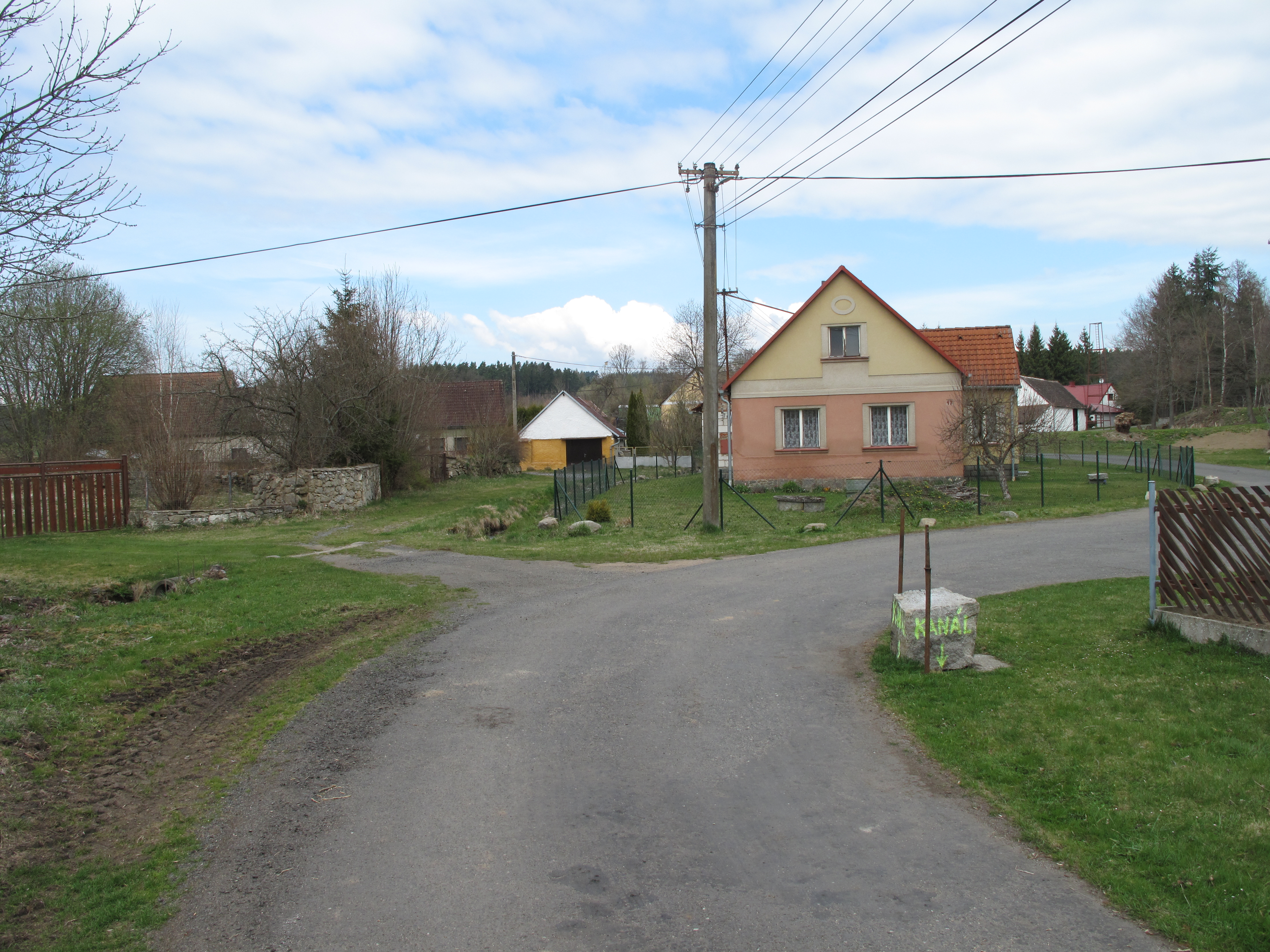
- A cottage

- Location in the Czech Republic
- Coordinates: 49.379167°N 13.555556°E
- Country: Czech Republic
- Region: Plzeň
- District: Klatovy
- First mentioned: 1383

Area
  - Total: 5.18 km^{2} (2.00 sq mi)

Population (2011)
  - Total: 68
  - Density: 13/km^{2} (34/sq mi)
- Time zone: UTC+1 (CET)
  - Summer (DST): UTC+2 (CEST)
- Postal code: 341 01

Žďár is a village and a part of the town Nalžovské Hory in the District of Klatovy, the Czech Republic, located about 5 km north of Nalžovské Hory. The village is located on the road II/186. There are 46 registered addresses in Žďár. In 2011, Žďár had a population of 68 inhabitants.

Žďár is located in the cadastral area of Žďár u Nalžovských Hor, which covers an area of 5.18 km^{2}.

== History ==
The first written mention of the village dates back to 1383.

== Gallery ==
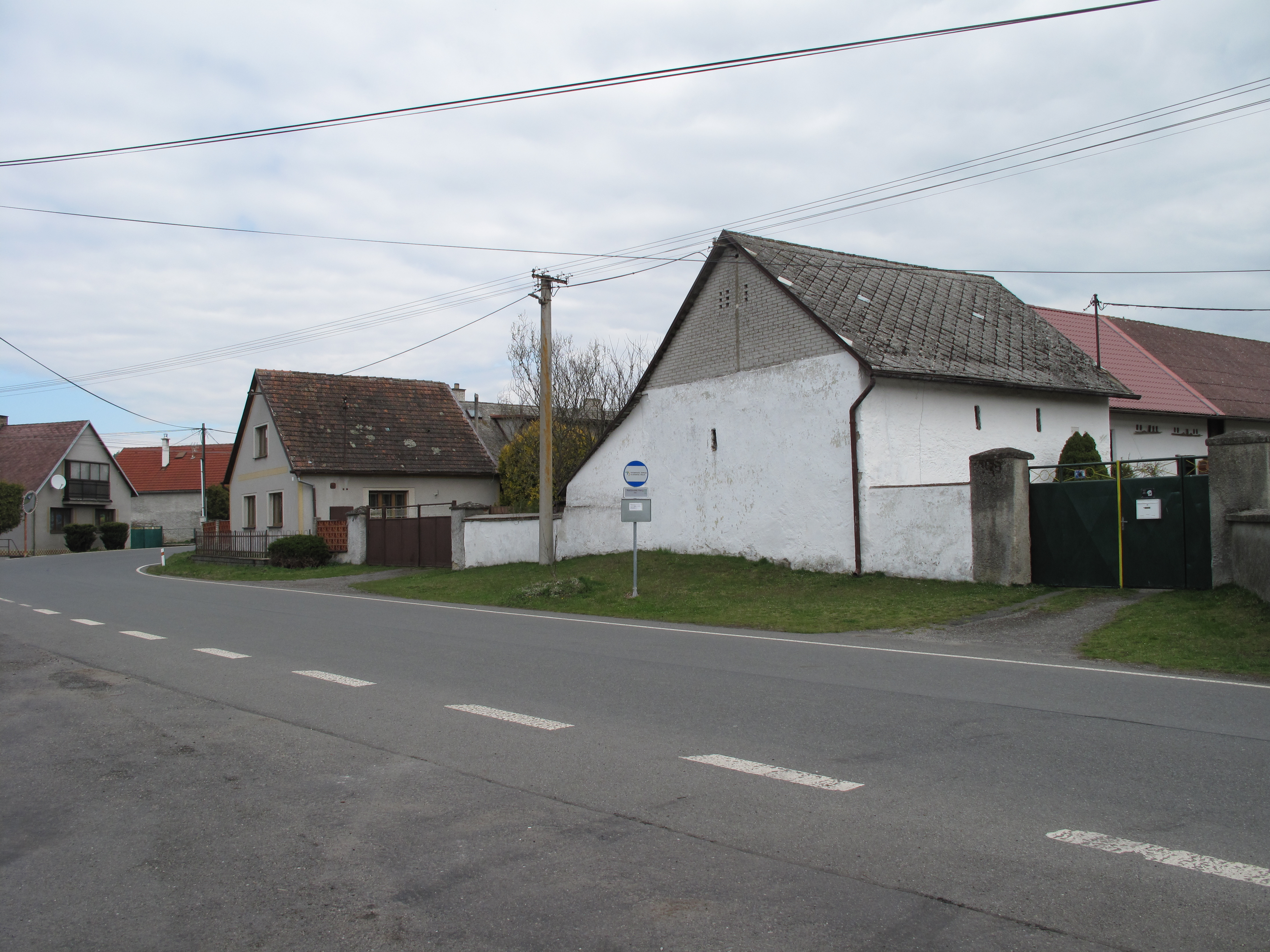
Houses by the main road with a bus stop

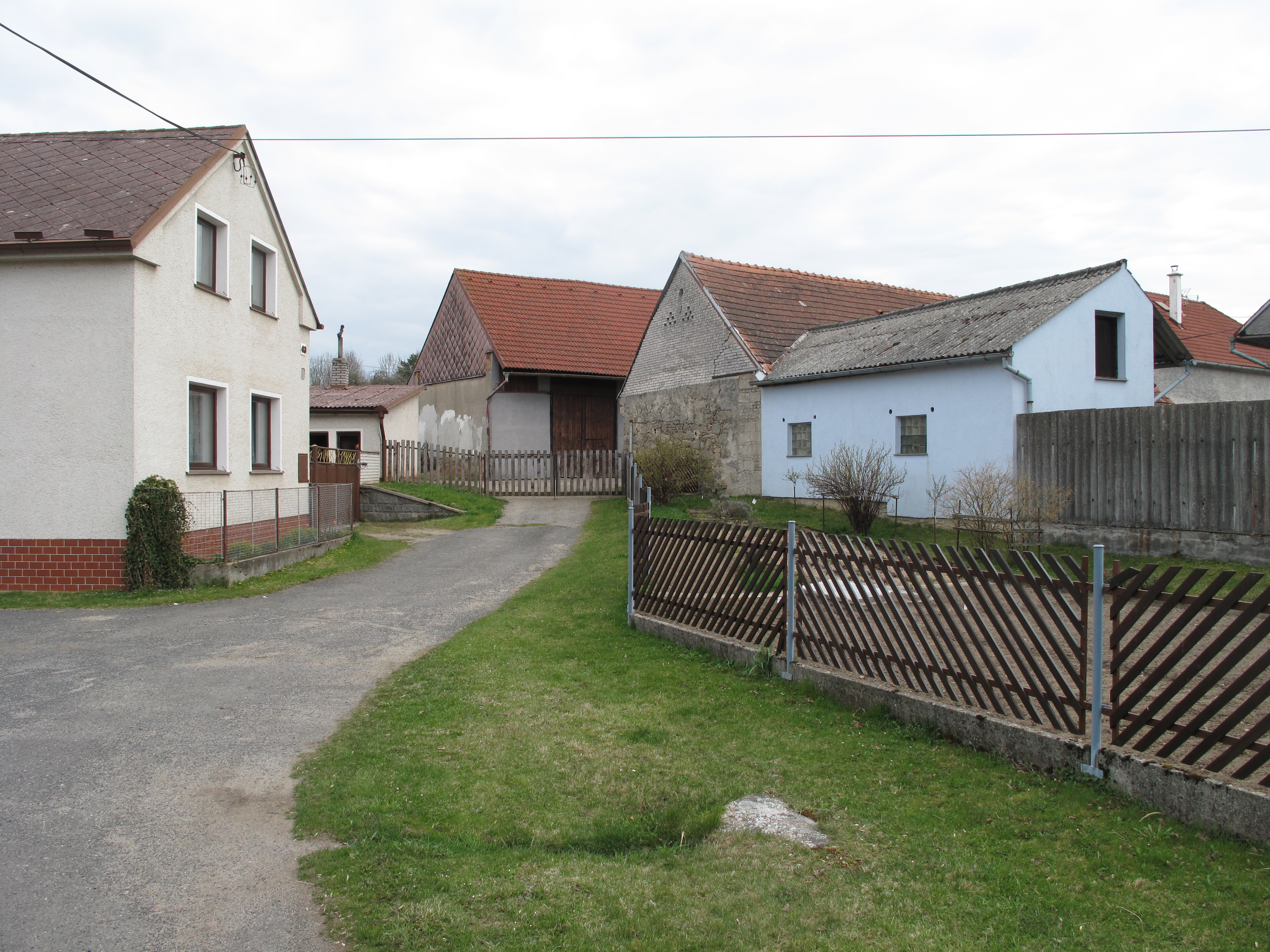
Barns

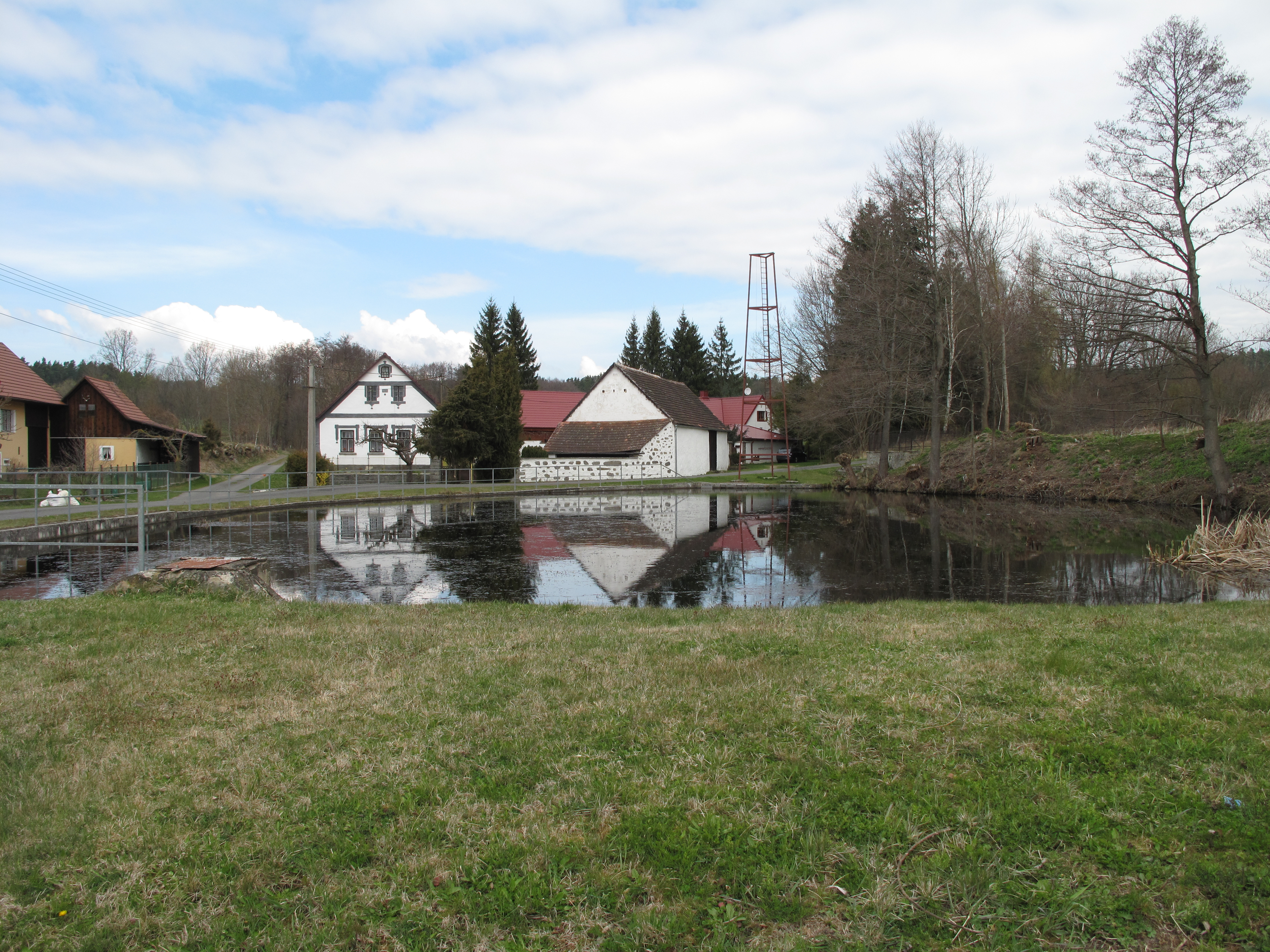
Water reservoir

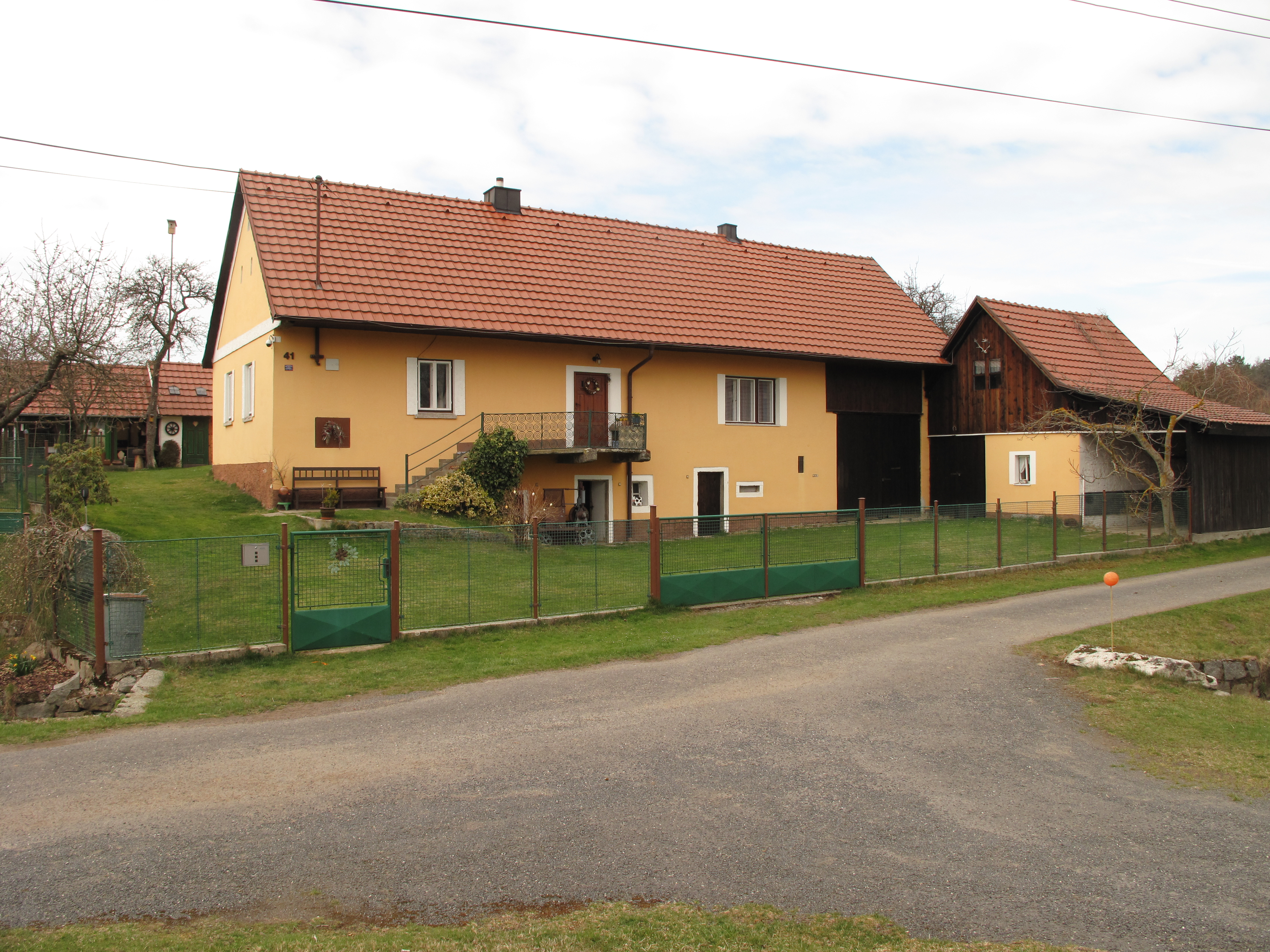
A house
