= Nalžovské Hory =

- Town
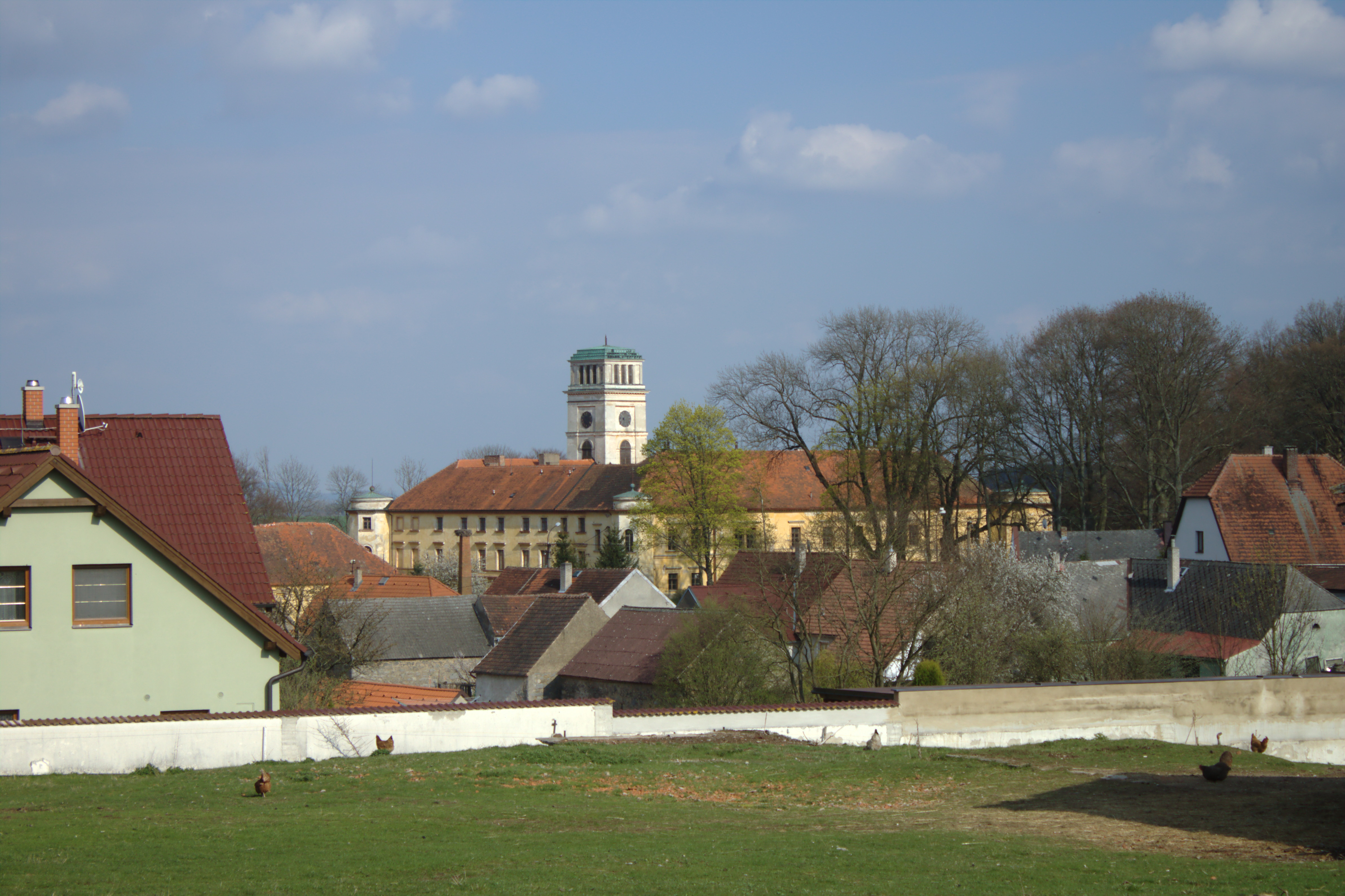
- View towards the Nalžovy Castle

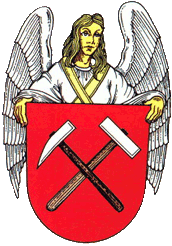
- Coat of arms

- Location in the Czech Republic
- Coordinates: 49°20′10″N 13°32′43″E
- Country: Czech Republic
- Region: Plzeň
- District: Klatovy
- First mentioned: 1952

Government
  - Mayor: Zdeněk Hlaváč

Area
  - Total: 51.29 km^{2} (19.80 sq mi)
- Elevation: 494 m (1,621 ft)

Population (2026-01-01)
  - Total: 1,151
  - Density: 22.44/km^{2} (58.12/sq mi)
- Time zone: UTC+1 (CET)
  - Summer (DST): UTC+2 (CEST)
- Postal codes: 341 01, 341 42
- Website: www.nalzovskehory.cz

Nalžovské Hory (Czech pronunciation: [ˈnalʒofskɛː ˈɦorɪ]) is a town in Klatovy District in the Plzeň Region of the Czech Republic. It has about 1,200 inhabitants.

== Administrative division ==
Nalžovské Hory consists of 13 municipal parts (in brackets population according to the 2021 census):

- Krutěnice (22)
- Letovy (52)
- Miřenice (90)
- Nalžovy (252)
- Neprochovy (30)
- Otěšín (15)
- Sedlečko (1)
- Stříbrné Hory (209)
- Těchonice (42)
- Ústaleč (119)
- Velenovy (215)
- Zahrádka (9)
- Žďár (69)

== Etymology ==
The name Nalžovské Hory literally means 'Nalžovy mountains' and was created after the merger of Stříbrné Hory and Nalžovy. The name Stříbrné Hory (German: Silberberg) means 'silver mountains' in both Czech and German and refers to the silver mining in the area. The name Nalžovy was derived from the place name Lžovy and the phrase na Lžovech ('at Lžovy'). The German name of Nalžovy, Ellischau, only came into existence at the end of the 18th century.

== Geography ==
Nalžovské Hory is located about 19 kilometres (12 mi) east of Klatovy and 45 km (28 mi) south of Plzeň. Most of the municipal territory lies in the Blatná Uplands. A small part in the southwest extends into the Bohemian Forest Foothills and includes the highest point of Nalžovské Hory, the hill Vidhošť at 759 m (2,490 ft) above sea level. The municipal territory is rich in small streams and fishponds.

== History ==
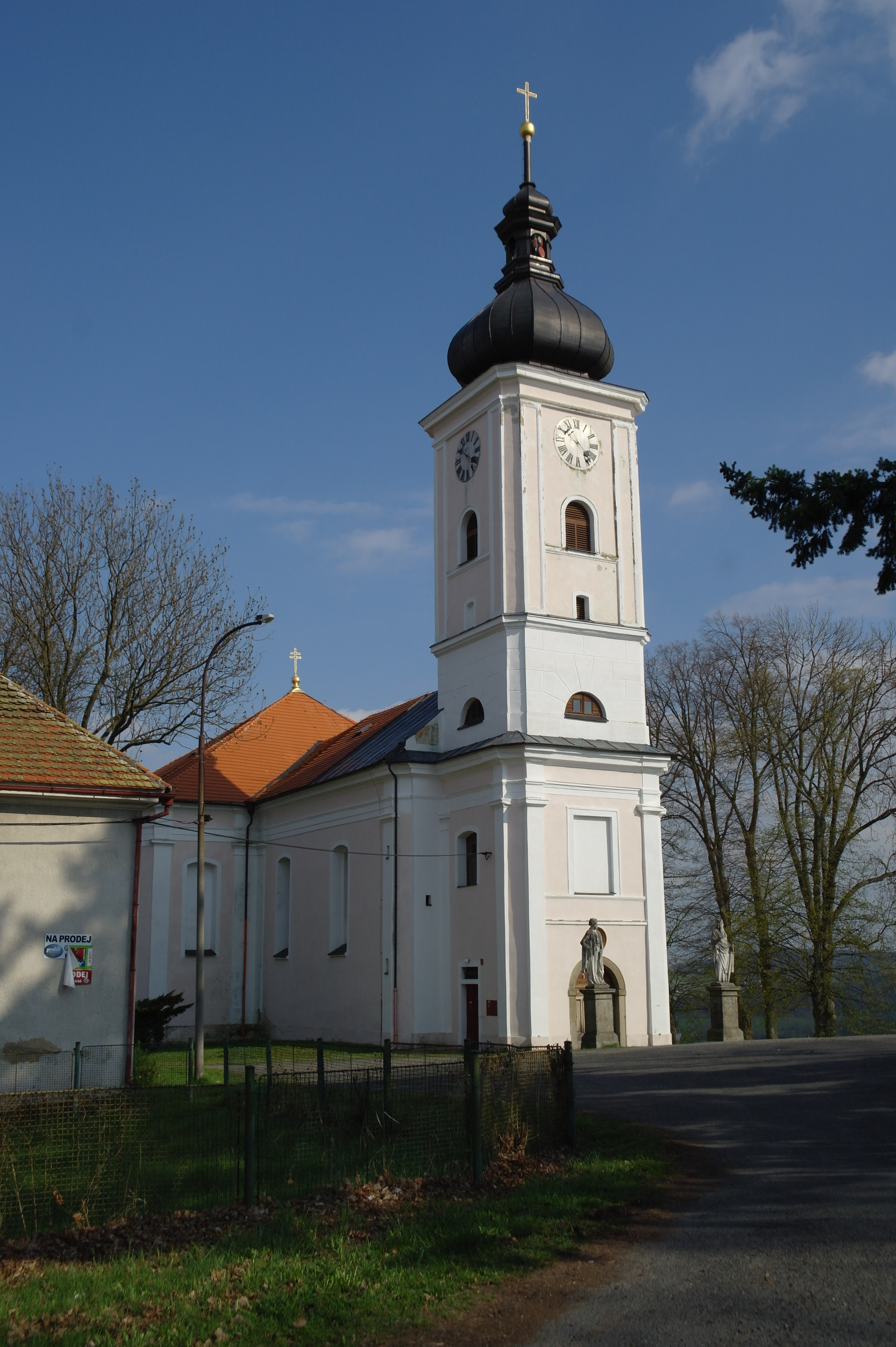
Church of Saint Catherine

The first written mention of Nalžovy is from 1379. Stříbrné Hory was founded in 1521 as a mining settlement and it became a market town in 1530. The mining of silver, lead and tin ended in 1585.

In 1769 the Nalžovy estate was acquired by Nicholas Taaffe, 6th Viscount Taaffe, however, the family memoirs identify his son Francis as the first owner. The Viscounts Taaffe were the most significant owners of the estate. They owned Nalžovy until 1937, when Richard Taaffe sold it to brothers František and Karel Müller.

The Müller brothers were entrepreneurs who reconstructed farm buildings, produced cheese here and cultivated improved varieties of rye and oats. After World War II, their properties were confiscated and the brothers had to emigrate. The castle was returned to the Müller family in 1993, but in 2008 they sold it to a private company.

The municipality was established in 1952 by the merger of Stříbrné Hory with Nalžovy. It regained the town status in 2008.

== Demographics ==
Historical population

Year	Pop.	±%
1869	4,424	—
1880	4,402	−0.5%
1890	4,147	−5.8%
1900	4,082	−1.6%
1910	3,967	−2.8%

Year	Pop.	±%
1921	3,723	−6.2%
1930	3,203	−14.0%
1950	2,298	−28.3%
1961	2,208	−3.9%
1970	1,837	−16.8%

Year	Pop.	±%
1980	1,610	−12.4%
1991	1,397	−13.2%
2001	1,255	−10.2%
2011	1,140	−9.2%
2021	1,125	−1.3%

Source: Censuses

== Transport ==
The I/22 road (the section from Klatovy to Strakonice) runs through the town.

== Sights ==
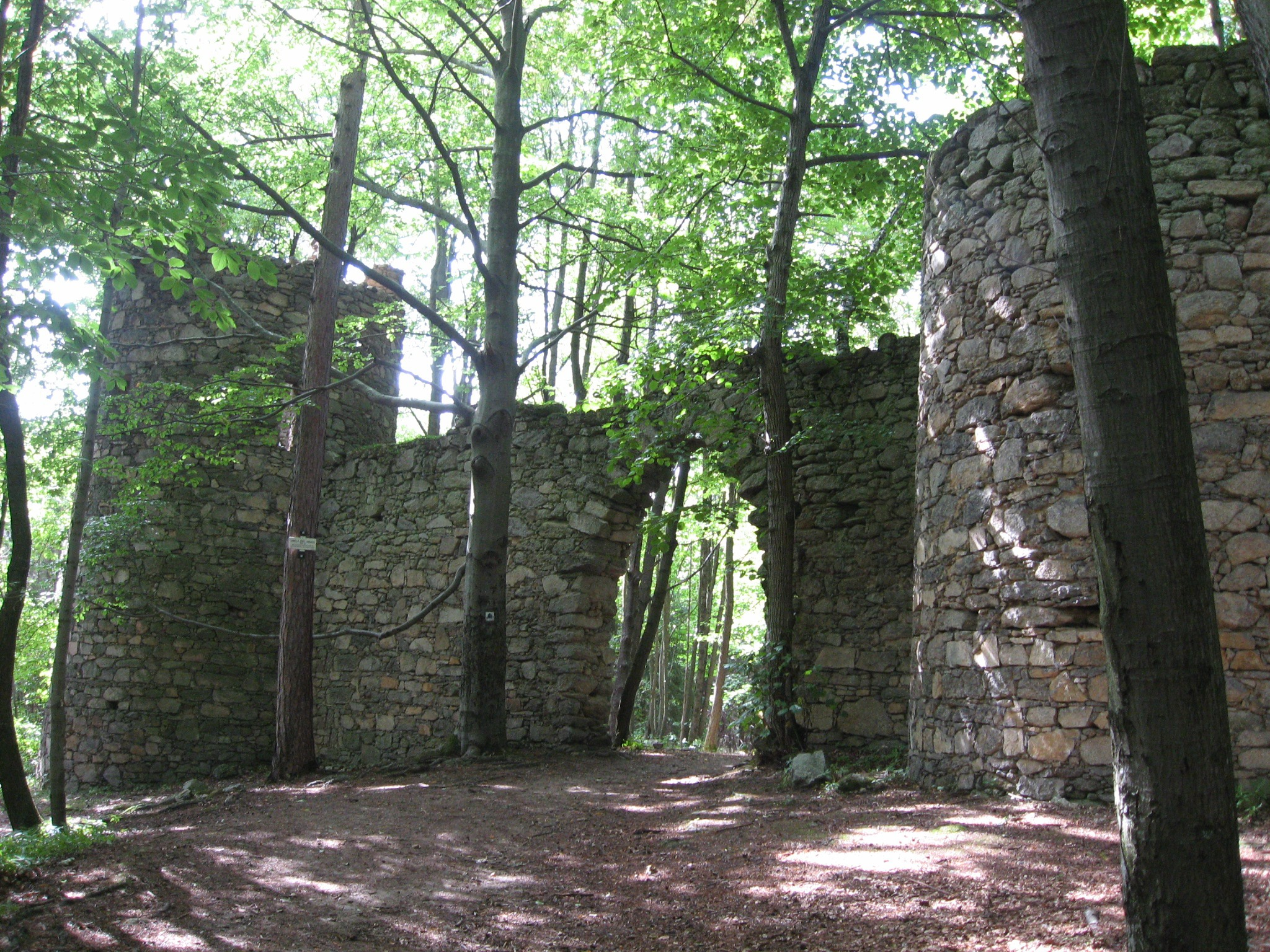
Prašivice Castle

On the site of a former fortress documented in 1380, the Renaissance Nalžovy Castle was built in 1618–1620. In 1745 it was modified in the Baroque style. The castle is surrounded by an English park from the early 17th century with romantic modifications from around 1840. Today the castle and the park are privately owned and inaccessible to the public.

The Viscounts Taaffe had artificial ruins resembling their former Irish family home, Ballymote Castle, built in the nearby forest on the Prašivice hill around 1840. A forest park with stone statues of a dragon and a turtle was created around the ruins.

The Church of Saint Catherine in Stříbrné Hory was built in the Baroque style in 1721–1723. Stations of the Cross next to the church dates from the 19th century.

== Notable people ==
- Eduard Taaffe, 11th Viscount Taaffe (1833–1895), Austrian politician; died at Nalžovy Castle
- Karel Klostermann (1848–1923), writer; attended school in Stříbrné Hory
- Josef Antonín Hůlka (1851–1920), Bishop of České Budějovice
- Richard Taaffe (1898–1967), Austrian-Irish gemmologist
