= Mirko Beer =

Hungarian doctor (1905–1942)

Mirko Beer (20 February 1905 – 4 August 1942) was a surgeon, a military physician and a political activist originally from what is now Serbia. He attracted attention in Spain as a leading military physician between 1936 and 1939, during the Civil War. By 1941 he was living in the Soviet Union. Suspected by the security services of espionage, he was arrested and jailed on 9 July 1941. Still in jail, he was probably shot dead just over a year later.

== Biography ==
Mirko Beer was born into an impoverished Jewish (by religion) family in Senta, a small border town, notable of its ethnic diversity, a short distance from Subotica and roughly equidistant between Budapest and Timișoara. The family was part of the town's Hungarian minority. There were six children, but the other five were all girls: Mirko was one of the youngest. He attended the local gymnasium (secondary school) which prepared him for university admission. He then attended the University of Vienna between 1923 and 1929, studying medicine. According to at least one source, cries of "Heil Hitler" could by this stage already be heard in the university's main auditorium. In 1924 Beer joined the Socialist Students' Society. He became – and would for the rest of his life remain – a committed communist. He read from the literary pantheon works by Marx, Engels, Lenin and Wilhelm Reich. He identified the looming dangers of Fascism and decided that he needed to engage politically. In 1927 he illegally joined the Yugoslavian Communist Party. At around the same time he joined Internationale Arbeiter-Hilfe (IAH / "Workers International Relief" / "Международная рабочая помощь"), a Berlin-based welfare organisation with close ties to Moscow. In 1928 he set up a "Balkan secretariat" for the IAH in Subotica.

Between 1930 and 1932 Beer lived in Berlin. He had been invited to move there by the architect-activist Heinrich Vogeler with whom, initially, he lived in the Hufeisensiedlung (housing estate) together with other socialists, communists and social democrats, in an "alternative residential community". He worked for the Berlin medical service as a physician. The large number of injured workers – Communists and Nazis alike – that he treated in the Friedrichshain Hospital (as it was then known) helped him to appreciate that Fascism in German was already something to be taken seriously. He was also active on the fringes of the German Communist Party. While he was living in Berlin, Mirko Beer met Gerda Schneuer, a political soul-mate and an actress and photographer originally from Hamburg. Their intense personal relationship together endured till Beer's death in 1942. There are references in some sources to their having lived together, after 1939 in Moscow, as man and wife with their little daughter, Öchen.

Accepting an invitation from the Soviet Ministry for the People's Health, in April 1932 he moved to the Soviet Union where he worked as a doctor at a Moscow research institute.

In July 1936, directly after the insurrection against the Republican government which triggered the Spanish Civil War, Mirko Beer traveled to Spain and volunteered to help on the government side. He became one of the leading figures in the medical service. It was common for Moscow-based party activists to use a party pseudonym, and during this period Mirko Beer identified himself as "Dr. Oscar Goryan". Although he was much impressed by the international solidarity and the "almighty struggle in which an unarmed people were being seen to triumph over armede military formations" ("...großartigen Kampf, in dem ein waffenloses Volk ... die bewaffneten Formationen der Armee besiegte"), the aftermath of the Battle of Jarama in February 1937 convinced him of the need for the medical services on the republican side to be strengthened in order to cope with the scale of the casualties. This marked, as written in a report, "the start of a structured war medical corps" ("Beginn einer regelrechten Kriegssanität"). Now his professional expertise came to the fore. He was concerned to make more generally available to republican civil war comrades (and others) the lessons provided by medical experience gained in modern war conditions. That was behind his launch of the journal "Stimme der Sanität" and his book "Puesto de Clasificacion". He served as editor in chief of the journal till January 1938, using it to set forth the difficulties and shortcomings of the battlefield medical services that he was experiencing. However, what comes across most powerfully in most of his own published contributions is his pride in what republican medical corps members were able to contribute after Jarama. Pride resonates in the obituaries of fallen comrades. He was proud of the military doctors who abandoned their comfort zones to work in the field hospitals. He was proud of the "school" for badly unprepared medically qualified recruits to the republican side. He was also proud of the continuing training for the sick and less-badly wounded patients in the field hospitals and of the tailored courses for carers. But several articles also echo a yearning for an end to the slaughter of the war.

"Goryan", as civil war comrades knew Mirko Beer at this time, was widely respected as an exceptional physician, but that did not mean that he was without enemies. André Marty, the French-born communist Political Commissar ("chief organiser") of the International Brigades, wrote in his (at the time strictly confidential) reports that "Goryan" had "wilfully taken to himself control of the internationalists' medical services" and so removed them from "party control". Sources that focus on "Goryan" are content to set aside such criticism, however.

On 8 February 1939, with other "civil war brigadists", Mirko Beer left Spain. The insurgents (identified by international backers such as Joseph Goebbels as "the nationalists") had won. After crossing into France, Beer was interned, and held till May 1939. Although he later described the Argelès Camp as "hellish" ("die wahre Hölle"), he immediately turned his attention to the medical needs of fellow internees. Disease was rampant. After the Spanish fighters were moved to Gurs he headed up the medical support and the "surgical consultancy". In June 1939 he was able to return to Moscow. "Our favourite person was back with us" ("Unser liebster Mensch war wieder bei uns"), his wife, Gerda, later wrote. He returned to his work as a physician, working in an accident clinic, and he also resumed his academic work. It was, perhaps, too good to last.

The German invasion in June 1941 came as a major shock to most Muscovites. Mirko Beer had spent his first nine years in a multi-lingual border town in a multi-cultural empire. From the perspective of Moscow-based colleagues, that made him a brilliant linguist. A few days after the German invasion a comrade-librarian overheard him discussing "with foreigners, in different languages, some of them incomprehensible". (Note: Mirko Beer was fluent in German, Russian, Hungarian and Serbian.) That led to his arrest by the security services on 9 July 1941 on account of "allegedly espionage-linked relationships". According to some sources he was then shot, still in jail, on 4 August 1942. His sister Margit had written letters to Rubén Ruiz Ibárruri and Joseph Stalin pleading his case. It seems unlikely that this letters ever reached their intended addressees. An alternative account of his death surfaced only in June 1990, after several years of Glasnost had led to the opening up of previously secret Soviet records. According to this version, which was passed to his daughter through the German Red Cross, Mirko Beer did actually face a trial at which he received a five year prison sentence, but he died on 11 August 1942, not as a result of being shot, but from Dysentery.
