= Rudolf Brestel =

Austrian politician

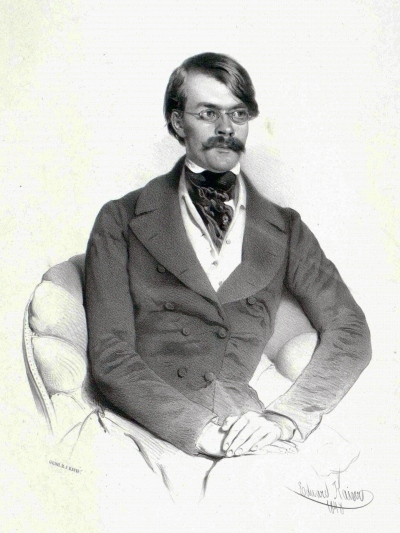
- Brestel in 1848
- Born: 16 May 1816; Vienna, Austrian Empire
- Died: 3 March 1881 (aged 64)
- Occupation: Austrian politician

Rudolf Brestel (16 May 1816 in Vienna – 3 March 1881) was an Austrian politician.

== Life and career ==
Rudolf Brestel was an assistant at the Vienna Observatory from 1836 to 1840 and then taught mathematics at the Universities of Olomouc and Vienna. In 1848, he was elected as a Liberal deputy in the Austrian parliament (Reichstag). After the defeat of the revolution of 1848-1849, he lost his position as a professor and was persecuted for his political views.

He was active in publishing and, in 1856, was Sekretär at the Creditanstalt Bank. In 1861 he was elected to the state parliament of Lower Austria from where he was elected to the Imperial Council from 1864 to 1881. On 30 December 1867 he was appointed by Emperor Franz Joseph I as Finance Minister (Finanzminister) in the so-called "Citizen's Ministry" (Bürgerministerium) under Minister-President Auersperg until his resignation on 4 April 1870 (effective on 12 April). In this capacity, he managed to reduce the deficit through tax increases and conversion of government debt to property debt.

In 1883 Vienna's 16th District (Ottakring) named the Brestelgasse in his honour.
