= Eduard Herbst =

Austrian jurist and politician (1820–1892)

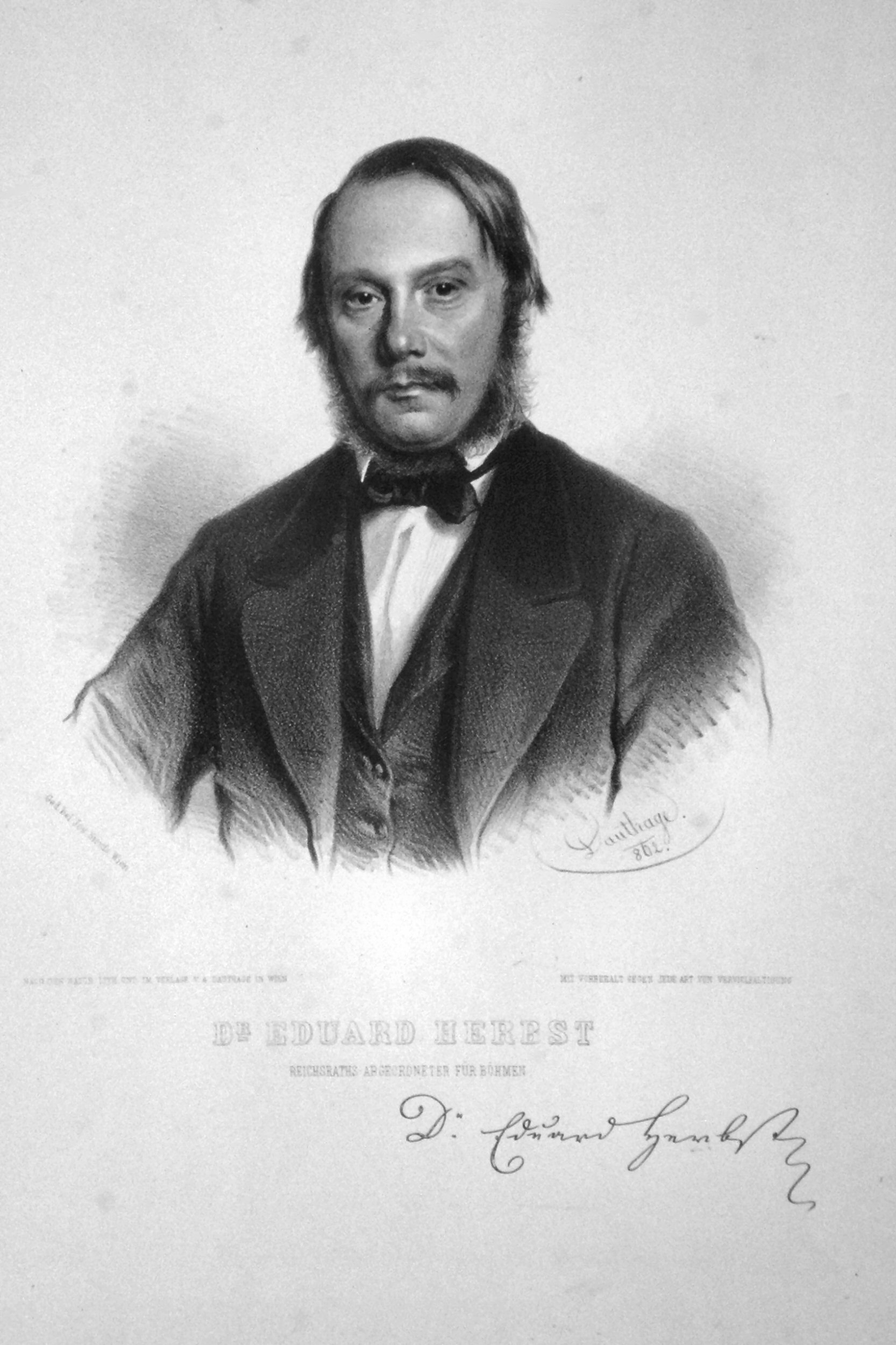
Lithograph by Adolf Dauthage, 1862

Eduard Herbst (9 December 1820 – 25 June 1892) was an Austrian jurist and politician. He served as Minister of Justice in the "Citizens' Ministry" of Cisleithania from 1867 to 1870.

== Life ==
Born in Vienna, Herbst studied law at the University of Vienna and obtained his doctorate in 1843. He commenced civil service and in 1847 became a professor of criminal law and the philosophy of law at the University of Lemberg (Lviv), promoted to rector in 1853. From 1858, he was professor at the Charles University in Prague.

Herbst was elected deputy to the Bohemian Diet in 1861, and, in accordance with the February Patent, was sent by the Diet to the lower House of Deputies of the Austrian Imperial Council (Reichsrat). A gifted speaker and firebrand, he became one of the most conspicuous members of the liberal Constitutional Party in parliament. Herbst had agitated against the Austro-Hungarian Compromise of 1867; nevertheless, after the implementation of the December Constitution, he was appointed Minister of Justice in the liberal cabinet (Bürgerministerium) of Cisleithanian minister-president Prince Karl of Auersperg on December 30.

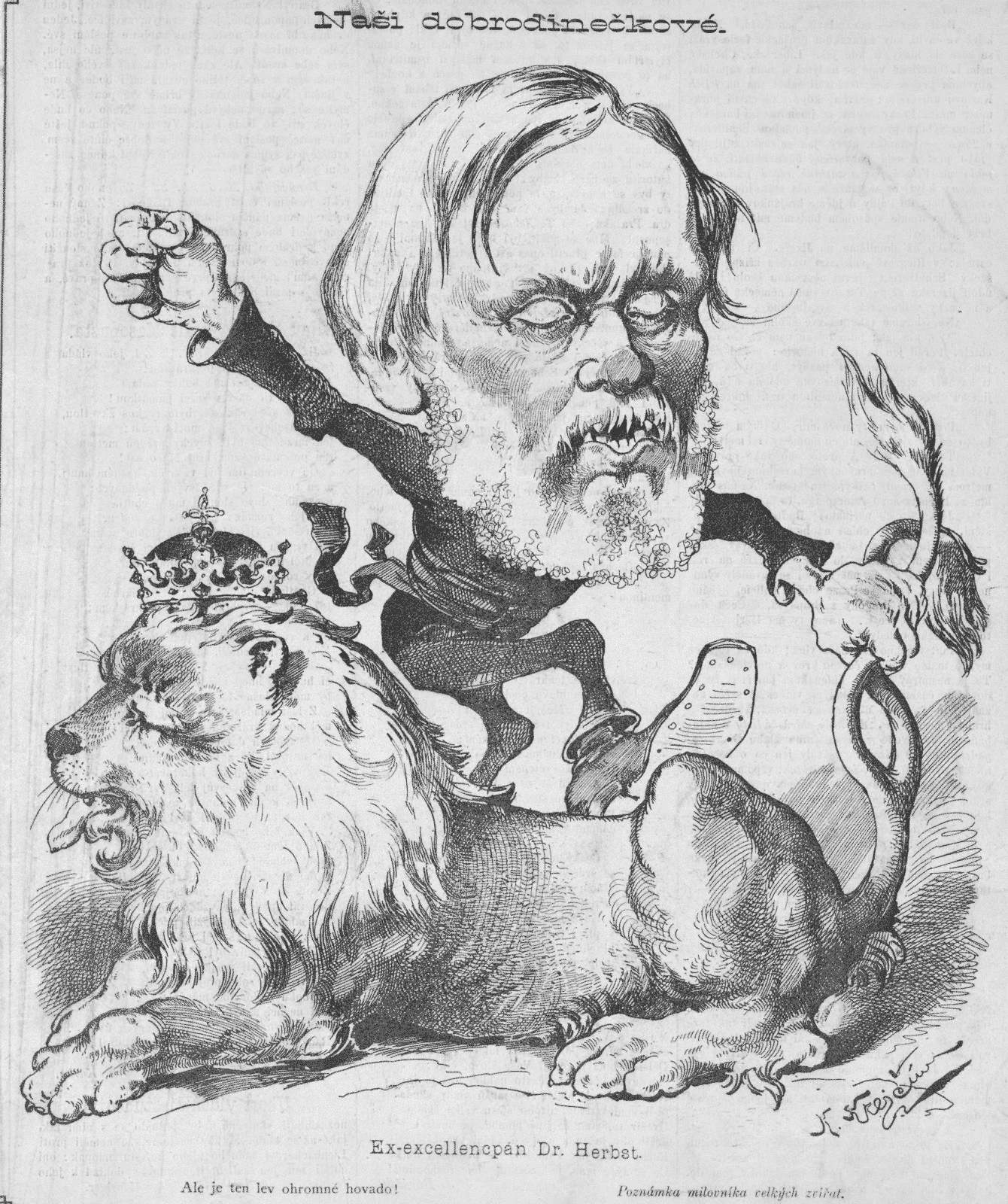
Czech cartoon of Eduard Herbst blindly crossing over the Bohemian Lion (1881)

As such, he introduced a number of important reforms—among them the abolition of imprisonment for debt, the introduction of the jury in libel suits against the press, the organization of the district courts, important finance measures, and, above all, the confessional ordinances of 1868. Herbst retained his office under Auersperg's successor Eduard Taaffe, with whom he fell out in 1870, when he sided with Education Minister Leopold Hasner von Artha against Taaffe's federalist policies; he and Hasner resigned on April 4.

His party lost its control of the government, and he led the German liberal opposition in the Reichsrat in its attacks on the cabinets of Alfred Jozef Potocki and Karl Sigmund von Hohenwart. The fall of the latter, in October 1871, brought the Constitutional Party more into power, when Herbst became a leader of the government forces in the Austrian Lower House. He remained an advocate of centralist German-Liberal politics and stood out as an opponent of the Austro-Hungarian rule in Bosnia and Herzegovina in 1878. In the latter years of his life, however, during the second cabinet of Minister-president Taaffe from 1879 onwards, Herbst lost much of his former influence because of a split in his former compact party.

Herbst also was a profound legal academic. Among his writings may be mentioned his Handbuch des österreichischen Strafrechts (7th edition, 1882–84).
