= Carl Giskra =

Statesman of the Austrian Empire

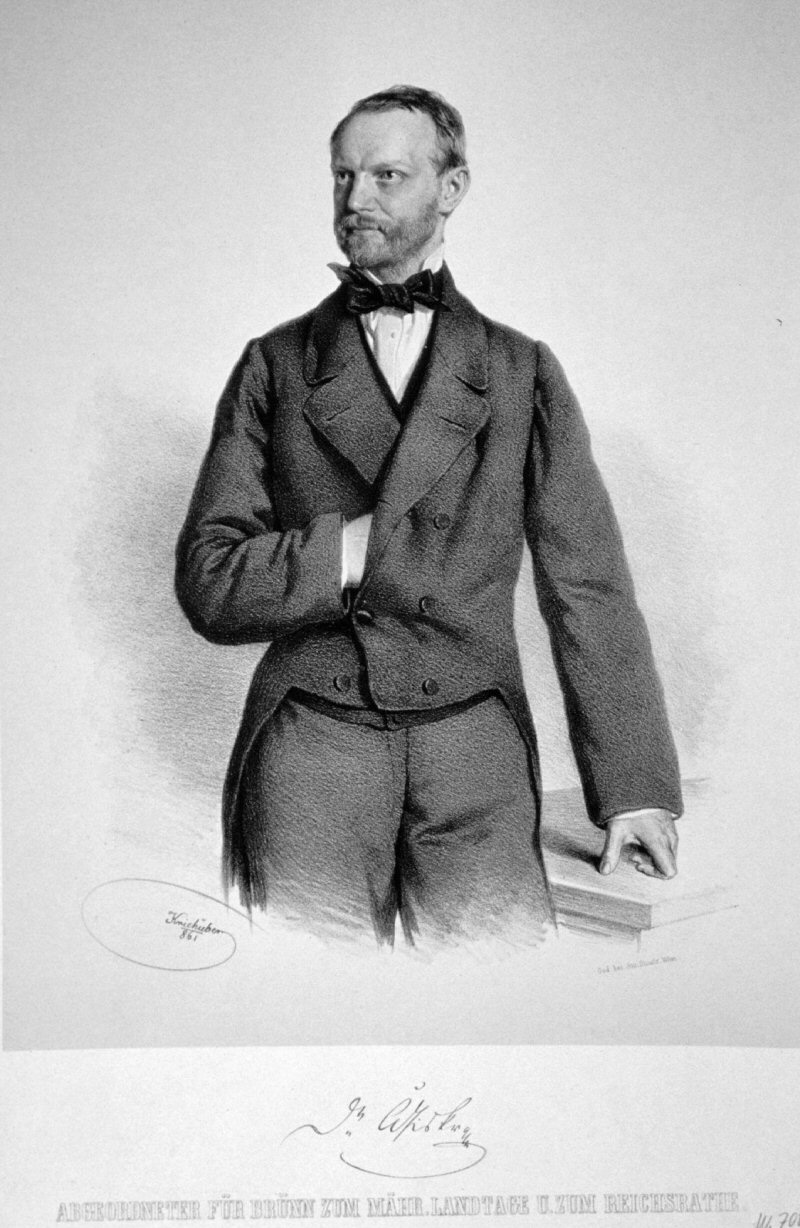
- Carl Giskra, lithograph by Joseph Kriehuber, 1861

Interior Minister of Cisleithania
- In office 1 January 1868 – 22 March 1870
- Monarch: Francis Joseph I
- Prime Minister: Prince Karl of Auersperg
- Preceded by: Eduard Taaffe, 11th Viscount Taaffe
- Succeeded by: Eduard Taaffe, 11th Viscount Taaffe

Personal details
- Born: 29 January 1820 Mährisch-Trübau, Margraviate of Moravia, Austrian Empire
- Died: 1 June 1879 (aged 59) Baden bei Wien, Austria-Hungary

Carl Giskra (29 January 1820, in Mährisch-Trübau – 1 June 1879, in Baden bei Wien) was a statesman of the Austrian Empire.

Preceded by Eduard Taaffe, 11th Viscount Taaffe	Interior Minister of the Austrian Empire; 1868–1870	Succeeded by Eduard Taaffe, 11th Viscount Taaffe
