= Eduard, Count of Taaffe =

Austrian statesman (1833–1895)

Hochgeboren Eduard Franz Joseph Graf von Taaffe, Viscount Taaffe
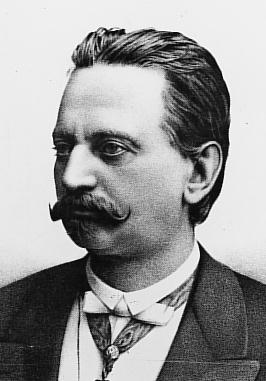
- Count Eduard Taaffe, Viscount Taaffe

Minister-President of Austria
- In office 12 August 1879 – 11 November 1893
- Monarch: Francis Joseph I
- Preceded by: Karl von Stremayr
- Succeeded by: Alfred zu Windisch-Grätz
- In office 24 September 1868 – 15 January 1870
- Monarch: Francis Joseph I
- Preceded by: Karl von Auersperg
- Succeeded by: Ignaz von Plener

Minister of the Interior of Austria
- In office 14 April 1870 – 6 February 1871
- Prime Minister: Alfred Józef Potocki
- Preceded by: Carl Giskra
- Succeeded by: Karl Sigmund von Hohenwart
- In office 7 March 1867 – 30 December 1867
- Prime Minister: Friedrich Ferdinand von Beust
- Preceded by: Friedrich Ferdinand von Beust
- Succeeded by: Carl Giskra

Personal details
- Born: 24 February 1833 Vienna, Austrian Empire
- Died: 29 November 1895 (aged 62) Ellischau (Nalžovy), Bohemia, Austria-Hungary

Eduard Franz Joseph Graf von Taaffe, 11th Viscount Taaffe (24 February 1833 – 29 November 1895) was an Austrian statesman, who served for two terms as Minister-President of Cisleithania, leading cabinets from 1868 to 1870 and 1879 to 1893. He was a scion of the Irish Taaffe noble dynasty, who held hereditary titles from two countries: Imperial Counts (Reichsgrafen) of the Holy Roman Empire and viscounts in the Peerage of Ireland (in the United Kingdom).

== Family background and early years ==
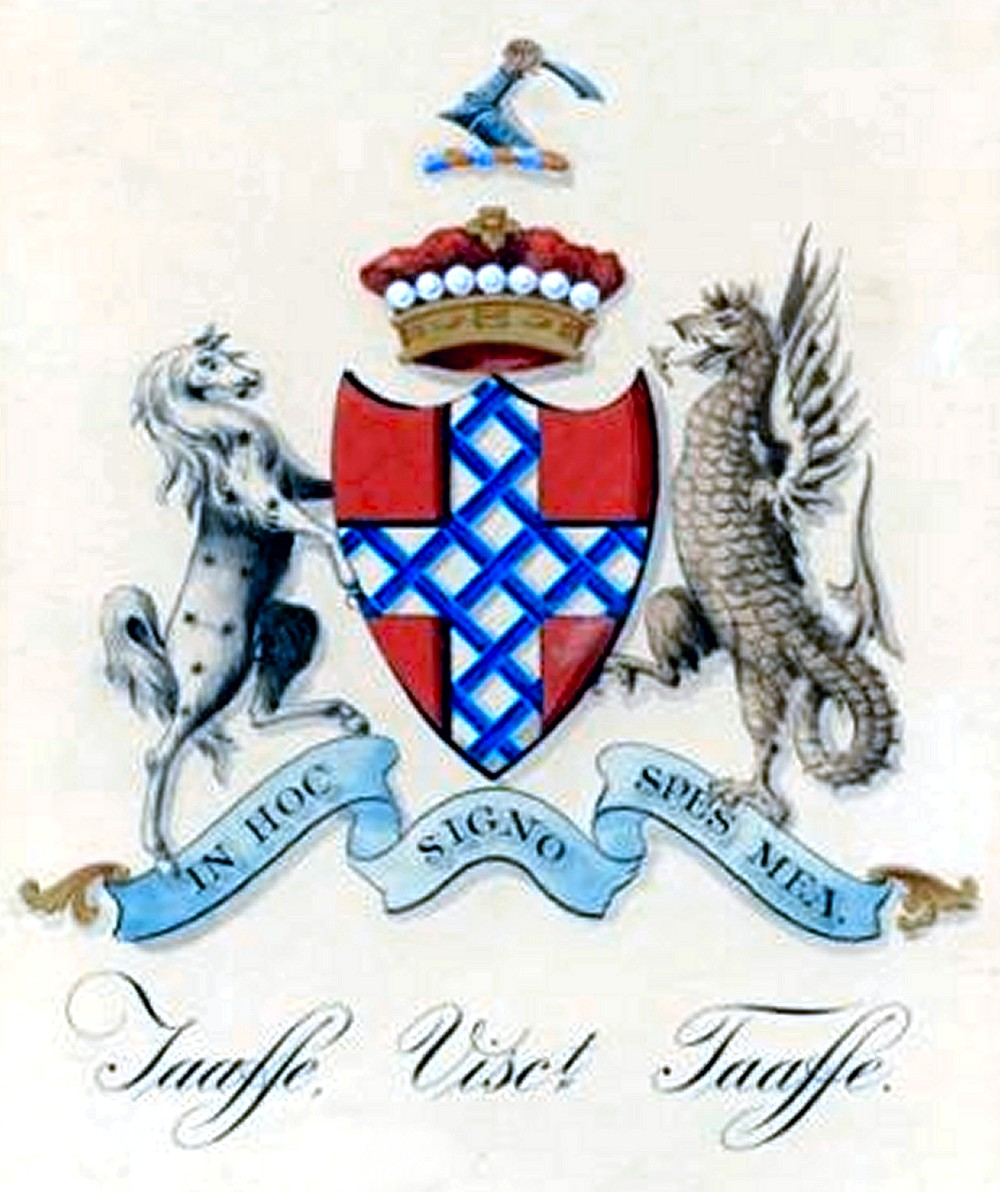
Taaffe Coat of Arms

Taaffe was the second son of Count Louis Taaffe, 9th Viscount Taaffe (1791–1855), Austrian Minister of Justice during the Revolutions of 1848 and president of the court of appeal, and his wife, Princess Amalie von Bretzenheim (1802–1874), granddaughter of Charles Theodore, Elector of Bavaria. His ancestor Francis Taaffe, 3rd Earl of Carlingford (1639–1704) had entered the service of the Habsburg monarchy in the 17th century; the family held large estates in Bohemia.

As a child, Eduard Taaffe was one of the chosen companions of the young Archduke Francis Joseph, who in 1848 was crowned Emperor of Austria. That connection led to a distinguished political career for Taaffe in the service of the Habsburgs. He studied law at the University of Vienna and entered public service in 1852. From 1861 he served at the Bohemian crown land government in Prague and in 1863 was appointed Landespräsident (stadtholder) in the Duchy of Salzburg. He backed the implementation of the February Patent constitution under State Minister Anton von Schmerling and in 1864 became a member of the Bohemian Diet (zemský sněm, Landtag), where he did however not excel. In 1867 the Chairmen of the Ministers' Conference Count Richard Belcredi appointed him Upper Austrian stadtholder at Linz.

By the death of his elder brother Charles (1823–1873), colonel in the Austro-Hungarian Army, Eduard Graf von Taaffe succeeded to the Irish titles. He had married Countess Irma Csáky in 1862, by whom he left four daughters and one son, Henry.

== Political life ==
=== Minister-President (first term) ===
During the Austro-Hungarian Compromise of 1867, Emperor Francis Joseph offered him the post of Minister of the Interior in Count Friedrich Ferdinand von Beust's cabinet. In June he became vice-president of the ministry, and at the end of the year, he entered the first ministry (Bürgerministerium) of the newly organized Austrian portion of the monarchy. For the next three years, he took a notable part in the confused political changes, and probably more than any other politician represented the wishes of the emperor.

Taaffe had entered the ministry as a German Liberal, but he soon took an intermediate position between the Liberal majority of the Bürgerministerium ("Citizen's Ministry" because it was mainly commoners) and the party which desired a federal constitution and which was strongly supported at court. From September 1868 to January 1870, after the retirement of Auersperg, he was president of the cabinet. In 1870, the government fell on the question of the revision of the constitution: Taaffe with Potocki and Johann Nepomuk Berger wished to make some concessions to the Federalists; the Liberal majority wished to preserve undiminished the authority of the Imperial Council. The two parties presented memoranda to the emperor, each defending their view and offering their resignation: after some hesitation, the emperor accepted the policy of the majority, and Taaffe and his friends resigned.

=== Second term ===
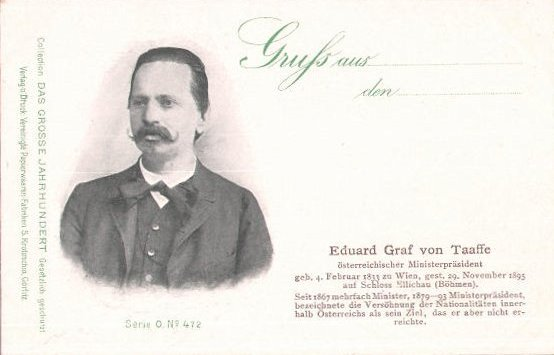
Count Eduard Taaffe

The Liberals, however, failed to form a new government, as the representatives of most of the territories refused to appear in the Imperial Council: they resigned, and in the month of April Potocki and Taaffe returned to office. The latter failed, however, in an attempt to come to an understanding with the Czechs, and in their turn, they had to make way for the Clerical and Federalist cabinet of Hohenwart. Taaffe now became governor of Tyrol, but in 1879, on the collapse of the Liberal government, he was recalled to high office. At first, he attempted to carry on the government without a change of principles, but he soon found it necessary to come to an understanding with the Feudal and Federal parties and was responsible for the conduct of the negotiations which, in the elections of the same year, gave a majority to the different groups of the National and Clerical opposition. In July he became minister president: at first, he still continued to govern with the Liberals, but this was soon made impossible, and he was obliged to turn for support to the Conservatives.

Legislation to help the working class emerged from Catholic conservatives. They turned to social reform by using Swiss and German models and intervening in state economic matters. In Germany, Chancellor Otto von Bismarck had used such policies to neutralize socialist promises. The Catholics studied the Swiss Factory Act of 1877 which limited working hours for everyone, and gave maternity benefits, and German laws that insured workers against industrial risks inherent in the workplace. These served as the basis for Austria's 1885 Trade Code Amendment.

=== Election reform of 1882 ===
Count Taaffe is mostly remembered for his election reform of 1882, which reduced to 5 guilders the minimum tax base required for men over the age of 24 to vote. Before this reform, the tax base was set locally, but was usually at a considerably higher level, so that only 6% of the male population of Cisleithania had been entitled to vote. However, even after this reform, there were still four classes of voters whose vote counted differently, depending on how much tax an individual was paying.

The next election reform was enacted in 1896 by Kasimir Felix Graf Badeni, who succeeded in bringing about more radical reforms than Taaffe had achieved by creating a fifth class which "included all males who had attained the age of twenty four years".

=== Social policies ===
Various reforms concerning a number of social issues were undertaken during Taaffe’s time in office. Compulsory sickness and accident insurance was introduced, the employment of children under the age of 11 was forbidden, and the maximum working day was set as 11 hours. A system of farmers’ cooperative banks was also organized. There were limits to reforms undertake by the government, however. The 11-hour maximum working day, for instance, could (as noted by one study) “be increased by one hour by order of the ministry of trade,” while exemptions to the working day regulations had been officially authorized.

=== Policies on nationalities ===
It was Taaffe's great achievement that he persuaded the Czechs to abandon the policy of abstention and to take part in the parliament. It was on the support of them, the Poles, and the Clericals that his majority depended. His avowed intention was to unite the nationalities of Austria: Germans and Slavs were, as he said, equally integral parts of Austria; neither must be oppressed; both must unite to form an Austrian parliament. Notwithstanding the growing opposition of the German Liberals, who refused to accept the equality of the nationalities, he kept his position for thirteen years.

== Late years ==
In 1893 he was defeated on a proposal for the revision of the franchise and resigned. He retired into private life, and died two years later at his country residence, Ellischau, in Bohemia.

== Honours ==
- Austria-Hungary:
  - Grand Cross of the Imperial Order of Leopold, 1867; Chancellor
  - Knight of the Golden Fleece, 1878
  - Grand Cross of the Royal Hungarian Order of St. Stephen, 1887
- Sovereign Military Order of Malta: Bailiff Grand Cross of Honour of Devotion
- Russian Empire: Knight of St. Alexander Nevsky
- Kingdom of Prussia:
  - Knight of the Royal Crown Order, 2nd Class with Star, 3 August 1863
  - Knight of the Black Eagle, 13 October 1892
  - Grand Cross of the Red Eagle
- Kingdom of Italy: Grand Cross of Saints Maurice and Lazarus
- Belgium: Grand Cordon of the Order of Leopold
- Kingdom of Romania: Grand Cross of the Star of Romania
- Persian Empire: Order of the August Portrait, in Diamonds
- Empire of Japan: Grand Cordon of the Rising Sun
- Kingdom of Serbia: Grand Cross of the Cross of Takovo
- Grand Duchy of Hesse: Grand Cross of the Merit Order of Philip the Magnanimous, 5 September 1863

Political offices
Preceded by Count Beust	Interior Minister of the Austrian Empire; 1867	Succeeded by Carl Giskra
Preceded by Karl von Auersperg	Minister-President of Cisleithania; 1868–1870	Succeeded by Ignaz von Plener
Preceded by Carl Giskra	Interior Minister of Cisleithania; 1870–1871	Succeeded by Count von Hohenwart
Preceded by Karl von Stremayr	Minister-President of Cisleithania; 1879–1893	Succeeded by Alfred III. zu Windisch-Grätz
Peerage of Ireland
Preceded by Charles Taaffe	Viscount Taaffe; 1873–1895	Succeeded by Count Henry von Taaffe
