= Leopold Hasner von Artha =

Austrian civil servant and statesman (1818–1891)

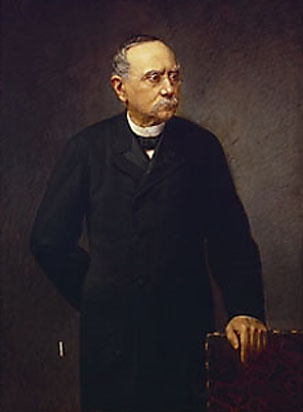
- Leopold Hasner von Artha

Minister-President of Austria
- In office 1 February 1870 – 12 April 1870
- Monarch: Francis Joseph I
- Preceded by: Ignaz von Plener
- Succeeded by: Count Alfred Józef Potocki

Personal details
- Born: 15 March 1818 Prague, Kingdom of Bohemia, Austrian Empire
- Died: 5 June 1891 (aged 73) Bad Ischl, Austria-Hungary

Leopold Hasner von Artha (15 March 1818, Prague – 5 June 1891, Bad Ischl) was an Austrian civil servant and statesman. He served as the 4th Minister-President of Cisleithania.

Hasner was born on 15 March 1818 in Prague. Educated at Prague and Vienna in philosophy and law, he went to work for the Office of the Court Attorney in Vienna in 1842. In 1848 Leopold became the editor of the liberal-democratic newspaper, the Prager Tagblatt. He favored a centralized administration of the Austro-Hungarian Empire and gained the attention of Leopold, Count von Thun und Hohenstein, who secured Hasner a position as a professor of legal philosophy at the University of Prague in 1849. Leopold was elected to the Bohemian Diet in 1861, and in 1863 served as the president of the Lower House in the Imperial Council (Austria). Starting in 1865 he served as a professor of Economics at the University of Vienna. Hasner was a member of the House of Lords starting in 1867 and serves as the Minister of Education in the cabinet of Prince Karl of Auersperg from 1868 to 1870.

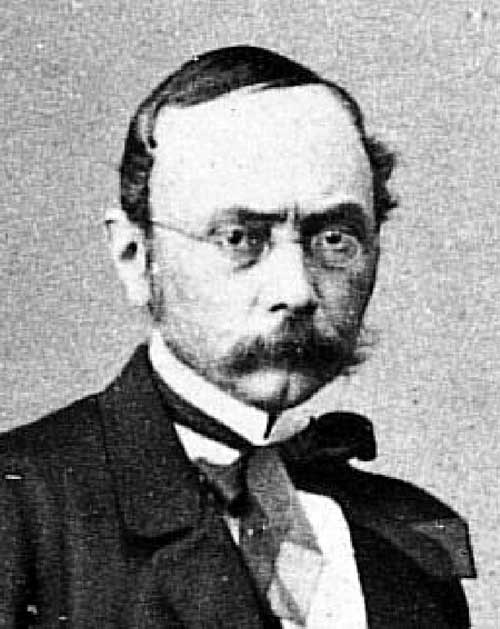
Leopold Hasner von Artha

One of his greatest accomplishments as Minister of Education was to enact the 1869 Imperial Elementary School Act. The Act included compulsory education for eight years, state control of primary education, and made primary schools nondenominational. Hasner also oversaw the creation of the Reichsvolksschulgesetz, an inter-denominational secondary school, and the opening of a medical school at the University of Innsbruck. Leopold briefly served as Prime Minister in 1870. In recognition of Hasner's contributions to education the Cieszyn town council conferred upon him the title of honorary citizen on 3 May 1889. Leopold Hasner von Artha died on 5 June 1891 in Bad Ischl, Austria. Shortly after his death a monument was erected in his honor in Bad Ischl. In addition, a street in Linz (Hasnerstraße) is named after him.

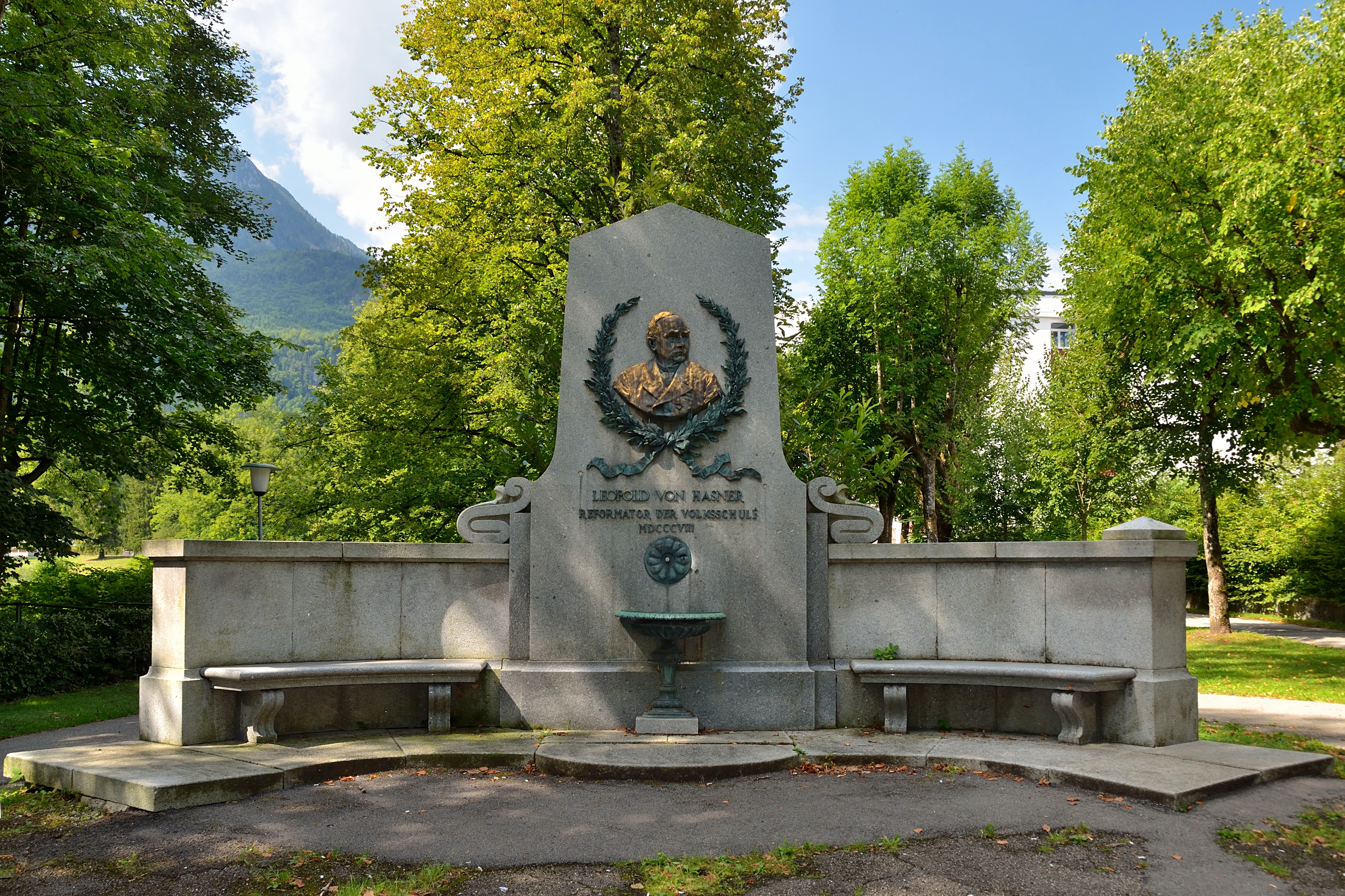
Leopold Hasner monument 01, Bad Ischl

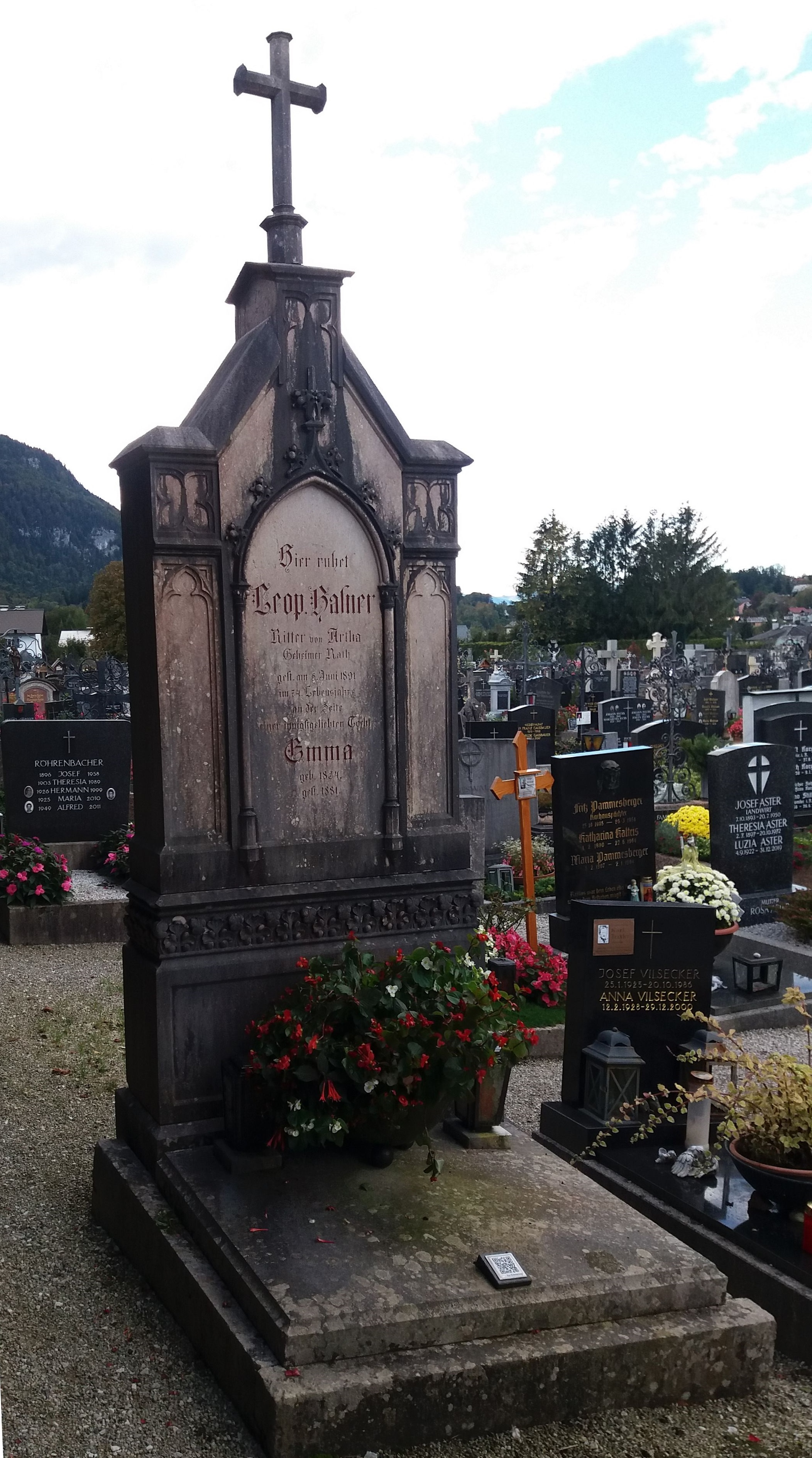
Grab von Leopold Hasner von Artha - Friedhof Bad Ischl
