= Constitutional Party (Austria) =

Constitutional Party Verfassungspartei
- Leader: Eduard Herbst
- Founded: 1861
- Dissolved: 1881
- Merged into: United Left
- Headquarters: Vienna
- Ideology: Liberalism (Austrian); Free trade National liberalism

The Constitutional Party (German: Verfassungspartei), also known as the German-Liberal Party (German: Deutschliberale Partei) was the main representative of liberalism and national liberalism in the German-speaking parts of the Austro-Hungarian Empire during the 1860s and 70s.

It was a party of the German-speaking bourgeoisie, had anti-clerical positions and sought to defend the privileges of German-speakers vis-à-vis the rising national movements of the Slavic minorities in the Habsburg monarchy. It supported the Austro-Hungarian Compromise of 1867, transforming the Austrian Empire into the Austro-Hungarian Dual monarchy and the 1867 December Constitution, which is why it received its name. Afterwards it became the strongest political group in the Imperial Council (the parliament of the Cis-Leithanian, i.e. Austrian-dominated, part of the empire) until 1879.

It was weakened after the financial crisis of 1873, which added to the rise of the more radical German nationalist movement. The Constitutional Party merged with the Progressive Club to form the "United Left" in 1881, which fell apart again in 1885 splitting into the German-Austrian Club and the German Club. Former members of the Constitutional Party were later referred to as "Old Liberals" (Altliberale).

== See also ==
- Liberalism in Austria
- National Constitution Party

== Notes and references ==
- Kwan, Jonathan (2013). Liberalism and the Habsburg Monarchy, 1861-1895. Palgrave Macmillan.
