= Baron Ignaz von Plener =

Austrian politician

Hochwohlgeboren Ignaz Freiherr von Plener
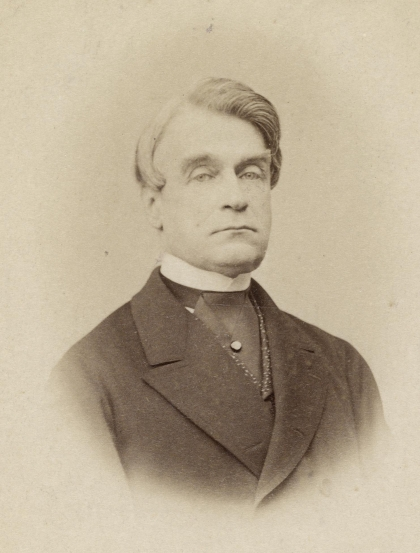
- Baron Ignaz von Plener

Minister-President of Austria
- In office 15 January 1870 – 1 February 1870
- Monarch: Francis Joseph I
- Preceded by: Eduard von Taaffe
- Succeeded by: Leopold Hasner von Artha

Personal details
- Born: 21 May 1810 Vienna, Austrian Empire
- Died: 17 February 1908 (aged 97) Vienna, Austria-Hungary

Baron Ignaz von Plener (21 May 1810 – 17 February 1908) was an Austrian statesman. He served as Minister-President of Austria.

== Biography ==
Baron (Freiherr) Ignaz von Plener was born in Vienna in 1810 in a family of lower nobility. He studied law at the University of Vienna before entering the governmental service.

In 1859 he was made Privy Councilor, a year afterward received the portfolio of Finance and revived the Bank Acts and the Ministry of Commerce before his resignation in 1865, and in 1867 entered the Liberal Centralist cabinet of Giska as Minister of Commerce. This post he held until 1870.

He became the third Minister-President of Cisleithania from 15 January 1870 to 1 February 1870.

He was a member of the Lower House until 1873, when he was appointed to the House of Lords. In 1882 Plener was an ardent opponent of a personal income tax. He was the father of Ernst von Plener.

== See also ==
- List of minister-presidents of Austria
