= Government of Austria-Hungary =

Political system from 1867 to 1918

The government of Austria-Hungary was the political system of Austria-Hungary between the formation of the dual monarchy in the Compromise of 1867 and the dissolution of the empire in 1918. The Compromise turned the Habsburg domains into a real union between the Austrian Empire ("Lands Represented in the Imperial Council", or Cisleithania) in the western and northern half and the Kingdom of Hungary ("Lands of the Crown of Saint Stephen", or Transleithania). in the eastern half. The two halves shared a common monarch, who ruled as Emperor of Austria over the western and northern half portion and as King of Hungary over the eastern portion. Foreign relations and defense were managed jointly, and the two countries also formed a customs union. All other state functions were to be handled separately by each of the two states.

Certain regions, such as Polish Galicia within Cisleithania and Croatia within Transleithania, enjoyed autonomous status, each with its own unique governmental structures (see: Polish Autonomy in Galicia and Croatian–Hungarian Settlement).

== Overview ==
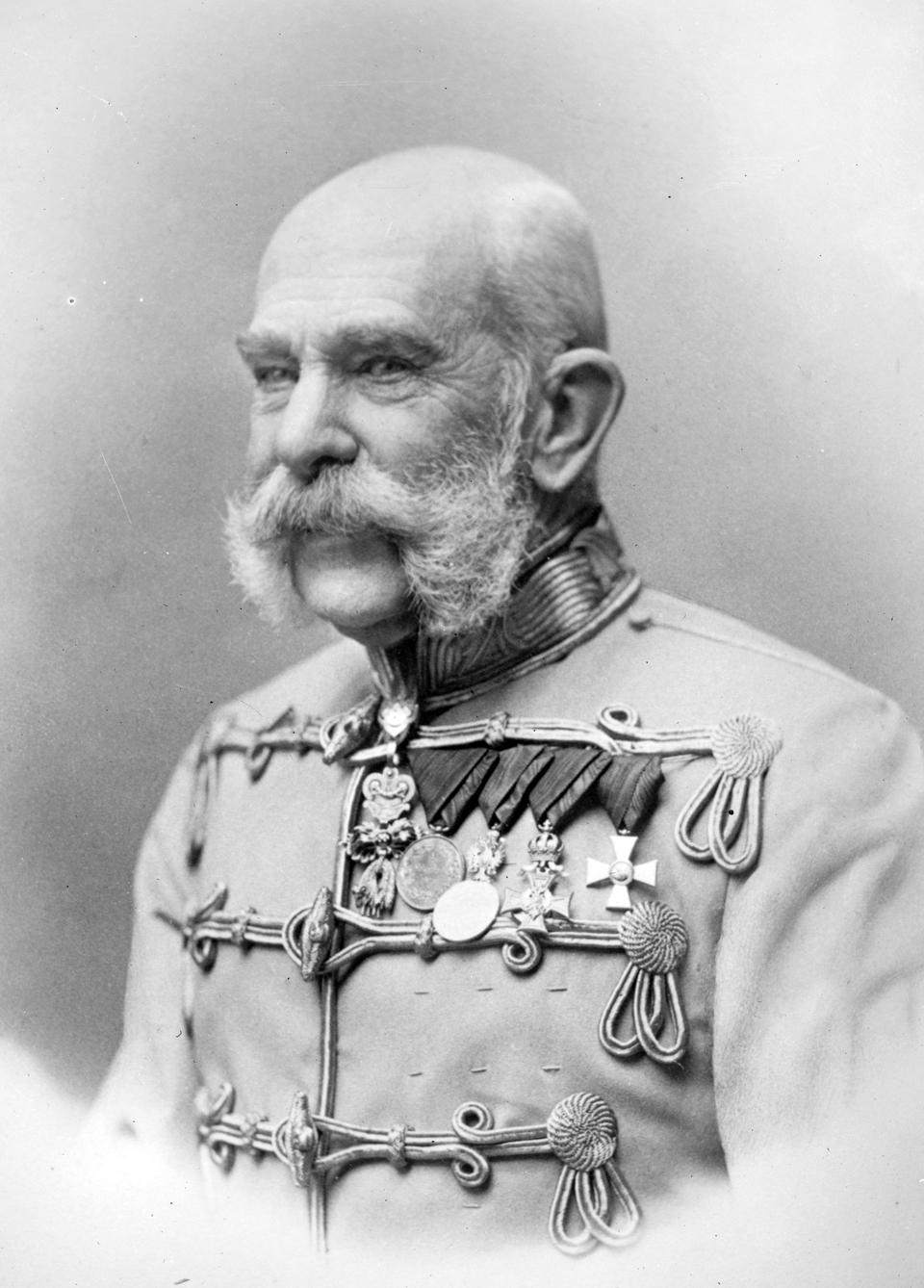
Emperor Franz Joseph I in 1905

The division between Austria and Hungary was so marked that there was no common citizenship: one was either an Austrian citizen or a Hungarian citizen, never both. This also meant that there were always separate Austrian and Hungarian passports, never a common one. However, neither Austrian nor Hungarian passports were used in the Kingdom of Croatia-Slavonia. Instead, the Kingdom issued its own passports, which were written in Croatian and French, and displayed the coat of arms of the Kingdom of Croatia-Slavonia-Dalmatia on them. Croatia-Slavonia also had executive autonomy regarding naturalization and citizenship, defined as "Hungarian-Croatian citizenship" for the kingdom's citizens. It is not known what kind of passports were used in Bosnia-Herzegovina, which was under the control of both Austria and Hungary.

The Kingdom of Hungary had always maintained a separate parliament, the Diet of Hungary, even after the Austrian Empire was created in 1804. The administration and government of the Kingdom of Hungary (until 1848–49 Hungarian revolution) remained largely untouched by the government structure of the overarching Austrian Empire. Hungary's central government structures remained well separated from the Austrian imperial government. The country was governed by the Council of Lieutenancy of Hungary (the Gubernium) – located in Pressburg and later in Pest – and by the Hungarian Royal Court Chancellery in Vienna. The Hungarian government and Hungarian parliament were suspended after the Hungarian revolution of 1848 and were reinstated after the Austro-Hungarian Compromise in 1867.

Vienna served as the Monarchy's primary capital. The Cisleithanian (Austrian) part contained about 57 percent of the total population and the larger share of its economic resources, compared to the Hungarian part.

There were three parts to the rule of the Austro-Hungarian Empire:

1. the common foreign, military, and a joint financial policy (only for diplomatic, military, and naval expenditures; later also included the Bosnian affairs) under the monarch
2. the "Austrian" or Cisleithanian government (Lands Represented in the Imperial Council)
3. the "Hungarian" or Transleithanian government (Lands of the Crown of Saint Stephen)

Austria-Hungary
Lands Represented in the Imperial Council	Lands of the Crown of Saint Stephen
Kingdom of Hungary	Kingdom of Croatia-Slavonia

← common emperor-king,
common ministries

← entities

← partner states

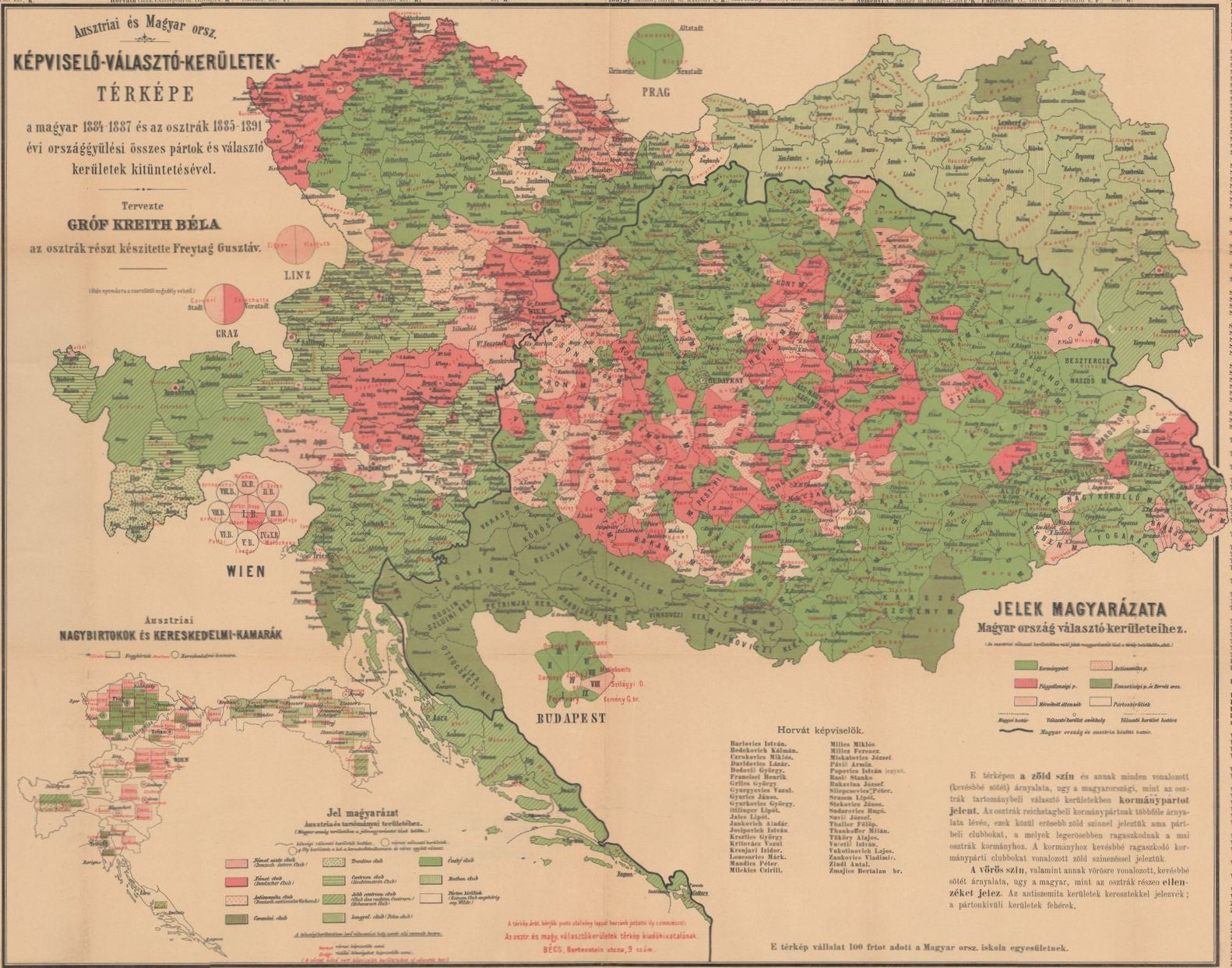
Electoral districts of Austria and Hungary in the 1880s. On the map opposition districts are marked in different shades of red, ruling party districts are in different shades of green, independent districts are in white.

The first prime minister of Hungary after the Compromise was Count Gyula Andrássy (1867–1871). The old Hungarian Constitution was restored, and Franz Joseph was crowned as King of Hungary. Andrássy next served as the Foreign Minister of Austria–Hungary (1871–1879).

The Empire relied increasingly on a cosmopolitan bureaucracy—in which Czechs played an important role—backed by loyal elements, including a large part of the German, Hungarian, Polish and Croat aristocracy.

After 1878, Bosnia and Herzegovina came under Austro-Hungarian military and civilian rule until it was fully annexed in 1908, provoking the Bosnian crisis among the other powers. The northern part of the Ottoman Sanjak of Novi Pazar was also under de facto joint occupation during that period, but the Austro-Hungarian army withdrew as part of their annexation of Bosnia. The annexation of Bosnia also led to Islam being recognized as an official state religion due to Bosnia's Muslim population.

== Joint government ==
The common government (officially designated Ministerial Council for Common Affairs, or Ministerrat für gemeinsame Angelegenheiten in German) came into existence in 1867 as a result of the Austro-Hungarian Compromise. The Government of Austria, which ruled the monarchy until then became the government of the Austrian part and another government was formed for the Hungarian part. A common government was also formed for the few matters of common national security - the Common Army, navy, foreign policy and the imperial household, and the customs union. It consisted of three Imperial and Royal Joint-ministries (k.u.k. gemeinsame Ministerien):

- Ministry of the Imperial and Royal Household and Foreign Affairs, known as the Imperial Chancellery before 1869;
- Imperial and Royal Ministry of War, known as the Imperial Ministry of War before 1911;
- Imperial and Royal Ministry of Finance, known as the Imperial Ministry of Finance before 1908, responsible only for the finances of the other two joint-ministries.

The Minister of the Imperial and Royal Household and Foreign Affairs was the chairman (except when the Monarch was present and led the meetings himself) and thus he was de facto the common prime minister. Since 1869 the prime ministers of the Austrian and Hungarian halves of the monarchy were also members of the common government. The Chief of the General Staff usually attended the meetings (with no voting rights) as he had the intelligence service (the Evidenzbureau) under his subordination. When required ministers and high-ranking officials from the Austrian and the Hungarian governments could also attend the meetings, but also without voting rights. In addition to the council, the Austrian and Hungarian parliaments each elected a delegation of 60 members, who met separately and voted on the expenditures of the Ministerial Council, giving the two governments influence in the common administration. However, the ministers ultimately answered only to the monarch, who had the final decision on matters of foreign and military policy.

Overlapping responsibilities between the joint ministries and the ministries of the two halves caused friction and inefficiencies. The armed forces suffered particularly from the overlap. Although the unified government determined the overall military direction, the Austrian and Hungarian governments each remained in charge of recruiting, supplies and training. Each government could have a strong influence over common governmental responsibilities. Each half of the Dual Monarchy proved quite prepared to disrupt common operations to advance its own interests.

Relations during the half-century after 1867 between the two parts of the dual monarchy featured repeated disputes over shared external tariff arrangements and over the financial contribution of each government to the common treasury. These matters were determined by the Austro-Hungarian Compromise of 1867, in which common expenditures were allocated 70% to Austria and 30% to Hungary. This division had to be renegotiated every ten years. There was political turmoil during the build-up to each renewal of the agreement. By 1907, the Hungarian share had risen to 36.4%. The disputes culminated in the early 1900s in a prolonged constitutional crisis. It was triggered by disagreement over which language to use for command in Hungarian army units and deepened by the advent to power in Budapest in April 1906 of a Hungarian nationalist coalition. Provisional renewals of the common arrangements occurred in October 1907 and in November 1917 on the basis of the status quo. The negotiations in 1917 ended with the dissolution of the Dual Monarchy.

In 1878, the Congress of Berlin placed the Bosnia Vilayet of the Ottoman Empire under Austro-Hungarian occupation. The region was formally annexed in 1908 and was governed by Austria and Hungary jointly (a Condominium). The governor-general of Bosnia and Herzegovina was always an army officer, but he was first and foremost the head of the civil administration in the province (the Bosnian Office, German: Bosnische Amt) and was subordinated to the common Ministry of Finance (as the common government lacked a ministry of the interior). Bosnia received a Territorial Statute (Landesstatut) with the setting up of a Territorial Diet, regulations for the election and procedure of the Diet, a law of associations, a law of public meetings, and a law dealing with the district councils. According to this statute Bosnia-Herzegovina formed a single administrative territory under the responsible direction and supervision of the Ministry of Finance of the Dual Monarchy in Vienna.

== Parliaments ==
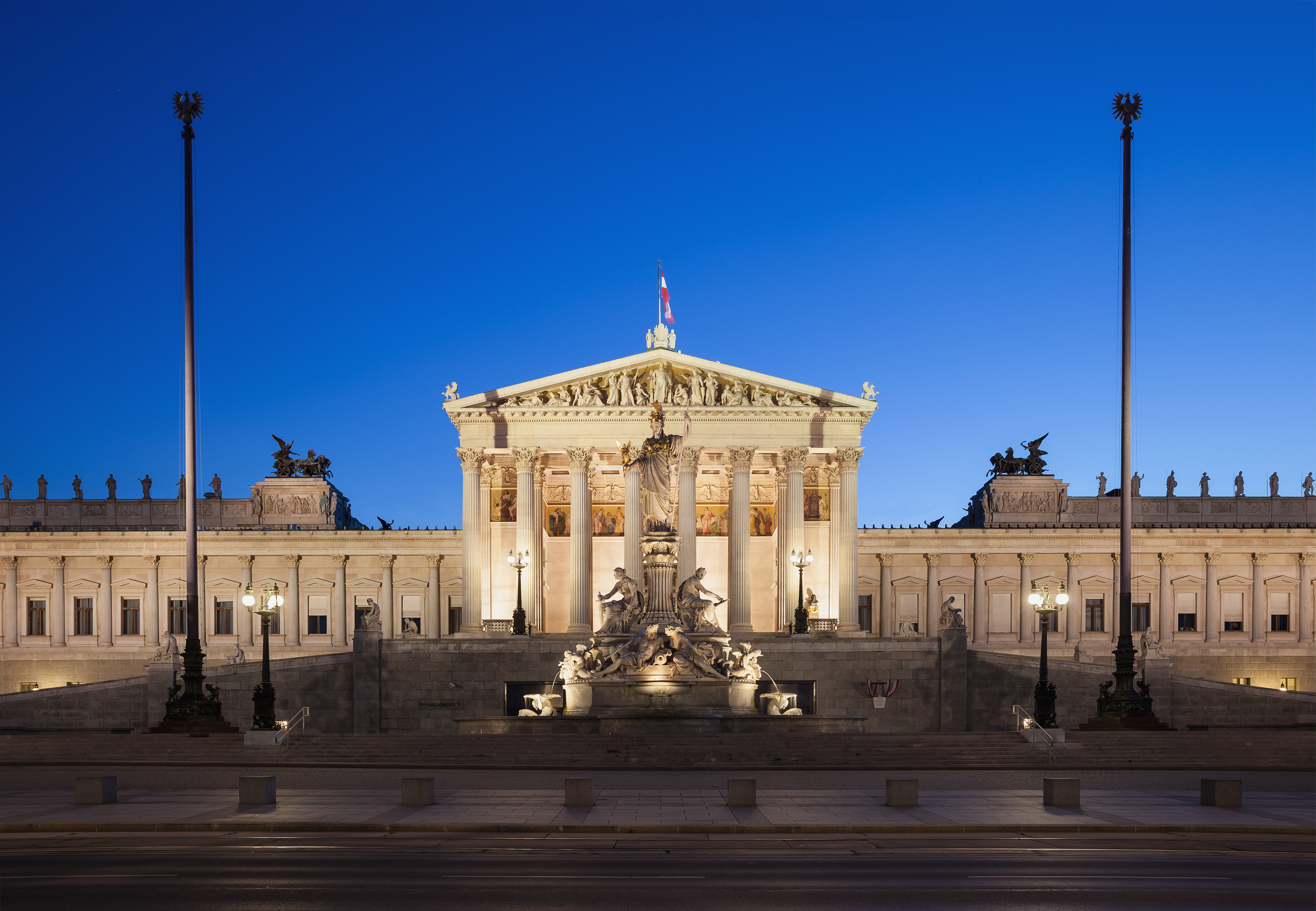
Austrian Parliament building

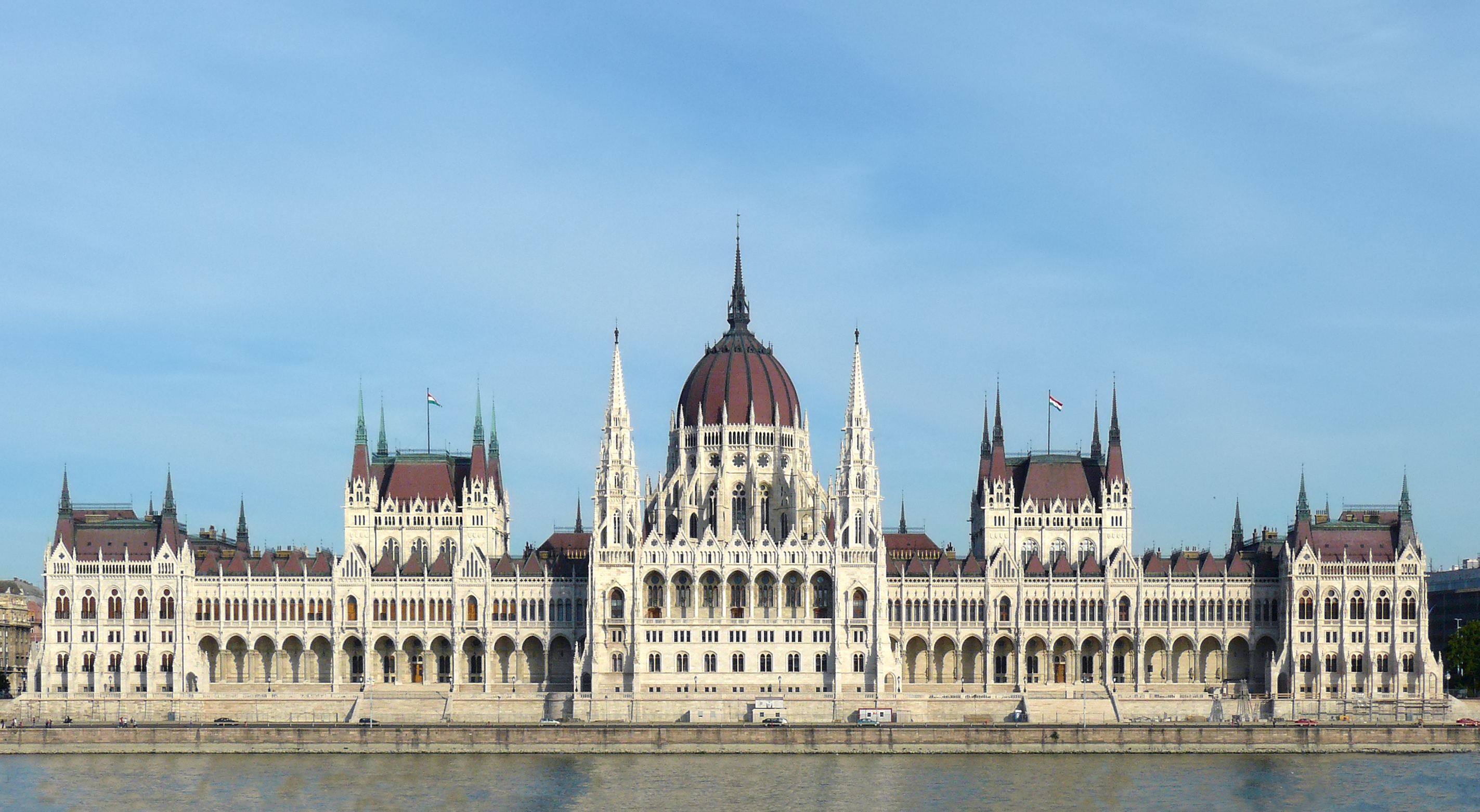
Hungarian Parliament building

Hungary and Austria maintained separate parliaments, each with its own prime minister: the Diet of Hungary (commonly known as the National Assembly) and the Imperial Council (German: Reichsrat) in Cisleithania. Each parliament had its own executive government, appointed by the monarch. In this sense, Austria–Hungary remained under an autocratic government, as the Emperor-King appointed both Austrian and Hungarian prime ministers along with their respective cabinets. This made both governments responsible to the Emperor-King, as neither half could have a government with a program contrary to the views of the Monarch. The Emperor-King could appoint non-parliamentary governments, for example, or keep a government that did not have a parliamentary majority in power in order to block the formation of another government which he did not approve of.

=== Cisleithania ===
The Imperial Council was a bicameral body: the upper house was the House of Lords (German: Herrenhaus), and the lower house was the House of Deputies (German: Abgeordnetenhaus). Members of the House of Deputies were elected through a system of "curiae" which weighted representation in favor of the wealthy but was progressively reformed until universal male suffrage was introduced in 1906. To become law, bills had to be passed by both houses, signed by the government minister responsible and then granted royal assent by the Emperor.

=== Transleithania ===
The Diet of Hungary was also bicameral: the upper house was the House of Magnates (Hungarian: Főrendiház), and the lower house was the House of Representatives (Hungarian: Képviselőház). The "curia" system was also used to elect members of the House of Representatives. Franchise was very limited, with around 5% of men eligible to vote in 1874, rising to 8% at the beginning of World War I. The Hungarian parliament had the power to legislate on all matters concerning Hungary, but for Croatia-Slavonia only on matters which it shared with Hungary. Matters concerning Croatia-Slavonia alone fell to the Croatian-Slavonian Diet (commonly referred to as the Croatian Parliament). The Monarch had the right to veto any kind of Bill before it was presented to the National Assembly, the right to veto all legislation passed by the National Assembly, and the power to prorogue or dissolve the Assembly and call for new elections. In practice, these powers were rarely used.

=== Bosnia and Herzegovina condominium ===
The Diet (Sabor) of Bosnia-Herzegovina was created in 1910. Its setup consisted of a single Chamber, elected on the principle of the representation of interests. It numbered 92 members. Of these 20 consisted of representatives of all the religious confessions, the president of the Supreme Court, the president of the Chamber of Advocates, the president of the Chamber of Commerce, and the mayor of Sarajevo. In addition to these were 72 deputies, elected by three curiae or electoral groups. The first curia included the large landowners, the highest taxpayers, and people who had reached a certain standard of education without regard to the amount they paid in taxes. To the second curia belonged inhabitants of the towns not qualified to vote in the first; to the third, country dwellers disqualified in the same way. With this curial system was combined the grouping of the mandates and of the electors according to the three dominant creeds (Catholic, Serbian Orthodox, Muslim). To the adherents of other creeds the right was conceded of voting with one or other of the religious electoral bodies within the curia to which they belonged.

The Diet had very limited legislative powers. The main legislative power was in the hands of the emperor, the parliaments in Vienna and Budapest, and the joint-minister of finance. The Diet of Bosnia could make proposals, but they had to be approved by both parliaments in Vienna and Budapest. The Diet could only deliberate on matters that affected Bosnia and Herzegovina exclusively; decisions on armed forces, commercial and traffic connections, customs, and similar matters, were made by the parliaments in Vienna and Budapest. The Diet also had no control over the National Council or the municipal councils.

== Government of Cisleithania ==
The Emperor of the dual monarchy in his right of Emperor of Austria and King of Bohemia, ruler of the Austrian part of the realm, officially named The Kingdoms and Lands Represented in the Parliament of the Realm (Die im Reichsrate vertretenen Königreiche und Länder), simplified in 1915 to just Austrian Lands (Österreichische Länder) appointed the Government of Austria. The Austrian ministries carried the designation Imperial-Royal Ministry (sing. k.k. Ministerium), in which Imperial stands for the Kaiser's title of Emperor and Austria and Royal stands for his title of King of Bohemia. The central authorities were known as the "Ministry" (Ministerium). In 1867 the Ministerium consisted of seven ministries (Agriculture, Religion and Education, Finance, Interior, Justice, Commerce and Public Works, Defence). A Ministry of Railways was created in 1896, and the Ministry of Public Works was separated from Commerce in 1908. Ministries of Public Health and Social Welfare were established in 1917 to deal with issues arising from World War I. The ministries all had the title k.k. ("Imperial-Royal"), referring to the Imperial Crown of Austria and the Royal Crown of Bohemia.

The Government included:

- the Imperial-Royal Prime Minister (k.k. Ministerpräsident);
- the Imperial-Royal Ministry of Agriculture (k.k. Ministerium für Ackerbau);
- the Imperial-Royal Ministry of Worship and Education (k.k. Ministerium für Cultus und Unterricht);
- the Imperial-Royal Ministry of the Railways (k.k. Ministerium für Eisenbahn), formed in 1896;
- the Imperial-Royal Ministry of Finance (k.k. Ministerium für Finanzen);
- the Imperial-Royal Ministry of Commerce (k.k. Ministerium für Handel);
- the Imperial-Royal Ministry of Interior Affairs (k.k. Ministerium des Inneres);
- the Imperial-Royal Ministry of Justice (k.k. Ministerium der Justiz);
- the Imperial-Royal Ministry of Territorial Defence (k.k. Ministerium für Landesverteidigung);
- the Imperial-Royal Ministry of Public Works [Expenditure] (k.k. Ministerium für öffentliche Arbeiten), formed in 1908;
- the Imperial-Royal Ministry of Social Care (k.k. Ministerium für Soziale Fürsorge), formed in 1917; and
- the Imperial-Royal Ministry of People's Healthcare (k.k. Ministerium für Volksgesundheit), also formed in 1917.

=== Local administration and governments of Cisleithania ===
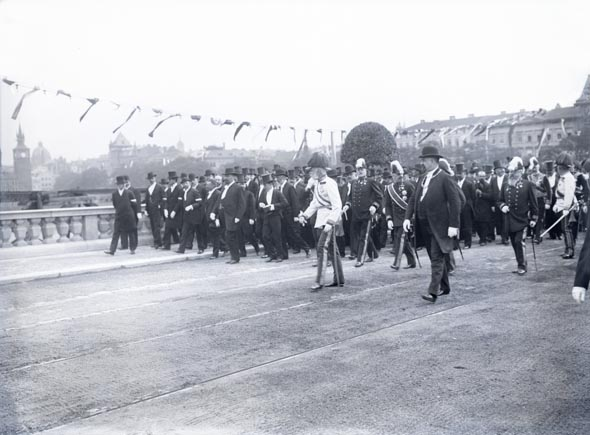
Emperor Franz Joseph I visiting Prague and opening the new Emperor Francis I Bridge in 1901

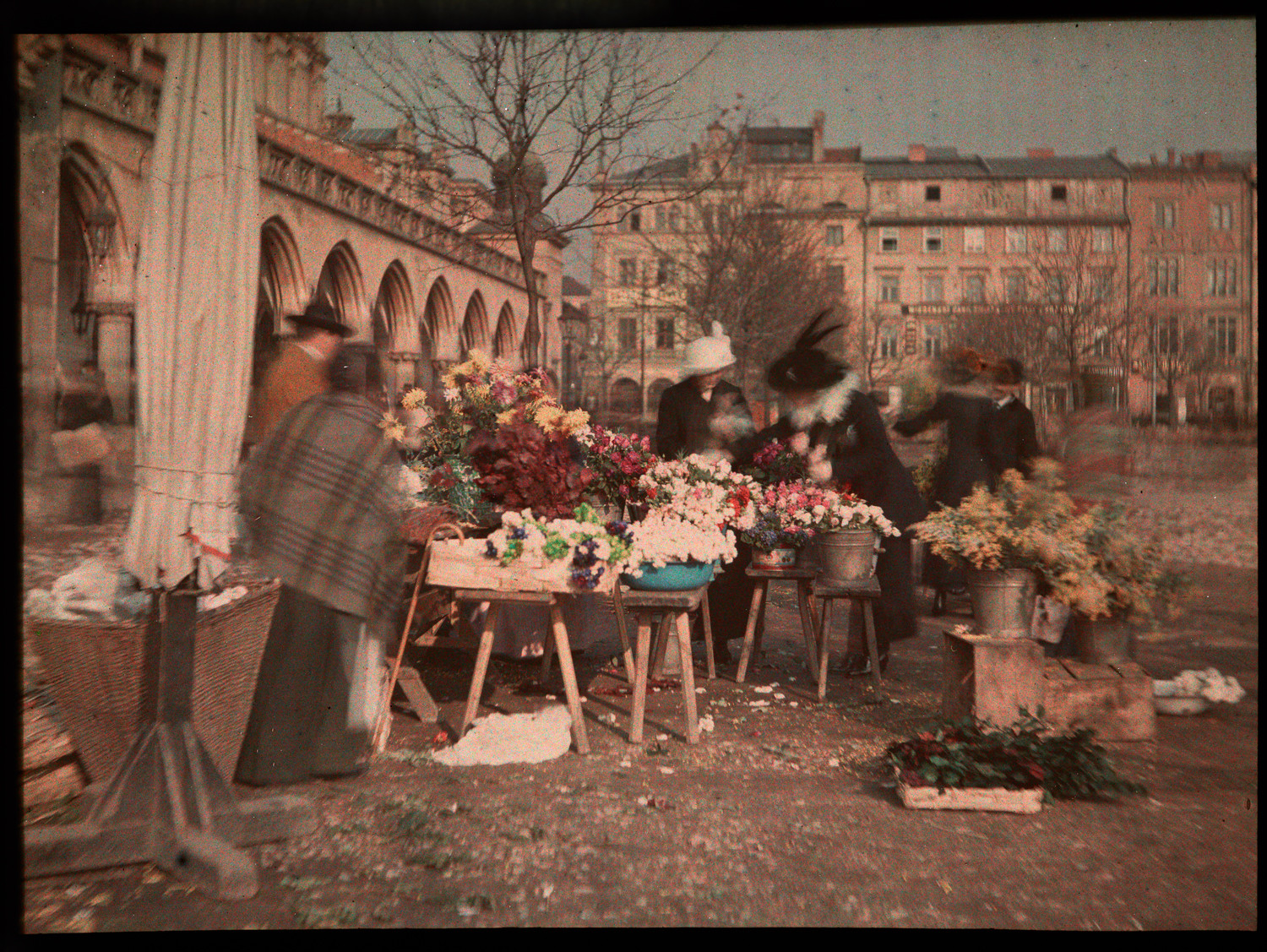
Kraków, a historical Polish city in the Austro-Hungarian Empire where in 1870 authorities allowed the use of the Polish language in the Jagiellonian University

The administrative system in the Austrian Empire consisted of three levels: the central State administration, the territories (Länder), and the local communal administration. The State administration comprised all affairs having relation to rights, duties, and interests "which are common to all territories"; all other administrative tasks were left to the territories. Finally, the communes had self-government within their own sphere.

==== Regional autonomy ====
Each of the seventeen territories of Cisleithania had an official from the central government, informally called a territorial chief (Landeschef). He was appointed by the Emperor at the advice of the Austrian Prime Minister and had his own small administrative office. The chief played a dual role in his assigned territory - a viceroy on behalf of the Emperor and governor on behalf of the Austrian central government. He was thus under the dual supervision of the monarch and the prime minister, appointed by the former at the advice of the latter and could be dismissed in the same manner or at the Emperor's own discretion. In five crown lands - the duchies of Salzburg, Carinthia, Carniola, Upper and Lower Silesia (commonly known as Austrian SIlesia) and Bukovina the territorial chief was called a Provincial President (Landespräsident) and his administrative office was called a Provincial Government (Landesregierung). The other twelve entities within the Austrian half of the Monarchy (the Princely County of Gorizia, the Margraviate of Istria and the Free Imperial City of Trieste were combined for administrative purposes into a crown land called the Coastal Land(s) or Küstenland, the three provincial parliaments were kept separated) had an Imperial–royal Stateholder (K.k. Statthalter) with an administrative office called an Office of the Stateholder or Stateholder's Chancellery (Statthalterei) Although the official designations were different, the institutions had exactly the same functions. Stateholders were appointed for the Kingdom of Bohemia, the Kingdom of Galicia and Lodomeria, the Archduchy of Austria down the River Enns, the Archduchy of Austria up the River Enns, the Duchy of Styria, the Margraviate of Moravia, the Princely Country of Tyrol (jointly administrated with the Province of Vorarlberg) and the joint Coastal Land.

Each entity had its own provincial parliament, called a Landtag, elected by the voters (some princely nobles were unelected members in their own right). The Emperor appointed one of its members as Landeshauptmann (i.e., provincial premier). The Landeshauptmann was the Speaker of the Landtag and thus a member of the provincial legislature. As the Landtag usually held ceremonial sessions once a year, the body elected its own Standing Conference (Landesausschuss), which both carried the legislative functions of the provincial parliament (when not in session) and a collective government for the departments of the provincial administration. In this role the Landeshauptmann and the Landesausschuss also belonged to the provincial executive and are the precursors of the modern provincial governments of the States of Austria. Many branches of the territorial administrations had great similarities with those of the State, so that their spheres of activity frequently overlapped and came into collision. This administrative "double track", as it was called, resulted largely from the origin of the State – for the most part through a voluntary union of countries that had a strong sense of their own individuality.

==== Local government ====
Below the territory was the district (Bezirk) under a district-head (Bezirkshauptmann), appointed by the State government. These district-heads united nearly all the administrative functions which were divided among the various ministries. Each district was divided into a number of municipalities (Ortsgemeinden), each with its own elected mayor (Bürgermeister). The nine statutory cities were autonomous units at the district-level.

The complexity of this system, particularly the overlap between State and territorial administration, led to moves for administrative reform. As early as 1904, premier Ernest von Koerber had declared that a complete change in the principles of administration would be essential if the machinery of State were to continue working. Richard von Bienerth's last act as Austrian premier in May 1911 was the appointment of a commission nominated by the Emperor to draw up a scheme of administrative reform. The imperial rescript did not present reforms as a matter of urgency or outline an overall philosophy for them. The continuous progress of society, it said, had made increased demands on the administration, that is to say, it was assumed that reform was required because of the changing times, not underlying problems with the administrative structure. The reform commission first occupied itself with reforms about which there was no controversy. In 1912 it published "Proposals for the training of State officials". The commission produced several further reports before its work was interrupted by the outbreak of World War I in 1914. It was not until March 1918 that the Seidler Government decided upon a program of national autonomy as a basis for administrative reform, which was, however, never carried into effect.

== Government of Transleithania ==
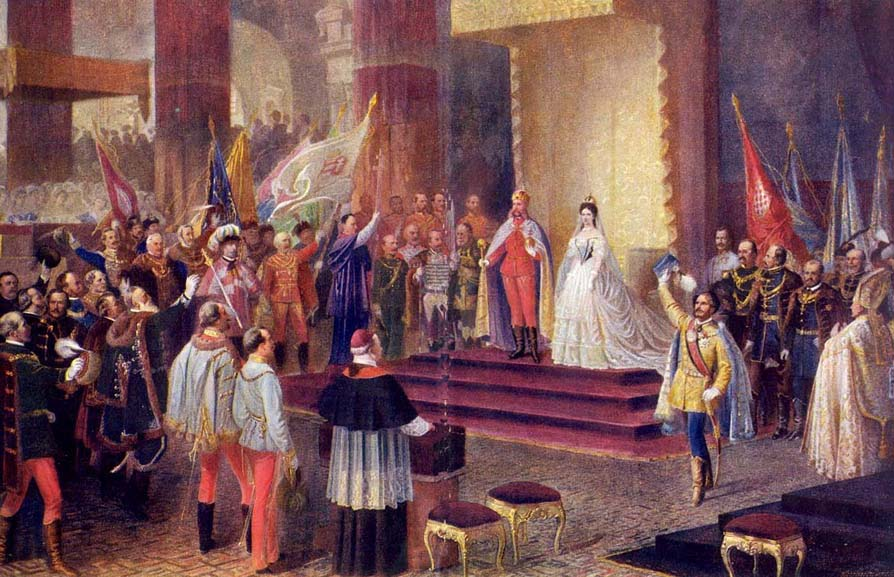
Coronation of Francis Joseph I and Elisabeth Amalie at Matthias Church, Buda, 8 June 1867

Map of the counties of the Lands of the Crown of St. Stephen (Hungary proper and Croatia-Slavonia)

The Emperor of the dual monarchy in his right of Apostolic King of Hungary and King of Croatia and Slavonia, ruler of the Hungarian part of the realm, officially named The Lands of the Holy Hungarian Crown (A Magyar Szent Korona országai) appointed the Government of Hungary. The Hungarian ministries carried the designation the Kingdom of Hungary's ... Ministry (sing. Magyar Királyi ...minisztérium), in which Royal stands for the Kaiser's title of Apostolic King of Hungary. Executive power in Transleithania was vested in a cabinet responsible to the National Assembly, consisting of ten ministers:

- the Prime Minister (Magyar Királyság miniszterelnök)
- Minister of Finance (Magyar Királyság Pénzügyminiszterium);
- Minister of the Interior
- Minister of Agriculture, Industry, and Trade, split into separate ministries of Agriculture (Magyar Királyság Földművelésügyi Minisztérium) and Trade (Magyar Királyság kereskedelemügyi Miniszterium) in 1889;
- Ministry of Public Works and Transport, folded into the ministry of trade in 1889;
- Minister of Justice (Magyar Királyság Igazságügy Miniszterium);
- Minister of National Defence (Magyar Királyság Honvédelmi Miniszterium);
- Minister of Religion and Public Education (Magyar Királyság Vallás- és Közoktatásügyi Miniszterium);
- Minister besides the King (A Király Személye Körüli Minisztérium), the liaison office in Vienna between the Emperor in his right of Apostolic King of Hungary and the Hungarian government and the
- Minister without Portfolio of Croatian, Slavonian and Dalmatian Affairs (Hungarian: Horvát-Szlavón-Dalmát Tárca Nélküli Miniszter or Croatian: Hrvatsko-slavonsko-dalmatinski Ministar bez Lisnice). As the Kingdom of Hungary was in personal union with the Kingdoms of Croatia and Slavonia, there was a minister at the Government of Hungary responsible for the limited autonomy of those regions.

From 1867 the administrative and political divisions of the lands belonging to the Hungarian crown were remodeled due to some restorations and other changes. In 1868 Transylvania was definitely reunited to Hungary proper, and the town and district of Fiume maintained its status as a Corpus separatum ("separate body"). The "Military Frontier" was abolished in stages between 1871 and 1881, with Banat and Šajkaška being incorporated into Hungary proper and the Croatian and Slavonian Military Frontiers joining Croatia-Slavonia.

=== Autonomous Government of Croatia-Slavonia ===
The Autonomous Government, officially Royal Croatian–Slavonian–Dalmatian Land Government (Croatian: Zemaljska vlada or Kraljevska hrvatsko–slavonsko–dalmatinska zemaljska vlada) was established in 1869 with its seat in Zagreb. The Autonomous Government included:

- the Ban (Hrvatski ban) - the head of the Autonomous Government;
- the Department of Internal Affairs (Odjel za unutarnje poslove);
- the Department of Religion and Education (Odjel za bogoštovlje i nastavu);
- the Department of Justice (Odjel za pravosuđe);
- the Department of National Economy (Odjel za narodno gospodarstvo) (from 1914).

=== Local administration and governments of Transleithania ===
In regard to local government, Hungary had traditionally been divided into around seventy counties (Hungarian: megyék, singular megye; Croatian: Croatian: županija) and an array of districts and cities with special statuses. This system was reformed in two stages. In 1870, most historical privileges of territorial subdivisions were abolished, but the existing names and territories were retained. At this point, there were a total of 175 territorial subdivisions: 65 counties (49 in Hungary proper, 8 in Transylvania, and 8 in Croatia), 89 cities with municipal rights, and 21 other types of municipality (3 in Hungary proper and 18 in Transylvania). In a further reform in 1876, most of the cities and other types of municipality were incorporated into the counties. The counties in Hungary were grouped into seven circuits, which had no administrative function. The lowest level subdivision was the district or processus (Hungarian: szolgabírói járás).

After 1876, some urban municipalities remained independent of the counties in which they were situated. There were 26 of these urban municipalities in Hungary: Arad, Baja, Debreczen, Győr, Hódmezővásárhely, Kassa, Kecskemét, Kolozsvár, Komárom, Marosvásárhely, Nagyvárad, Pancsova, Pécs, Pozsony, Selmecz- és Bélabanya, Sopron, Szabadka, Szatmárnémeti, Szeged, Székesfehervár, Temesvár, Újvidék, Versecz, Zombor, and Budapest, the capital of the country. In Croatia-Slavonia, there were four: Osijek, Varaždin and Zagreb and Zemun. Fiume continued to form a separate division.

The administration of the municipalities was carried on by an official appointed by the king. These municipalities each had a council of twenty members. Counties were led by a County head (Hungarian: Ispán or Croatian: župan) appointed by the king and under the control of the Ministry of the Interior. Each county had a municipal committee of 20 members, comprising 50% virilists (persons paying the highest direct taxes) and 50% elected persons fulfilling the prescribed census and ex officio members (deputy county head, main notary, and others). The powers and responsibilities of the counties were constantly decreased and were transferred to regional agencies of the kingdom's ministries.

== Government of the Bosnia and Herzegovina condominium ==
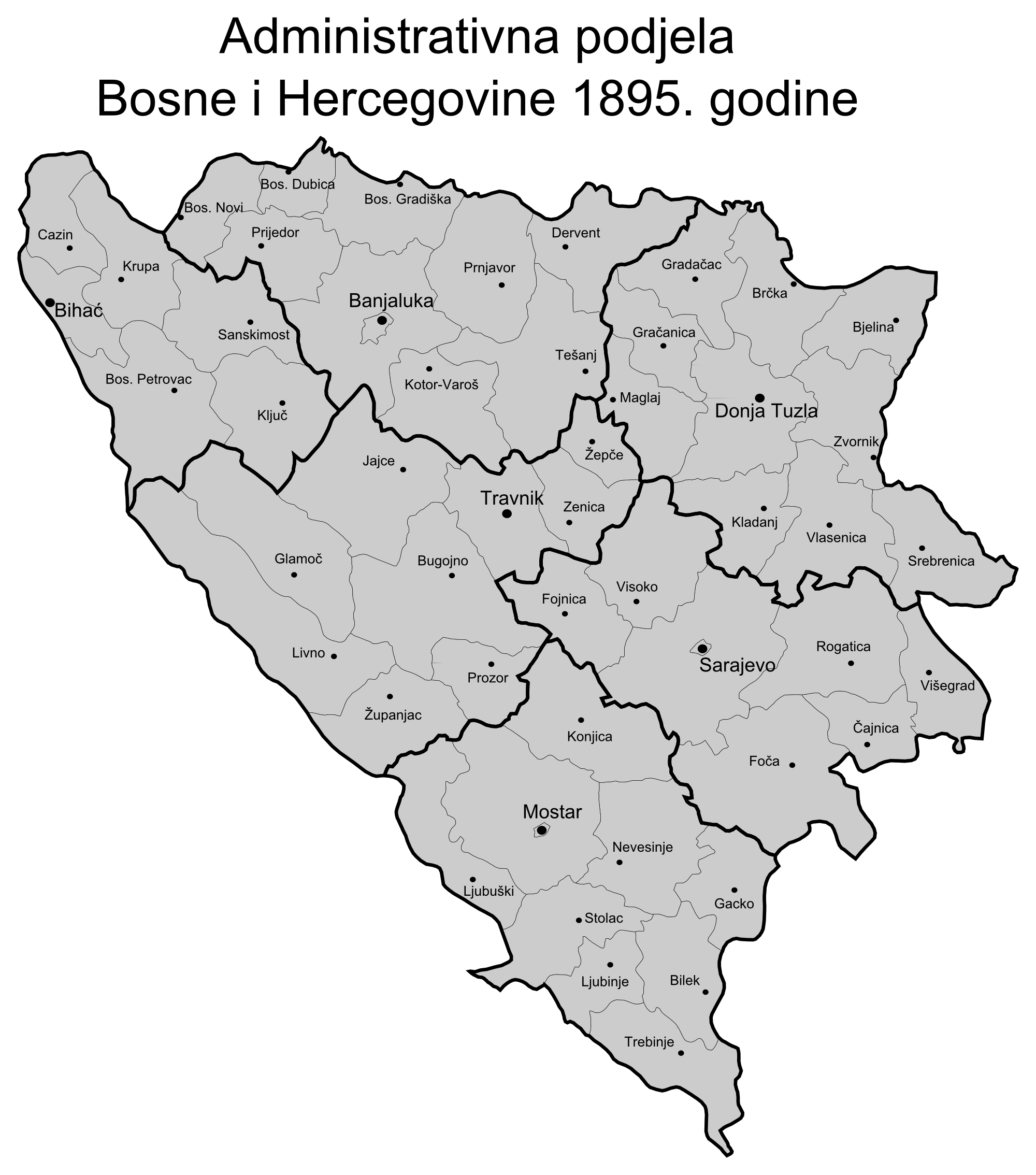
Circuits (Kreise) of Bosnia and Herzegovina: Banja Luka, Bihać, Mostar, Sarajevo, Travnik, Tuzla

The Government of Bosnia and Herzegovina was headed by a governor-general (German: Landsschef), who was both the head of the civil administration and the commander of the military forces based in Bosnia and Herzegovina. Due to the military functions of the position all nine governor-generals were army officers. The executive branch was headed by a National Council, which was chaired by the governor and contained the governor's deputy and chiefs of departments. At first, the government had only three departments, administrative, financial and legislative. Later, other departments, including construction, economics, education, religion, and technical, were founded as well. The administration of the country, together with the carrying out of the laws, devolved upon the Territorial Government in Sarajevo, which was subordinate and responsible to the Common Ministry of Finance. The existing administrative authorities of the Territory retained their previous organization and functions.

The Austrian-Hungarian authorities left the Ottoman division of Bosnia and Herzegovina untouched, and only changed the names of divisional units. Thus the Bosnia Vilayet was renamed Reichsland, sanjaks were renamed Kreise (Circuits), kazas were renamed Bezirke (Districts), and nahiyahs became Exposituren. There were six Kreise and 54 Bezirke. The heads of the Kreises were Kreiseleiters, and the heads of the Bezirke were Bezirkesleiters.

== Judicial system ==
=== Cisleithania ===
The December Constitution of 1867 restored the rule of law, independence of the judiciary, and public jury trials in Austria. The system of general courts had the same four rungs it still has today:

- District courts (Bezirksgerichte);
- Regional courts (Kreisgerichte);
- Higher regional courts (Oberlandesgerichte);
- Supreme Court (Oberster Gerichts- und Kassationshof).

Habsburg subjects would from now on be able to take the State to court should it violate their fundamental rights. Since regular courts were still unable to overrule the bureaucracy, much less the legislature, these guarantees necessitated the creation of specialist courts that could:

- The Administrative Court (Verwaltungsgerichtshof), stipulated by the 1867 Basic Law on Judicial Power (Staatsgrundgesetz über die richterliche Gewalt) and implemented in 1876, had the power to review the legality of administrative acts, ensuring that the executive branch remained faithful to the principle of the rule of law.
- The Imperial Court (Reichsgericht), stipulated by the Basic Law on the Creation of an Imperial Court (Staatsgrundgesetz über die Einrichtung eines Reichsgerichtes) in 1867 and implemented in 1869, decided demarcation conflicts between courts and the bureaucracy, between its constituent territories, and between individual territories and the Empire. The Imperial Court also heard complaints of citizens who claimed to have been violated in their constitutional rights, although its powers were not cassatory: it could only vindicate the complainant by declaring the government to be in the wrong, not by actually voiding its wrongful decisions.
- The State Court (Staatsgerichtshof) held the Emperor's ministers accountable for political misconduct committed in office. Although the Emperor could not be taken to court, many of his decrees now depended on the relevant minister to countersign them. The double-pronged approach of making the Emperor dependent on his ministers and also making ministers criminally liable for bad outcomes would firstly enable, secondly motivate the ministers to put pressure on the monarch.

=== Transleithania ===
Judicial power was also independent of the executive in Hungary. After the Croatian–Hungarian Settlement of 1868, Croatia-Slavonia had its own independent judicial system (the Table of Seven was the court of last instance for Croatia-Slavonia with final civil and criminal jurisdiction). The judicial authorities in Hungary were:

1. the district courts with single judges (458 in 1905);
2. the county courts with collegiate judgeships (76 in number); to these were attached 15 jury courts for press offences. These were courts of first instance. In Croatia-Slavonia these were known as the court tables after 1874;
3. Royal Tables (12 in number), which were courts of second instance, established at Budapest, Debrecen, Győr, Kassa, Kolozsvár, Marosvásárhely, Nagyvárad, Pécs, Pressburg, Szeged, Temesvár and Ban's Table at Zagreb.
4. The Royal Supreme Court at Budapest, and the Supreme Court of Justice, or Table of Seven, at Zagreb, which were the highest judicial authorities. There were also a special commercial court at Budapest, a naval court at Fiume, and special army courts.

=== Bosnia and Herzegovina condominium ===
The Territorial Statute introduced the modern rights and laws in Bosnia–Herzegovina, and it guaranteed generally the civil rights of the inhabitants of the Territory, namely citizenship, personal liberty, protection by the competent judicial authorities, liberty of creed and conscience, preservation of the national individuality and language, freedom of speech, freedom of learning and education, inviolability of the domicile, secrecy of posts and telegraphs, inviolability of property, the right of petition, and finally the right of holding meetings.

The existing judicial authorities of the Territory retained their previous organization and functions.

== Budget ==
Despite Austria and Hungary sharing a common currency, they were fiscally sovereign and independent entities. Since the beginnings of the personal union (from 1527), the government of the Kingdom of Hungary could preserve its separate and independent budget. After the revolution of 1848–1849, the Hungarian budget was amalgamated with the Austrian, and it was only after the Compromise of 1867 that Hungary obtained a separate budget once again.

== Voting rights ==
Towards the end of the 19th century, the Austrian half of the dual monarchy began to move towards constitutionalism. A constitutional system with a parliament, the Reichsrat was created, and a bill of rights was enacted also in 1867. Suffrage to the Reichstag's lower house was gradually expanded until 1907, when equal suffrage for all male citizens was introduced.

The 1907 Cisleithanian legislative election were the first elections held under universal male suffrage, after an electoral reform abolishing tax-paying requirements for voters had been adopted by the council and was endorsed by Emperor Franz Joseph earlier in the year. However, seat allocations were based on tax revenues from the States.

== Politics ==
The traditional aristocracy and land-based gentry class gradually faced increasingly wealthy men of the cities, who achieved wealth through trade and industrialization. The urban middle and upper class tended to seek their own power and supported progressive movements in the aftermath of revolutions in Europe.

As in the German Empire, the Austro-Hungarian Empire frequently used liberal economic policies and practices. From the 1860s, businessmen succeeded in industrializing parts of the Empire. Newly prosperous members of the bourgeoisie erected large homes and began to take prominent roles in urban life that rivaled the aristocracy's. In the early period, they encouraged the government to seek foreign investment to build up infrastructure, such as railroads, in aid of industrialization, transportation and communications, and development.

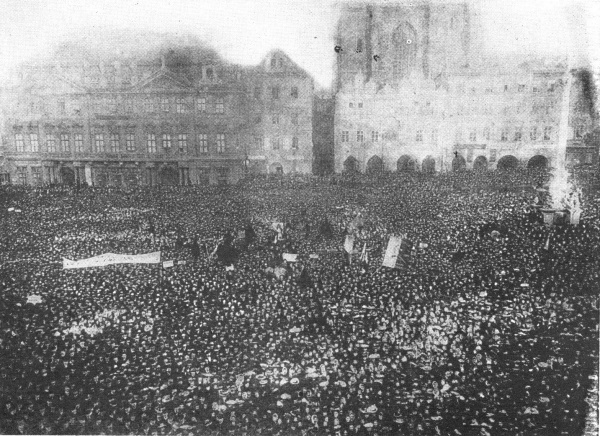
Demonstration for universal right to vote in Prague, Bohemia, 1905

The influence of liberals in Austria, most of them ethnic Germans, weakened under the leadership of Count Eduard von Taaffe, the Austrian prime minister from 1879 to 1893. Taaffe used a coalition of clergy, conservatives and Slavic parties to weaken the liberals. In Bohemia, for example, he authorized Czech as an official language of the bureaucracy and school system, thus breaking the German speakers' monopoly on holding office. Such reforms encouraged other ethnic groups to push for greater autonomy as well. By playing nationalities off one another, the government ensured the monarchy's central role in holding together competing interest groups in an era of rapid change.

During the First World War, rising national sentiments and labour movements contributed to strikes, protests and civil unrest in the Empire. After the war, republican, national parties contributed to the disintegration and collapse of the monarchy in Austria and Hungary. Republics were established in Vienna and Budapest.

Legislation to help the working class emerged from Catholic conservatives. They turned to social reform by using Swiss and German models and intervening in private industry. In Germany, Chancellor Otto von Bismarck had used such policies to neutralize socialist promises. The Catholics studied the Swiss Factory Act of 1877, which limited working hours for everyone and provided maternity benefits, and German laws that insured workers against industrial risks inherent in the workplace. These served as the basis for Austria's 1885 Trade Code Amendment.

The Austro-Hungarian compromise and its supporters remained bitterly unpopular among the ethnic Hungarian voters, and the continuous electoral success of the pro-compromise Liberal Party frustrated many Hungarian voters. While the pro-compromise liberal parties were the most popular among ethnic minority voters, the Slovak, Serb, and Romanian minority parties remained unpopular among the ethnic minorities. The nationalist Hungarian parties, which were supported by the overwhelming majority of ethnic Hungarian voters, remained in the opposition, except from 1906 to 1910 where the nationalist Hungarian parties were able to form government.

== Bibliography ==
- Brauneder, Wilhelm (2009). Österreichische Verfassungsgeschichte (in German) (11th ed.). Vienna: Manzsche Verlags- und Universitätsbuchhandlung. ISBN 978-3-214-14876-8.
- Džaja, Srećko M. (1994). Bosnien-Herzegowina in der österreichisch-ungarischen Epoche 1878–1918 (in German). Oldenbourg Wissenschaftsverlag. ISBN 3-486-56079-4.
- Hoke, Rudolf (1996). Österreichische und deutsche Rechtsgeschichte (in German) (2nd ed.). Vienna: Böhlau Studienbücher. ISBN 3-205-98179-0.
- Sked, Alan (1989). The Decline and Fall of the Habsburg Empire, 1815–1918. London: Longman.
- Taylor, A.J.P. (1964). The Habsburg monarchy, 1809–1918: a history of the Austrian Empire and Austria–Hungary (2nd ed.). London: Penguin Books.
- Zovko, Ljubomir (2007). Studije iz pravne povijesti Bosne i Hercegovine: 1878. - 1941 (in Croatian). University of Mostar. ISBN 978-9958-9271-2-6.
