= Karl von Stürgkh =

Austrian nobleman and politician (1859–1916)

Count Karl von Stürgkh
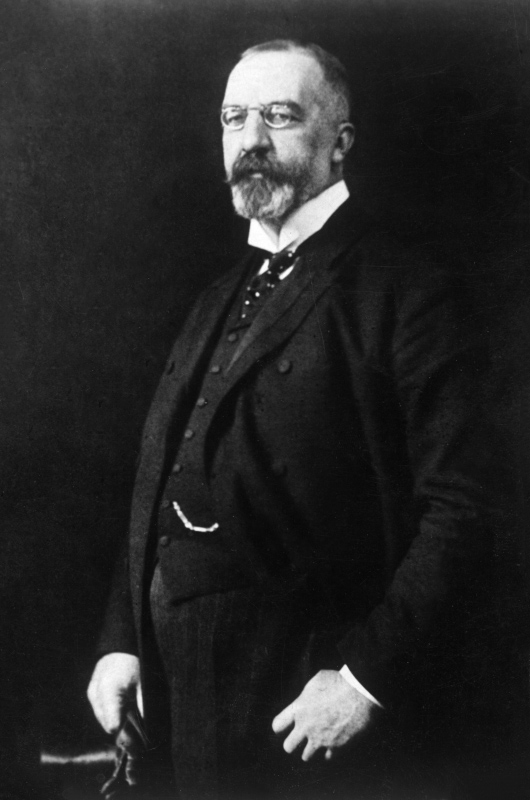
- Stürgkh in 1911

Minister-President of Austria
- In office 3 November 1911 – 21 October 1916
- Monarch: Francis Joseph I
- Preceded by: Paul Gautsch von Frankenthurn
- Succeeded by: Ernest von Koerber

Personal details
- Born: 30 October 1859 Graz, Austrian Empire
- Died: 21 October 1916 (aged 56) Vienna, Austria-Hungary

Count Karl von Stürgkh (30 October 1859 – 21 October 1916) was an Austrian politician and Minister-President of Cisleithania during the 1914 July Crisis that led to the outbreak of World War I. He was shot and killed by the Social Democratic politician Friedrich Adler.

== Biography ==
Stürgkh descended from a Styrian noble family (originally from the Bavarian Upper Palatinate region), which had been elevated to the status of Imperial Counts in 1721. He owned large estates in Halbenrain and was elected a member of the Austrian Imperial Council in 1891. From 1909 until 1911 he served as education minister in the cabinets of Richard von Bienerth-Schmerling and Paul Gautsch von Frankenthurn.

Gautsch resigned when rising prices led to bloody unrest in Vienna and even a shooting in parliament (the bullets just missed Stürgkh), whereafter Emperor Franz Joseph I of Austria appointed him Austrian Minister-President (Prime Minister) on 3 November 1911. He went on to rule the Cisleithanian lands autocratically: On 16 March 1914 he used the continuous filibustering in parliament to indefinitely adjourn the convenings of the Imperial Council and to pass laws by emergency decrees. This de facto elimination of the legislature turned out to be fatal in the following July Crisis, when upon the assassination of Archduke Franz Ferdinand of Austria the deputies were not able to interact with the government on the way to World War I.

Stürgkh together with Foreign Minister Leopold Berchtold and Chief-of-Staff Franz Conrad von Hötzendorf advocated a preventive strike against Serbia, mainly for internal reasons, in order to defy Pan-Slavism in the Bohemian, Carniolan and Croatian crown lands. After the declaration of war on 28 July, Stürgkh implemented a harsh censorship and kept refusing to convoke the parliament.

He served as Prime Minister until he was shot and killed by Friedrich Adler, son of the Social Democratic Party chairman Victor Adler, while having lunch in the Meissl & Schadn Hotel's dining room. Adler's action was a protest against Stürgkh's government without the legislature. Emperor Franz Joseph appointed Ernest von Koerber as Stürgkh's successor, one of his last official acts, as he died four weeks later. Adler was sentenced to death, pardoned by Emperor Charles I, and finally amnestied after the war.

Preceded by Paul Gautsch von Frankenthurn	Minister-President of Austria; 1911–1916	Succeeded by Ernst von Körber
