= Imperial Royal Privileged Austrian State Railway Company =

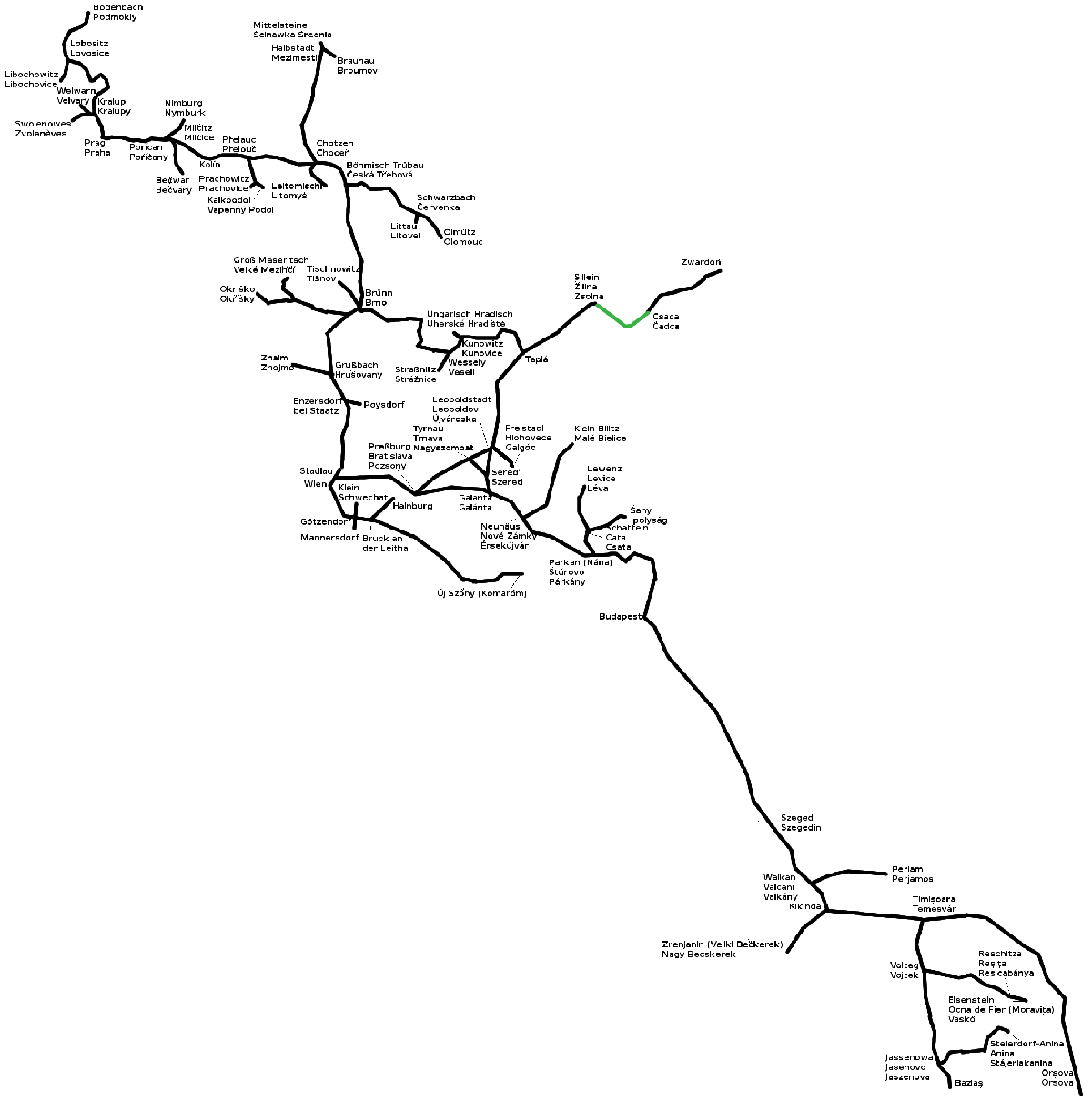
The StEG railway network

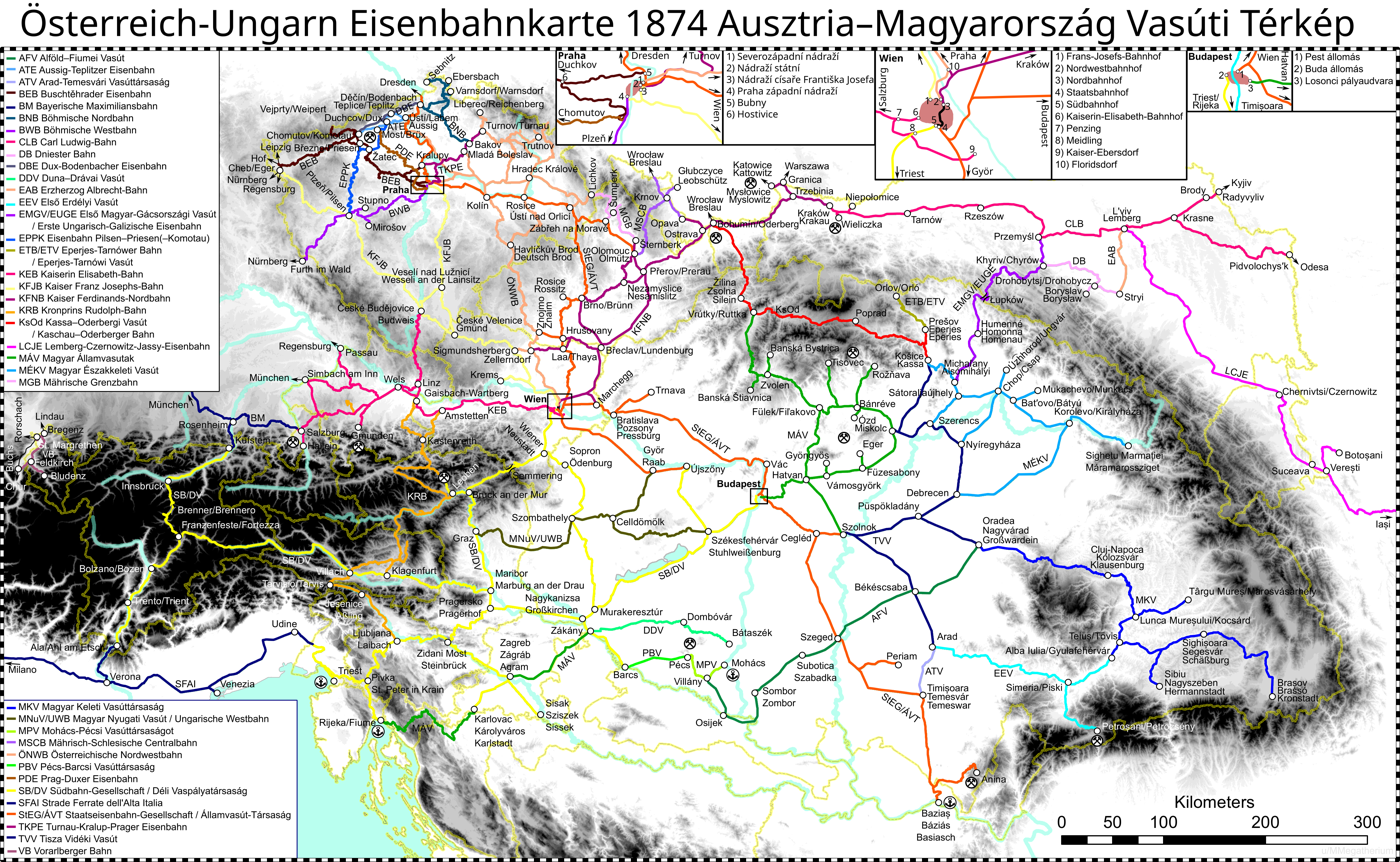
StEG network in comparison to other railway companies.

The Imperial Royal Privileged Austrian State Railway Company (German: k. k. privilegierte österreichische Staatseisenbahn-Gesellschaft), from 1 January 1883 the Privileged Austro-Hungarian State Railway Company (privilegierte österreichisch-ungarische Staatseisenbahn-Gesellschaft) was a private railway company in Austria-Hungary. Its title was abbreviated to State Railway Company (Staats-Eisenbahn-Gesellschaft) or StEG.

== History ==
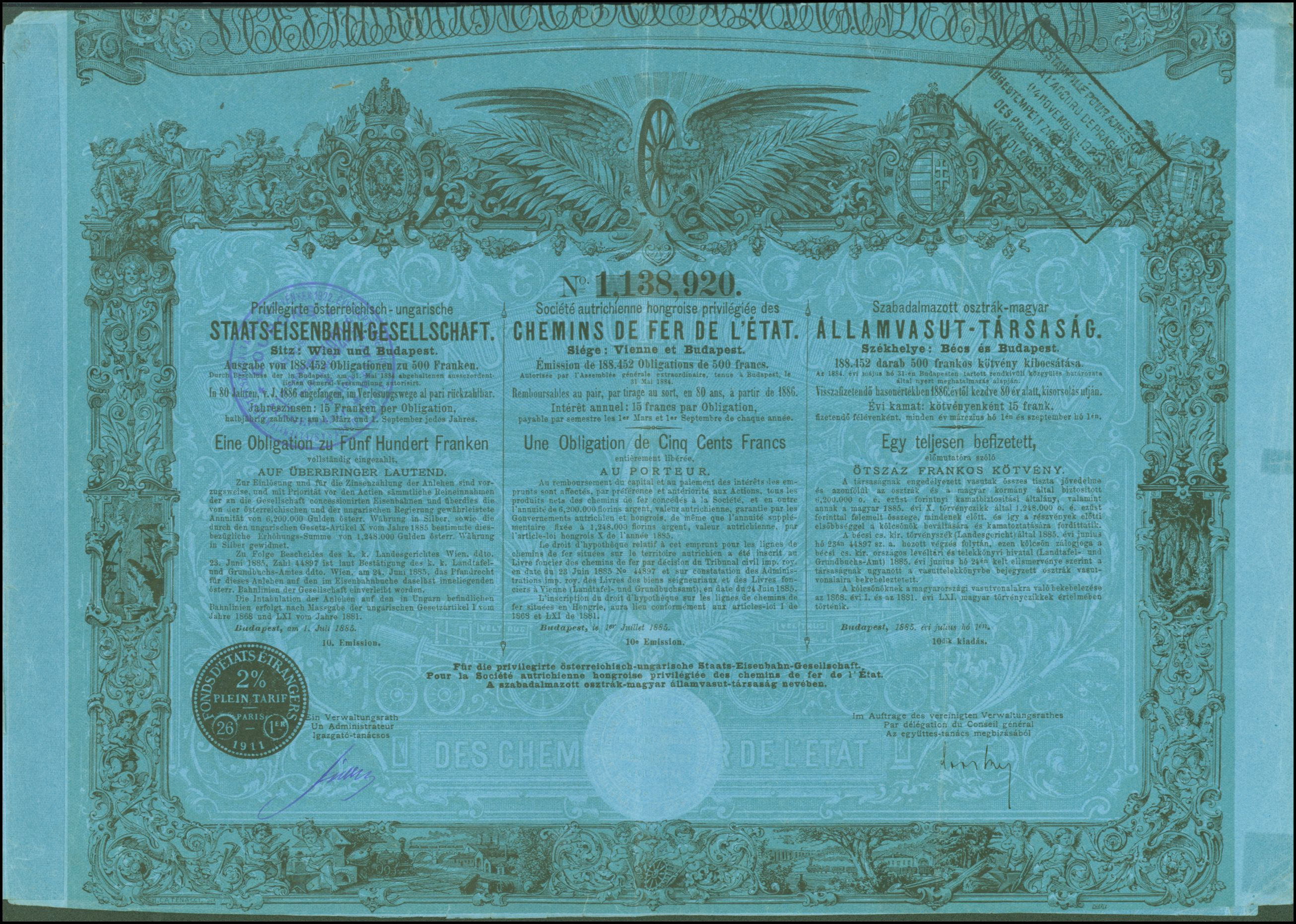
Bond of the Imperial Royal Privileged Austrian State Railway Company, issued 1 July 1885

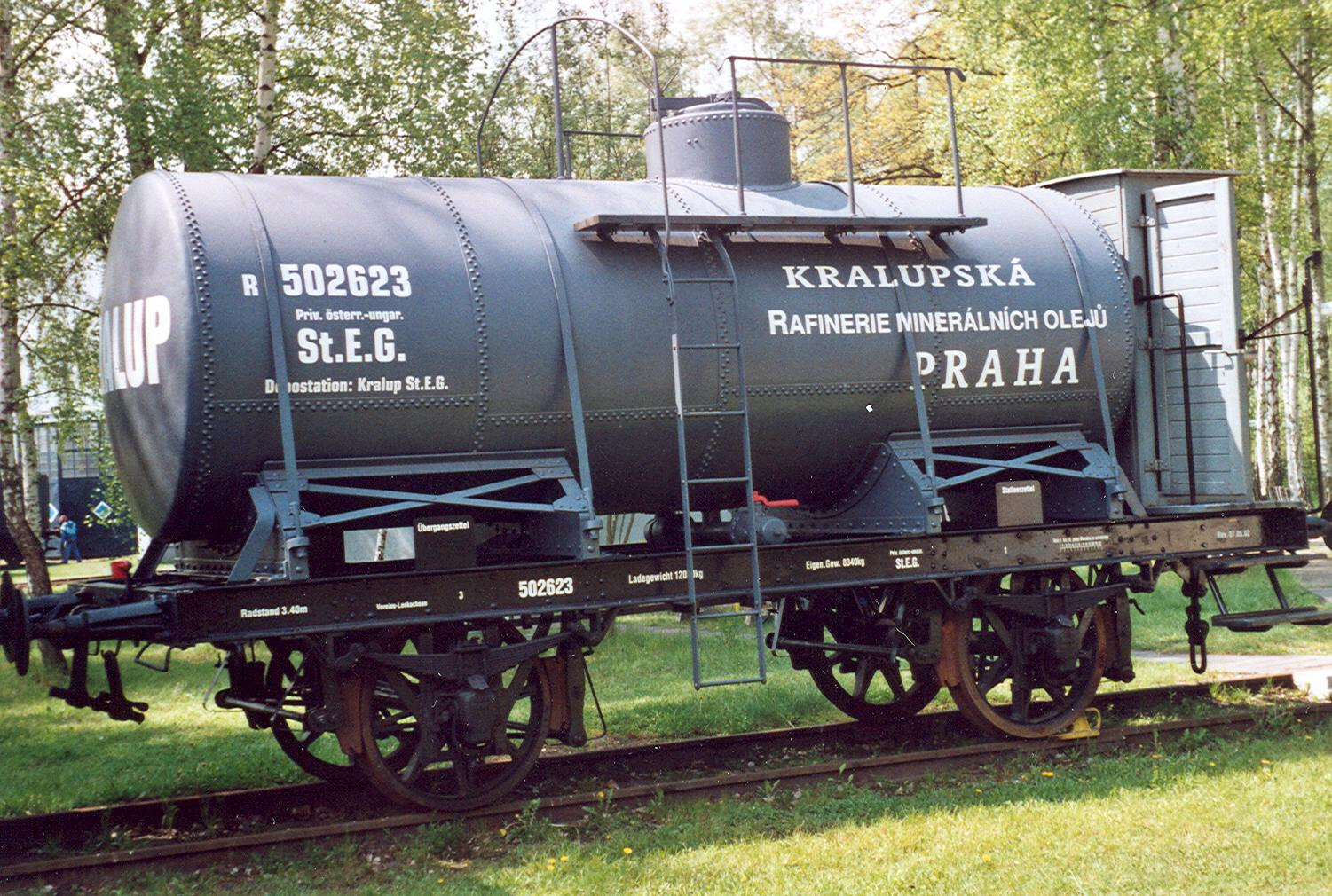
StEG tank wagon in the České dráhy Museum

The StEG was founded on 17 October 1854 primarily with French capital and on 1 January 1855 bought the Northern State Railway and the Austrian Southeastern Railway from the Austrian state, hence the unusual name of the new company. By procuring the Vienna–Raab railway on 13 February 1855 and the Brünn-Rossitz railway on 1 January 1879 and building new lines the StEG network within the Austrian part of the empire had grown by 1890 to around 1,350 km. In addition, there were 1,500 km of railway in Hungary.

On 15 October 1909, the StEG was nationalised and with it became a part of the Imperial Royal Austrian State Railways or kkStB. The routes on Hungarian territory had already been transferred to the Hungarian State Railway in 1891. That included the Bruck–Nickelsdorf and Marchegg–border sections, which did not come into the Federal Railways of Austria's (BBÖ) possession until 1920.

== In present-day Austria ==
In the territories which form the current Austria, the StEG network covered a total of about 255 km. Its start point was the state railway station in Vienna, later the Ostbahnhof, which is now part of the Hauptbahnhof. One main line headed south towards Budapest and passed through Götzendorf to Bruck an der Leitha (1846), where until 1920 the border with Hungary lay, and on to the present-day border station of Nickelsdorf (1855). From 1884, the line branched in Götzendorf to Klein Schwechat on the one hand and Mannersdorf on the other. In 1886 to 1887, a line was built from Bruck via Bad Deutsch Altenburg to Hainburg an der Donau.

The line from Vienna in the northern direction was opened in 1870 and crossed the Danube and then divided at Stadlau to reach Marchegg and Bratislava in the east; the other branch ran via Mistelbach and Laa an der Thaya to Brno in the north. Not until 1888 was the branch from Enzersdorf bei Staatz to Poysdorf added.

In addition, a short domestic line in Vienna from the Erdbergerlände to the horse racing track at Freudenau was built in 1886.

== Routes ==
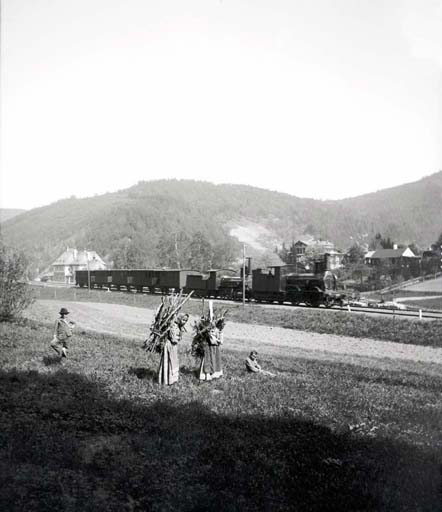
A train with a StEG I at Adamov on the Brünn–Böhm line. Trübau (around 1893)

Main lines

- Vienna–Wolkersdorf–Mistelbach–Laa/Thaya–Brno–Prague–Děčín
- Vienna–Budapest–Temeswar
- Vienna–Preßburg
- Chotzen–Halbstadt (*1875)
- Halbstadt–Mittelsteine (*1876/1889)
- Václavice–Starkoč (*1876)
- Uherské Hradiště–Uherský Brod
- Enzersdorf bei Staatz–Poysdorf (*1886)
- Brno–Vlara Pass (state border)–Tepla (*1887)
- Götzendorf an der Leitha–Klein-Schwechat
- Götzendorf an der Leitha–Mannersdorf am Leithagebirge
- Bruck an der Leitha–Hainburg an der Donau

Branch lines

- Lobositz–Libochowitz (*1882)
- Kralupp–Welwarn (*1882)
- Přelouč–Prachovice/Vápenný Podol (*1882)
- Kralupp–Zvolenowes (*1886)
- Choceň–Litomyšl (*1882)

== Lines owned by other companies, operated by StEG ==
- Brandýs nad Labem–Neratovice railway (*1899)
- Aujezd–Luhatschowitz railway (*1905)
- Nemotitz–Koritschan railway (*1908)

== See also ==
- Imperial Royal Austrian State Railways
- Lokomotivfabrik der StEG

== Sources ==
- Richard Heinersdorff: Die k. und k. privilegierten Eisenbahnen der österreichisch-ungarischen Monarchie 1828-1918. Vienna-Munich, 1975
