= Heinrich Ritter von Wittek =

Austrian politician

Hochwohlgeboren Heinrich Ritter von Wittek
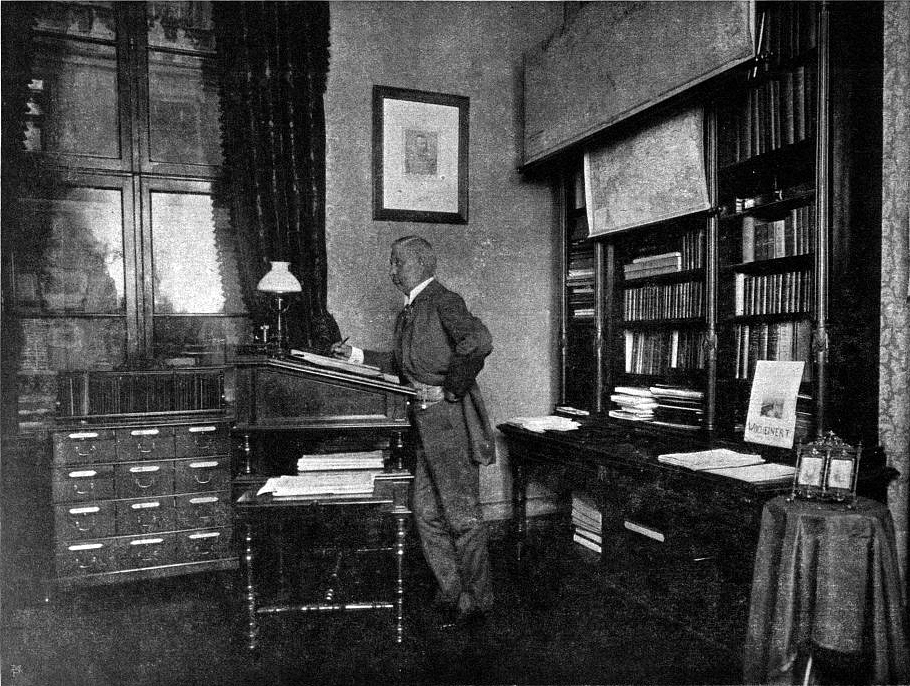
- Minister Wittek at his office in Vienna, 1901

Minister-President of Austria
- In office 21 December 1899 – 18 January 1900
- Monarch: Franz Joseph I of Austria
- Preceded by: Manfred von Clary und Aldringen
- Succeeded by: Ernest von Koerber

Personal details
- Born: 29 January 1844 Vienna, Austrian Empire
- Died: 9 April 1930 (aged 86) Vienna, Austria
- Party: Christian Social Party
- Education: University of Vienna

Heinrich Ritter von Wittek (29 January 1844 – 9 April 1930) was an Austrian politician of the Christian Social Party (CS). He served as head of the k.k. Railway Ministry and as Minister-President of Cisleithania for four weeks in 1899/1900.

== Life ==
Heinrich Wittek was born in the Austrian capital Vienna, the eldest son of Johann Marzellin Wittek (1801–1876), an officer of the Imperial and Royal Army, who shortly after Heinrich's birth was appointed an educator of the Habsburg archdukes, the sons of Archduke Franz Karl. The boy grew up at the Austrian court and especially befriended with Archduke Ludwig Viktor, younger brother of Emperor Franz Joseph I, who was almost of the same age. His father was ennobled in 1858 and elevated to the hereditary rank of Ritter in 1871.

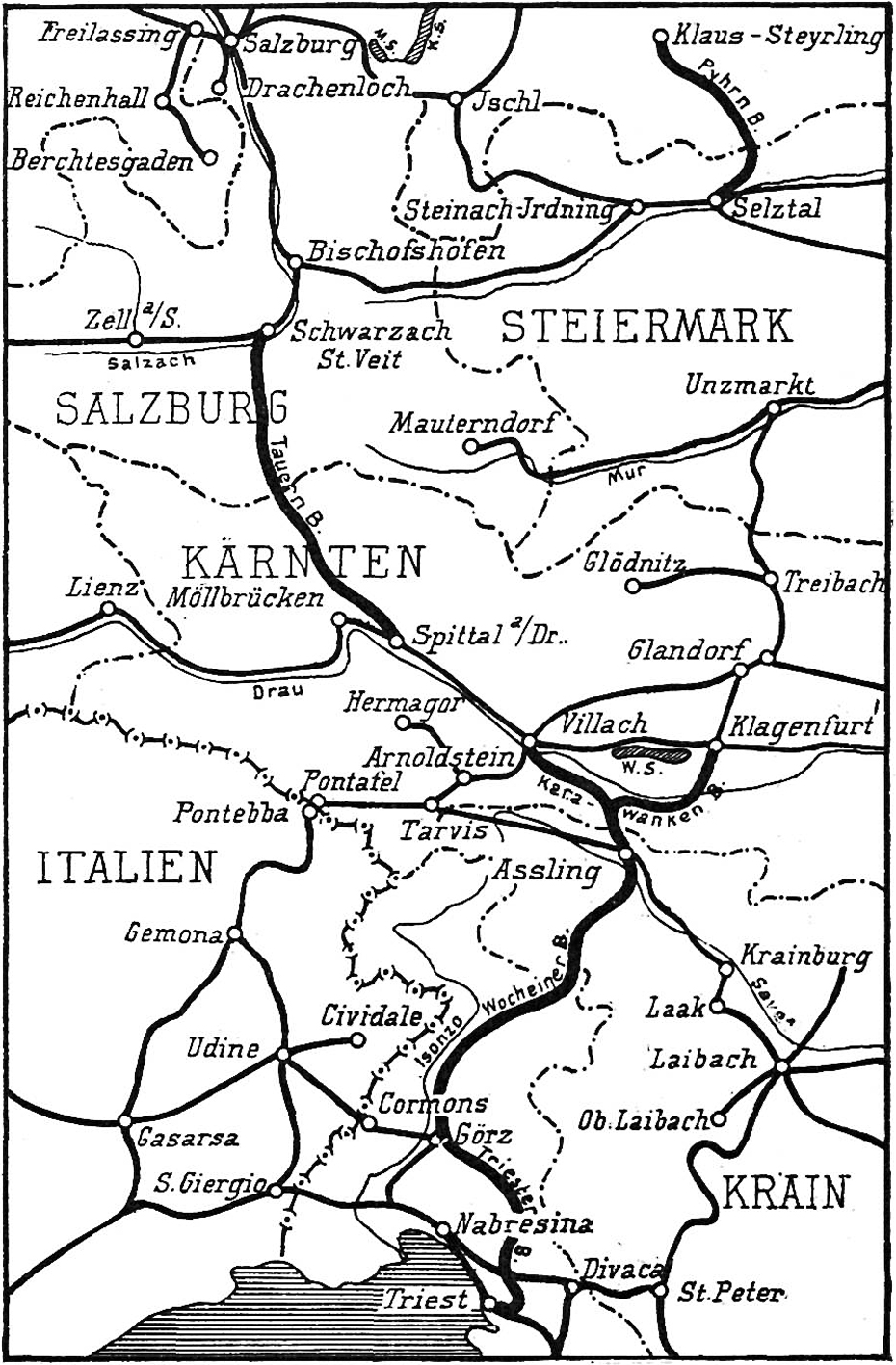
Map of the New Alpine Railways (1921)

Wittek attended the Vienna Schottengymnasium, where he obtained his Matura degree, and went on to study law at the University of Vienna. Having received his doctorate, he began a career as a state official at the Austrian Ministry of Commerce, where he was concerned with the establishment of the Imperial Royal Austrian State Railways upon the Long Depression from 1873 onwards. As a proven expert, he was promoted to head of the railway department in 1886 and led the ministry for a short while in 1895.

On 30 November 1897, Wittek was appointed Railway Minister in the Austrian government of Minister-President Paul Gautsch von Frankenthurn, a post he held in various succeeding Austrian cabinets until 1 May 1905. Upon the resignation of Count Manfred von Clary-Aldringen on 21 December 1899, he also served as acting Austrian Minister-President until the appointment of Ernest von Koerber on 18 January 1900.

During Wittek's time in office, the public railroad network of the Imperial Royal Austrian State Railways was significantly enlarged by an extensive construction programme, as decided by the Austrian Imperial Council parliament in 1901, including the Alpine Bohinj and Tauern Railway lines. Wittek is also credited with improving the social conditions of the railway employees. However, as the building projects suffered substantial cost overruns, he lost support and finally handed in his resignation on 1 May 1905.

A few days later, his CS party colleague Mayor Karl Lueger made him an honorary citizen of Vienna. On August 16 he was appointed life peer of the Austrian House of Lords by Emperor Franz Joseph I. Upon the 1907 legislative election, he succeeded Mayor Karl Lueger as a CS member of the House of Deputies.

Wittek died in Vienna and was buried in the Hietzing Cemetery.

== See also ==
- Portrait
