= Austrian Southeastern Railway =

The Austrian Southeastern Railway or Imperial-Royal Southeastern Railway (German: k.k. Südöstliche Staatsbahn) or kkSöStB was a state railway in Austria-Hungary, which was formed when the Hungarian Central Railway was (Ungarische Zentralbahn, UZB) was nationalised.

== History ==
On 15 July 1846, the UZB opened the lines from Pest to Waitzen (now Vac), Pest to Szolnok and Marchegg to Pressburg (now Bratislava). The UZB was nationalised on 7 March 1850 and became the Imperial Royal Southeastern State Railway. The lines from Pressburg to Waitzen and Cegléd via Félegyháza to Szeged begun by the HZB were completed by the SöStB in 1854. On 1 January, 1855 the SöStB was privatised and became part of the StEG.

== Lines ==
- Pest–Waitzen (opened 15 July 1846 by the UZB)
- Pest–Szolnok (opened 1 September 1847 by the UZB)
- Marchegg–Pressburg (opened 10 August 1848 by the UZB)
- Pressburg–Waitzen (opened 1850; begun by the UZB and finished by the SöStB)
- Cegléd–Félegyháza (opened 1853; begun by the UZB and finished by the SöStB)
- Félegyháza–Szeged (opened 1854; begun by the UZB and finished by the SöStB)

== Literature ==
- Bernhard Neuner (2002), Bibliographie der österreichischen Eisenbahnen von den Anfängen bis 1918 (in German), vol. Band 2, Vienna: Walter Drews Verlag, ISBN 3-901949-00-3
- Johann Stockklausner (1979), Dampfbetrieb in Alt-Österreich (in German), Vienna: Verlag Slezak, ISBN 3-900134-41-3
