= Ernest von Koerber =

Austrian statesman (1850–1919)

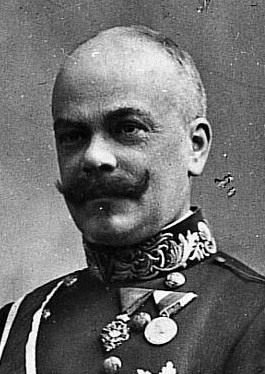

Minister-President of Austria
- In office 29 October 1916 – 20 December 1916
- Monarchs: Franz Joseph I Charles I
- Preceded by: Karl von Stürgkh
- Succeeded by: Heinrich von Clam-Martinic
- In office 19 January 1900 – 31 December 1904
- Monarch: Franz Joseph I
- Preceded by: Heinrich von Witteck
- Succeeded by: Paul Gautsch von Frankenthurn

Personal details
- Born: 6 November 1850 Trento, Tyrol, Austrian Empire
- Died: 5 March 1919 (aged 68) Baden bei Wien, Lower Austria, Austria

Ernest Karl Franz Joseph Thomas Friedrich von Koerber (6 November 1850 – 5 March 1919) was an Austrian liberal statesman who served as prime minister of the Austrian portion of Austria-Hungary from 1900 to 1904 and again in 1916.

== Biography ==
Ernest von Koerber was born in Trento, Tyrol, Austrian Empire, in a German speaking family, the son of a Gendarmerie officer. Koerber attended the elite Theresianum boarding school in Vienna and, having obtained his Matura degree, went on to study law at the University of Vienna. He became extremely involved in Austrian culture and politics. The study of the Rechtsstaat ("legal state") doctrine, or constitutionality and civil rights was popular during Koerber's teen years and Koerber and his constitutionally-minded peers such as Sieghart, Steinbach, Baernreither, and Redlich learned and immersed themselves in this principle.

== Political career ==
Koerber’s knowledge of government was apparent when in 1874 he launched his career in the civil service, entering the Austrian Ministry of Commerce. In 1895 he was appointed general manager of the Imperial Royal Austrian State Railways and obtained the honorific title of a Geheimrat the following year. By 1897 Koerber was a member of the Imperial Council parliament of Cisleithania (i.e. the 'Austrian' portion of Austria-Hungary) and Commerce Minister. At this time, after the Austro-Hungarian Compromise of 1867, there were separate internal governments for the Austrian lands and the Kingdom of Hungary. Two years later in 1899, Koerber rose to the position of Austrian Minister of the Interior. In 1900, Emperor Franz Joseph asked Koerber to create a cabinet and serve as prime minister. This was by far the most influential position of Koerber’s career. Koerber served in this capacity until the end of 1904.

=== First Koerber cabinet ===
From the beginning of his term in office, Minister-President Koerber encountered many difficulties. Within the multinational Dual Monarchy, he had full authority only over the Cisleithania crown lands. Furthermore, the Imperial Council parliament was politically weak. In order to make major liberal reforms Koerber depended largely on Article 14, a provision in the December Constitution which allowed the Emperor to issue an “emergency regulation” for any necessary purposes. The meetings of the Imperial Council quickly transformed into forums for Koerber to bargain with party leaders.

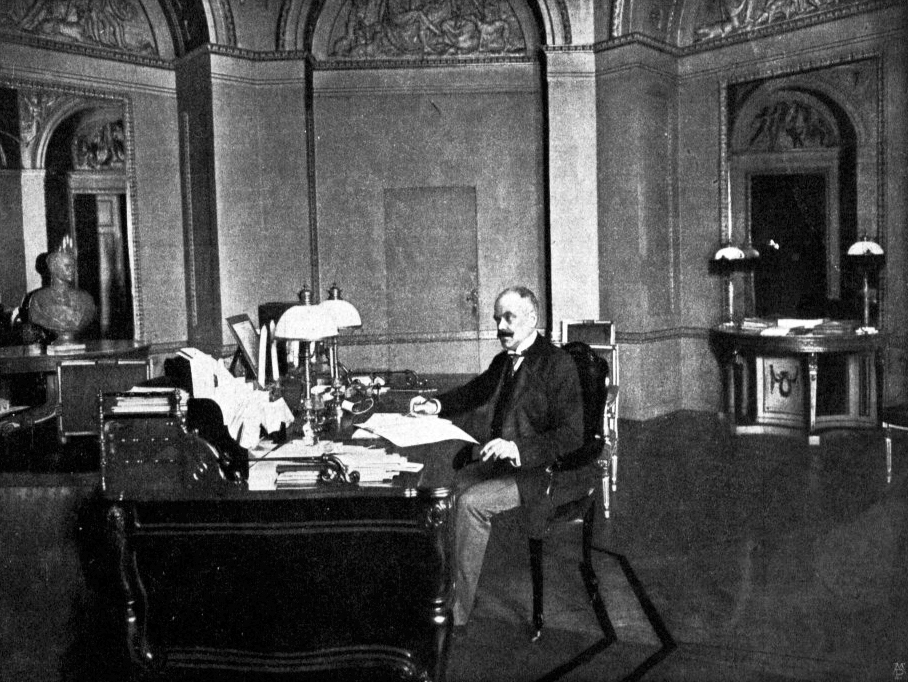
Minister-President Koerber in office, 1901

Koerber’s tenure in office was also marked by rising national tensions within Austria-Hungary. The Dual Monarchy dissipated any sense of allegiance to a single crown. The various ethnic groups resented one another and it became apparent that most government actions would leave at least one offended group.

In military matters, Koerber opposed providing the Hungarian portion of the Austro-Hungarian Army (the Royal Hungarian Honvéd) with its own artillery units. While the emperor advocated such a policy, Koerber sided with crown prince Archduke Franz Ferdinand against it, stating that the principle of parity would require the Imperial-Royal Landwehr to also have artillery, which Austria could not afford.

Even education was a controversial aspect within the monarchy. The Italians in the Habsburg lands of Tyrol and the Littoral could no longer get a university education within the borders of Austria after it lost Venetia in 1866. Koerber sought to fix this problem and presented a draft law establishing an Italian university. However widespread disapproval from Germans culminated in riots during the aborted inauguration of the first course, to be opened in Innsbruck in November 1904 This forced the government to abandon this project. Koerber also attempted to institute a “National University” with German as the language of teaching but the Italians and Slavs protested this plan.

Koerber pursued reform for the infrastructure of the country, particularly railways and canals. These expansive reforms known as the Koerber-Plan were made in efforts to appease the Imperial Council and create a sense of regionalism with non-controversial government reforms. Despite Koerber's efforts, these changes did not provide the reaction he expected and attention once again shifted towards the nationality question.

Additionally, Koerber aimed to promote the industrial and communications sectors. He abolished censorship of the press. Koerber believed this would benefit the changing and expansive monarchy. Koerber also exhibited his liberal ideology by reducing the harsh persecution of Social Democrats, allowing them to organize openly in Austria. This was a tremendous stride in individual rights.

Coupled with these strategies was Koerber's economic savvy. Koerber got the Imperial Council to enact his 1902 economic development program without resorting to Article 14. But once again, it was to no avail. Many historians believe that Koerber’s emphasis on economic matters over national issues made his administration highly unpopular. Ethnic hostilities ensued despite his attempts at reform. The lack of transition within the state diminished Koerber's dreams and he eventually resigned from office on 31 December 1904, officially on health grounds. Koerber was succeeded by Paul Gautsch von Frankenthurn, Minister of Education.

== Second Koerber cabinet ==
Koerber returned to the spotlight during World War I. From 7 February 1915 to 28 October 1916, he served as Austro-Hungarian Finance Minister (one of three k.u.k common ministries which served both countries). In the ongoing discussions on the goals of the war, Koerber strictly opposed Foreign Minister Stephan Burián's ideas to annex Russian Congress Poland (Vistula Land), stating that it could further weaken the cohesion and political balance of the Dual Monarchy.

After the Austrian minister-president Count Karl von Stürgkh was assassinated by Friedrich Adler on 21 October 1916, aged Emperor Franz Joseph quickly recalled Koerber to return as his successor. Many had hoped that Koerber would modify the tyrannical system that had developed during wartime. However, after Franz Joseph's death on November 21, Koerber came into conflict with the new emperor, Charles I, and did not make such changes. In fact, the constant disputes made it difficult for Koerber to get anything accomplished. Koerber still held out hope that Austria and Hungary were able to unite, both politically and socially. Charles I, however, continued to take measures that would hinder this progress. Koerber, an aged man by this point, decided he could no longer take these differences. His resignation was caused by several issues, the most important of which was his belief that the planned convocation of the Austrian parliament was premature, but Charles I wanted to present himself as a constitutional monarch as soon as possible. Furthermore, he objected to what he considered to be too extensive concessions to Hungary in the new compromise, whereas the emperor did not want to risk jeopardizing the relationship with Hungary.

A few weeks later, on December 13, Koerber officially retired from office and was succeeded by Heinrich Clam-Martinic. He died shortly after the end of the war, on 5 March 1919, in Baden, a spa town near Vienna.

== Support for Zionism ==
Koerber was a friend and supporter of Theodor Herzl. He was impressed by his Zionist project and assured Herzl that he would stand behind him in his endeavors to win a charter for Jewish settlement in Palestine.
