= Imperial Royal Austrian State Railways =

Transport company

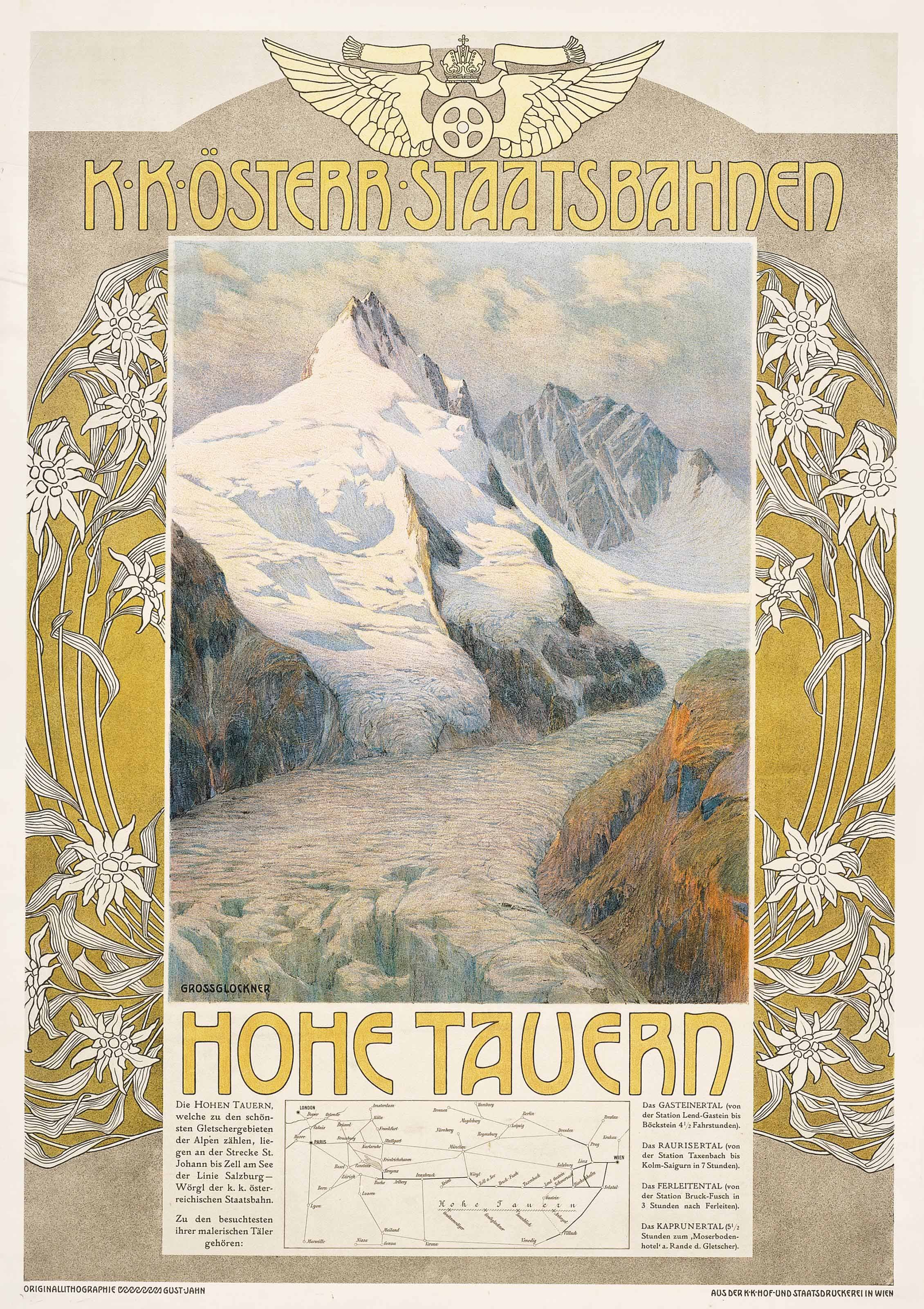
kkStB Salzburg-Wörgl railway poster advertising, c. 1900

The Imperial-Royal State Railways (German: k.k. Staatsbahnen) abbr. kkStB) or Imperial-Royal Austrian State Railways (k.k. österreichische Staatsbahnen,) was the state railway organisation in the Cisleithanian (Austrian) part of the Austro-Hungarian Monarchy.

== History ==
The introduction of railway traffic in the Austrian Empire had been pushed by pioneers like physicist Franz Josef Gerstner (1756–1832), who advocated a railway connection from the Vltava basin across the Bohemian Massif to the Danube river. After in 1810 a first 22 kilometres (14 mi) long horse-drawn railway line was built at the Eisenerz mine in Styria for the transport of iron stones, in 1832 a wagonway between Austrian Linz and České Budějovice (Budweis) in Bohemia opened. It was 128.8 kilometres (80.0 mi) long and was the second interurban railway in continental Europe (after the French Saint-Étienne to Andrézieux Railway line opened in 1827). The southern continuation from Linz to Gmunden was finished in 1836.

The first section of a new steam locomotive railway from the Austrian capital Vienna to Kraków in the Kingdom of Galicia and Lodomeria operated by the Emperor Ferdinand Northern Railway company opened in 1837. Designed by Franz Xaver Riepl, it was financed by the banker Salomon Mayer von Rothschild. The line then was the second solely steam-powered railway on the continent, after the inauguration of the Belgian Brussels–Mechelen railway line in 1835.

=== 1841 railway programme ===
While the Northern Railway prospered, private investors held back on financing further railroad constructions and the expansion of the Austrian network came to a standstill. Nevertheless, after initial hesitation, the Austrian government took a keen interest in railways, and launched a public investment programme in 1841.

The Northern Railway in Lower Austria was completed up to the Bohemian border at Bernhardsthal, a branch-off from Olmütz (Olomouc) and Brünn (Brno) to Prague was opened in 1845/49. In 1851, construction works reached the northern imperial border with Saxony at Bodenbach, where the Northern Railway received access to the Royal Saxon State Railways.

Beside the extension of the Northern Railway, plans for the construction of a Southern Railway (Südbahn) from Vienna to the Adriatic seaport at Trieste via Semmering Pass and Graz were finally carried out. Opened in 1857, it was then operated by the private Austrian Southern Railway company. In the Kingdom of Lombardy–Venetia, the first section of the Milan–Venice railway was opened in 1842. Plans for a connection to Trieste became obsolete upon the loss of Lombardy after the Second Italian War of Independence in 1859. First construction works on the projected Western Railway (Westbahn) line to the border with Bavaria via Linz and Salzburg got stuck in the beginning.

By late 1854, 994 kilometres (618 mi) out of 1,443 kilometres (897 mi) of Austrian railway lines were state owned (almost 70%). After 1854, however, because of financial crisis in the Empire, the railways were sold at prices cut to the bone, many of them to French investors. Concessions for new private companies, like the Imperial Royal Privileged Austrian State Railway Company, were granted.

=== Austrian state railways ===
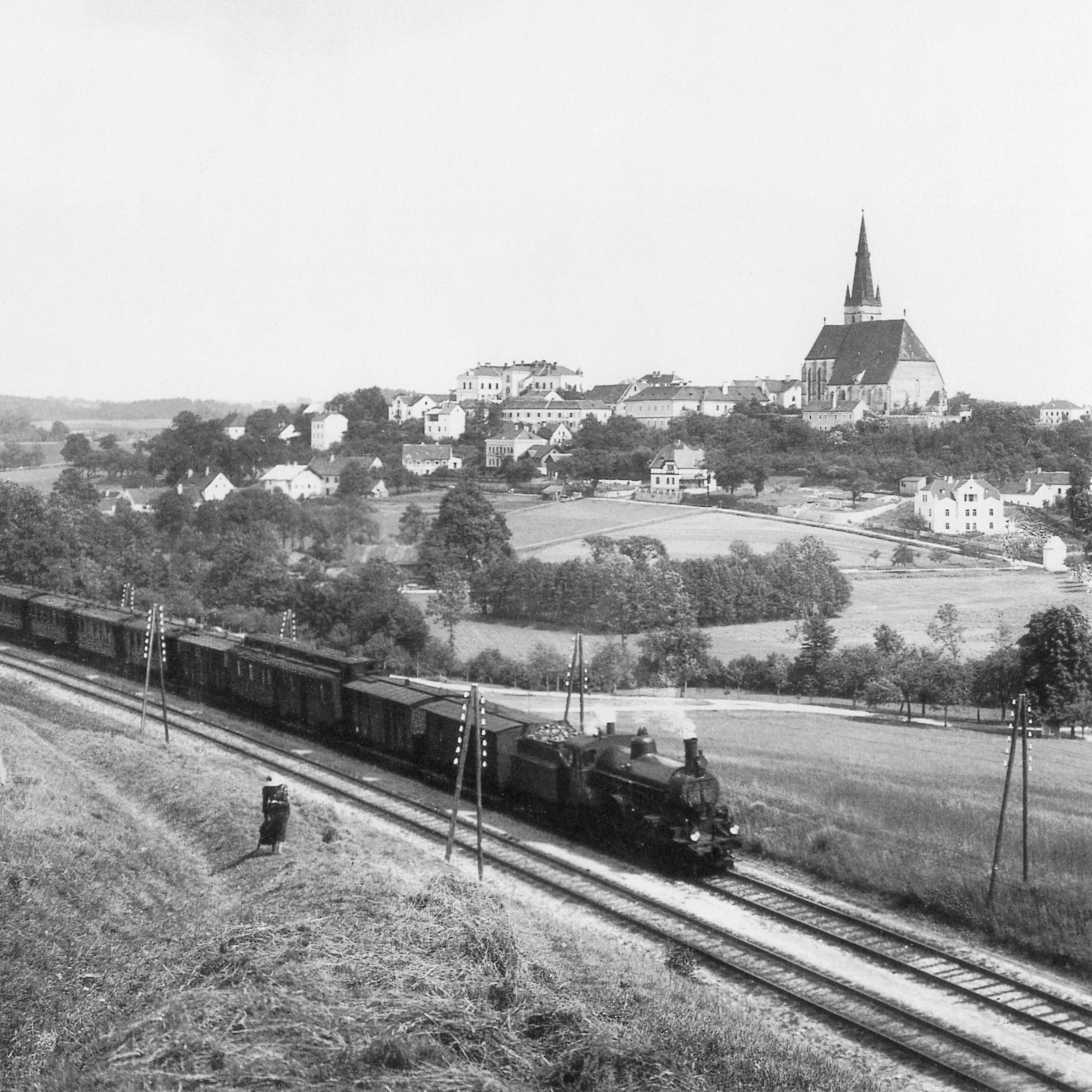
KkStB Westbahn train near Haag, Lower Austria, about 1900

After the Austro-Hungarian Compromise of 1867, the Transleithanian (Hungarian) lines of the Dual Monarchy were nationalized as the Hungarian State Railways (MÁV). Already in 1866, the Austrian trade minister Bernhard von Wüllerstorf-Urbair had urged for a greater government commitment. A re-evaluation started in the Long Depression, sparked by the Panic of 1873. The Vienna stock market crash resulted in the bankruptcy of several Austrian railway companies, and the state took them over.

With effect from 1 January 1884, the k.k. Generaldirektion der Staatsbahnen ("Imperial-Royal General Directorate of the State Railways") was founded, situated at the Austrian Ministry of Trade; this was the birth of the Imperial-Royal State Railways. Operations Divisions were established in Vienna, Linz, Innsbruck, Villach, Budweis, Pilsen, Prague, Cracow, Lemberg, Pola, and Spalato. By the end of 1884 the state railway network covered 5,103 km.

On 15 January 1896, Emperor Franz Joseph I, at the suggestion of Minister President Count Kasimir Felix Badeni, approved the establishment of the k.k. Eisenbahnministerium ("Imperial-Royal Rail Ministry"). Further divisions were founded in Triest, Olmütz and Stanislau. Minister Heinrich von Wittek promoted the expansion of the Wiener Stadtbahn network and the Neue Alpenbahnen project providing the Alps with major rail crossings, including the Tauern Railway and the Bohinj Railway, realised upon a 1901 resolution passed by the Imperial Council legislature.

By nationalizing other companies or taking over their traffic, the State Railways obtained a practical monopoly in rail transport. After the acquisition of the Emperor Ferdinand Northern Railway Company in 1906, followed by the Imperial Royal Privileged Austrian State Railway Company and the Austrian Northwestern Railway in 1909, the Southern Railway was the only major company that remained private until the end of Empire. In 1914, of a total of 22,981 km of railway tracks on Austrian territory, 18,859 (82%) were state owned.

=== Dissolution ===
After the end of the World War I and the dissolution of Austria-Hungary, the Imperial-Royal Rail Ministry was disestablished on 12 November 1918 by resolution of the Provisional Assembly of German-Austria. The vehicle fleet and infrastructure of former kkStB were divided among state railway companies of the successor states of the Dual Monarchy:

- Austria: Deutschösterreichische Staatsbahnen (DÖStB), renamed Österreichische Staatsbahnen (ÖStB) in 1919 and Österreichische Bundesbahnen (ÖBB) in 1923
- Poland: Polskie Koleje Państwowe (PKP)
- Czechoslovakia: Československé státní dráhy (ČSD)
- Yugoslavia: Jugoslovenske Železnice (JŽ)
- Italy: Ferrovie dello Stato (FS)
- Romania: Căile Ferate Române (CFR).

With the promulgation of the Austrian Federal Constitutional Law on 10 November 1920, the supervision of the national railway system passed to the newly established Ministry of Transport.

== See also ==
- List of locomotives and railbuses of the Imperial Royal Austrian State Railways
