= Paul Gautsch von Frankenthurn =

Austrian politician

Hochwohlgeboren Paul Gautsch Freiherr von Frankenthurn
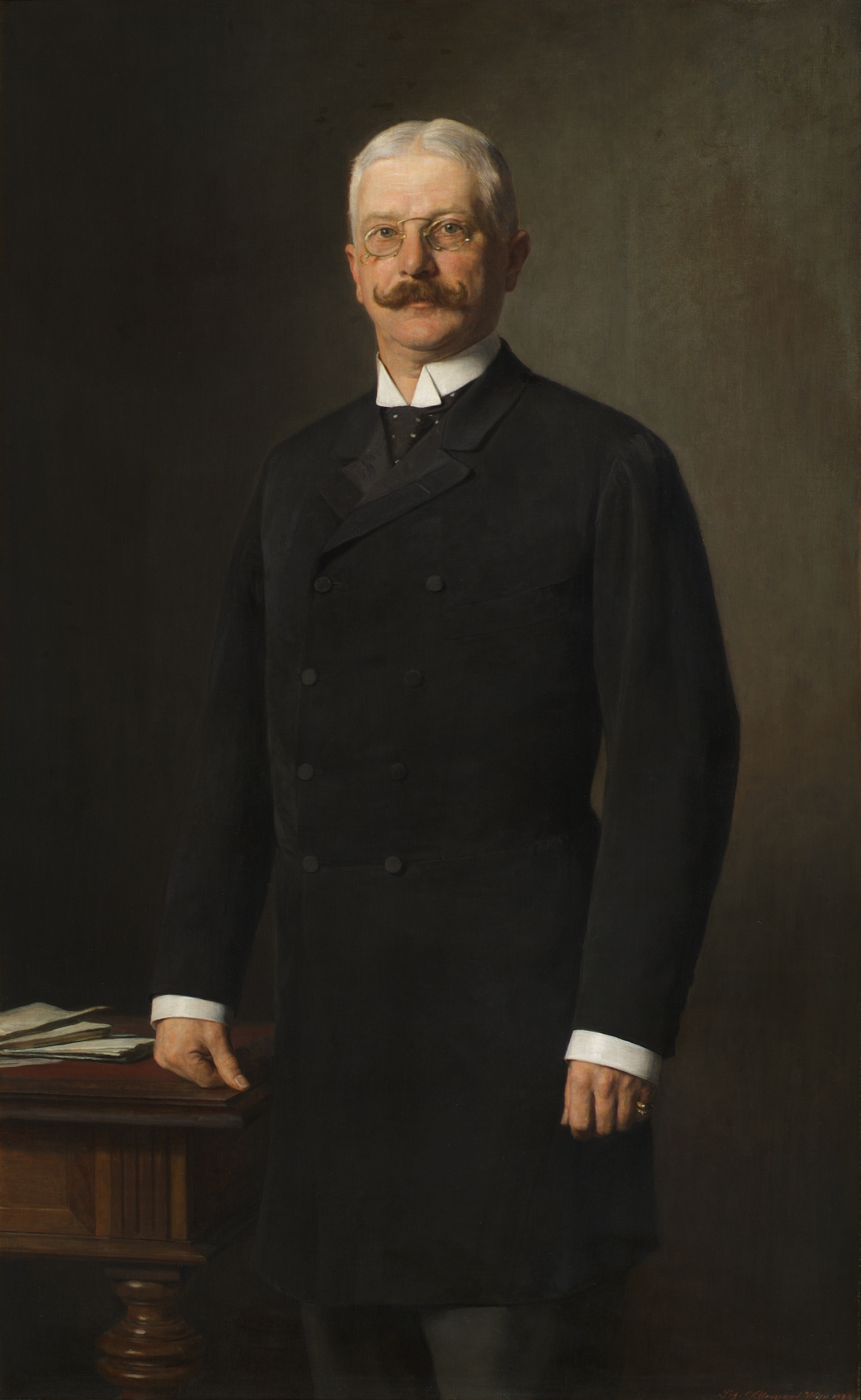
- Portrait by Siegmund L'Allemand, 1894

Minister-President of Austria
- In office 28 June 1911 – 3 November 1911
- Monarch: Franz Joseph I
- Preceded by: Richard von Bienerth-Schmerling
- Succeeded by: Karl von Stürgkh
- In office 31 December 1904 – 2 May 1906
- Monarch: Franz Joseph I
- Preceded by: Ernest von Koerber
- Succeeded by: Konrad von Hohenlohe-Schillingsfürst
- In office 28 November 1897 – 5 March 1898
- Monarch: Franz Joseph I
- Preceded by: Kasimir Felix Badeni
- Succeeded by: Franz Anton von Thun und Hohenstein

Personal details
- Born: 26 February 1851 Döbling, Austrian Empire
- Died: 20 April 1918 (aged 67) Vienna, Austria-Hungary
- Party: Christian Social Party

Paul Gautsch Freiherr von Frankenthurn (26 February 1851 – 20 April 1918) was an Austrian statesman who served three times as Minister-President of Cisleithania.

== Biography ==
Paul Gautsch was born in Döbling (a Vienna suburb incorporated in 1892), the son of a civil servant. He attended the elite Theresianum boarding school and, having obtained his Matura degree, went on to study law at the University of Vienna. Gautsch achieved the promotio sub auspiciis Praesidentis, the highest possible honor for the country's best students, and began his career as a government official in the Austrian Ministry of Education.

In 1881 Gautsch became head teacher of the Theresianum school. On 5 November 1885 Emperor Franz Joseph I appointed him Minister of Education in the second cabinet of Minister-President Eduard Taaffe, an office he held until the downfall of Taaffe's government in 1893. Ennobled to the rank of Freiherr in 1890, he again served as Minister of Education in the Cisleithanian government of Kasimir Felix Badeni from 1895 to 1897.

After Badeni's resignation amidst the national crisis of the German-Czech language conflict, Gautsch was appointed Minister-President on 30 November 1897. He delayed the convening of the Imperial Council parliament, declared a state of emergency in Prague, and largely ruled by emergency decrees. His attempts to resolve the conflict by attenuating the language ordinances made by Badeni finally failed and Gautsch resigned on 5 March 1898, after only three months in office. The Badeni ordinances were finally revoked under Minister-President Manfred von Clary-Aldringen in October 1899, nevertheless the language dispute remained insuperable.

After his resignation, Gautsch served as president of the Austrian supreme audit institution (Oberster Rechnungshof) until on 1 January 1905 he was again appointed Minister-President. However, his second term in office too did not last long; preparing the way for universal male suffrage he met with resistance in the Austrian parliament and again resigned 1 May 1906. It was Minister-President Max Wladimir von Beck who could implement the electoral reform in December.

Gautsch returned to the Court of Auditors, until he was named Minister-President for the third time on 28 June 1911, again in troubled times when upon the Cisleithanian legislative election the government of his predecessor Richard von Bienerth-Schmerling had lost its majority in parliament. After violent rioting in Vienna as a result of high prices in September followed by shots in parliament, Gautsch resigned his office on November 3. He was succeeded by Karl von Stürgkh, who held the office for almost five years, leading Austria-Hungary into World War I.

Gautsch remained politically active as a peer of the Austrian Herrenhaus and confidant of the Emperor. He died in Spring 1918, a few months before the dissolution of the Monarchy.

In 1908, the SS Baron Gautsch passenger ship of the Austrian Lloyd had been named in his honour; the vessel sank in the first days of the Great War on 13 August 1914, when it hit a mine field laid by the Austro-Hungarian Navy near the Istrian coast. 147 people lost their lives in the sinking.

== Private life ==
He was married to Elden Helene Schlumberger von Goldeck (1854–1909). They had one son and two daughters:

- Baroness Helene Gautsch von Frankenthurm (b. 1877); married Freiherr Rudolf Klein von Wisenberg (b. 1865)
- Baron Oskar Freiherr Gautsch von Frankenthurn (1879–1958); married to Countess Karola Friderika Maria Festetics von Tolna (1888—1951)
- Baroness Mathilde Gautsch von Frankenthurn (b. 1883); married to Count Alexander Maria Wenzel von Zedtwitz (1871–1940)

== Honours ==
- Austria-Hungary:
  - Knight of the Order of Franz Joseph, 1880
  - Knight of the Iron Crown, 1st Class, 1887
  - Grand Cross of the Imperial Order of Leopold, 1892; in Diamonds, 1898
  - Grand Cross of St. Stephen, 1906; in Diamonds, 1911
