= Count Richard von Bienerth-Schmerling =

Austrian statesman

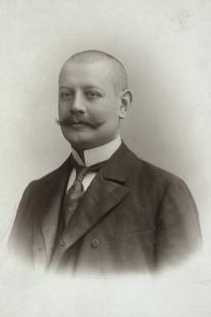
Count Richard von Bienerth-Schmerling.

Baron Richard von Bienerth, after 1915 Count von Bienerth-Schmerling (2 March 1863, in Verona, Austrian Empire – 3 June 1918, in Vienna), was an Austrian statesman.

He was the son of the Austrian Lieutenant-Field Marshal Karl von Bienerth (1825–1882) and a grandson on his mother's side of the Minister of State and later President of the High Court of Cassation Anton von Schmerling (1805−1893).

Richard Freiherr von Bienerth entered the service of the state in 1884 in the Styrian governorate, embarked on a civil servant's career after 1886 in the education ministry in Vienna, and from 1899 to 1905 was vice-president of the Lower Austrian school inspectorate. He took the reins of the education ministry on 11 September 1905 as section head in the cabinet of Paul Gautsch von Frankenthurn, a position he kept in the short-lived government of Prince Konrad of Hohenlohe-Waldenburg-Schillingsfürst. In the cabinet of Baron Max Wladimir von Beck he was minister for the interior from 2 June 1906 to 15 November 1908 and worked on the electoral reform project (the introduction of universal male suffrage) of 1907. After Beck's downfall, Emperor Franz Joseph I appointed Bienerth as prime minister, an office he held from 15 November 1908 to 28 June 1911. The government lost its parliamentary majority at the Reichsrat elections of June 1911, which brought heavy losses for the Christian Social Party and the Poland Club, and Bienerth resigned as prime minister. He was then appointed as governor of Lower Austria, succeeding Count Erich Kielmansegg. Despite suffering from an incurable disease, he remained in office until 28 November 1915. When he resigned as governor, the Emperor elevated him to the rank of Count.
