= Marchegg =

- Municipality
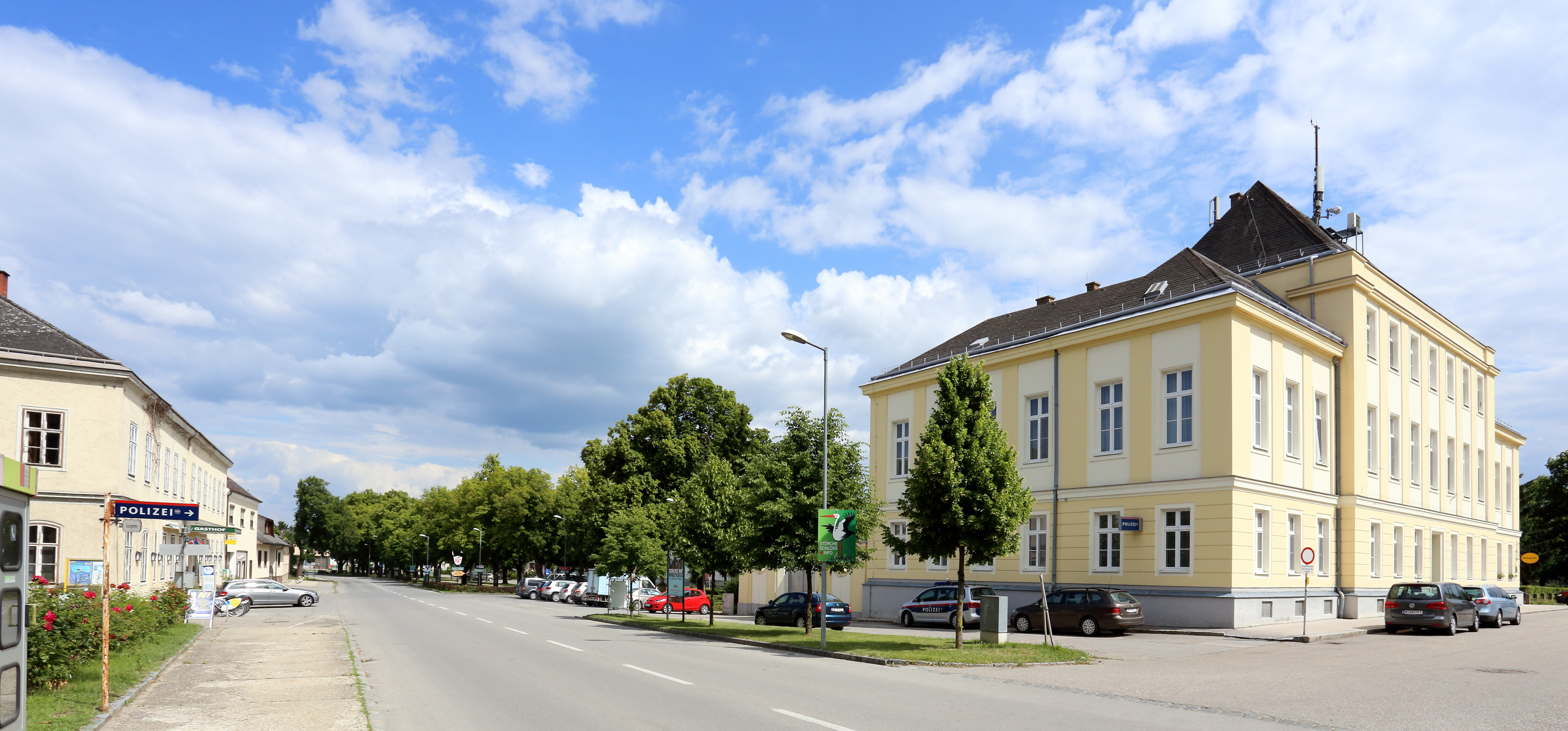
- Main square

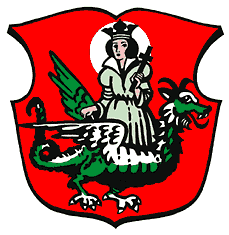
- Coat of arms

- Location within Austria
- Coordinates: 48°17′N 16°54′E
- Country: Austria
- State: Lower Austria
- District: Gänserndorf
- Founded: 1268
- Founder: Ottokar II of Bohemia

Government
  - Mayor: Gernot Haupt (Austrian politician)

Area
  - Total: 45.52 km^{2} (17.58 sq mi)
- Elevation: 143 m (469 ft)

Population (2018-01-01)
  - Total: 2,960
  - Density: 65.0/km^{2} (168/sq mi)
- Time zone: UTC+1 (CET)
  - Summer (DST): UTC+2 (CEST)
- Postal code: 2293
- Area code: 02285
- Website: www.marchegg.at

Marchegg (Austrian German: [marˈçɛɡ]; Czech: Marchek; Croatian: Muriek or Marhek; Slovak: Marchek) is a border town in the district of Gänserndorf in the state of Lower Austria in north-eastern Austria. it is situated on the Morava River on the border with Slovakia. The town is connected to Vysoká pri Morave via a bike bridge. The town was founded by King Ottokar II of Bohemia in 1268.

Local landmarks include the Baroque Marchegg Castle, the Gothic-Baroque Saint Margaret church, and partially preserved medieval town walls.

== Population ==
Historical population

| Year | Pop. | ±% |
|---|---|---|
| 1869 | 1,802 | — |
| 1880 | 2,066 | +14.7% |
| 1890 | 2,325 | +12.5% |
| 1900 | 2,745 | +18.1% |
| 1910 | 3,576 | +30.3% |

| Year | Pop. | ±% |
|---|---|---|
| 1923 | 3,448 | −3.6% |
| 1934 | 3,634 | +5.4% |
| 1939 | 3,434 | −5.5% |
| 1951 | 2,977 | −13.3% |
| 1961 | 2,733 | −8.2% |

| Year | Pop. | ±% |
|---|---|---|
| 1971 | 2,687 | −1.7% |
| 1981 | 2,641 | −1.7% |
| 1991 | 2,736 | +3.6% |
| 2001 | 2,950 | +7.8% |
| 2011 | 2,044 | −30.7% |

== Gallery ==
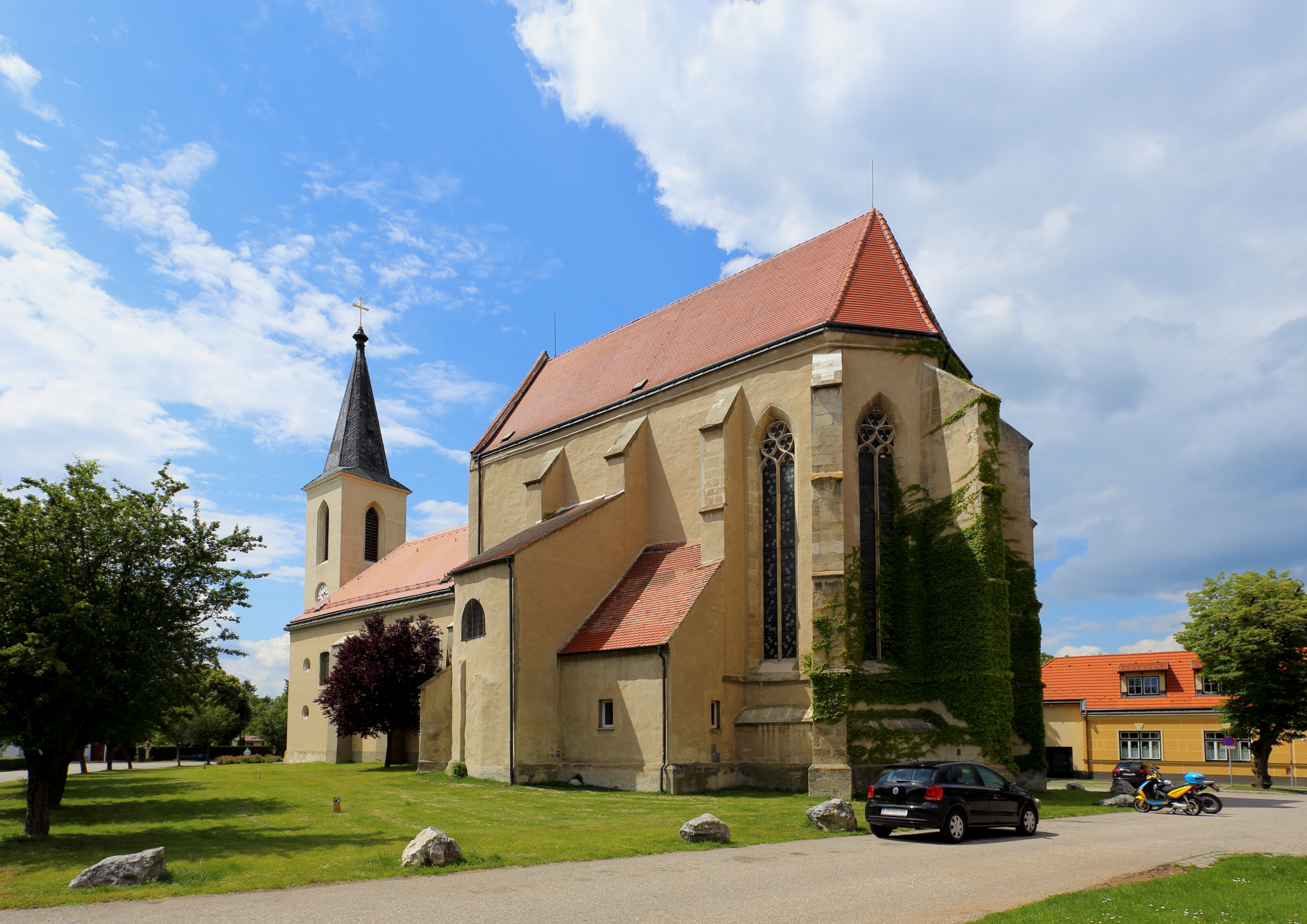
Parish church of St. Margaret of Antioch

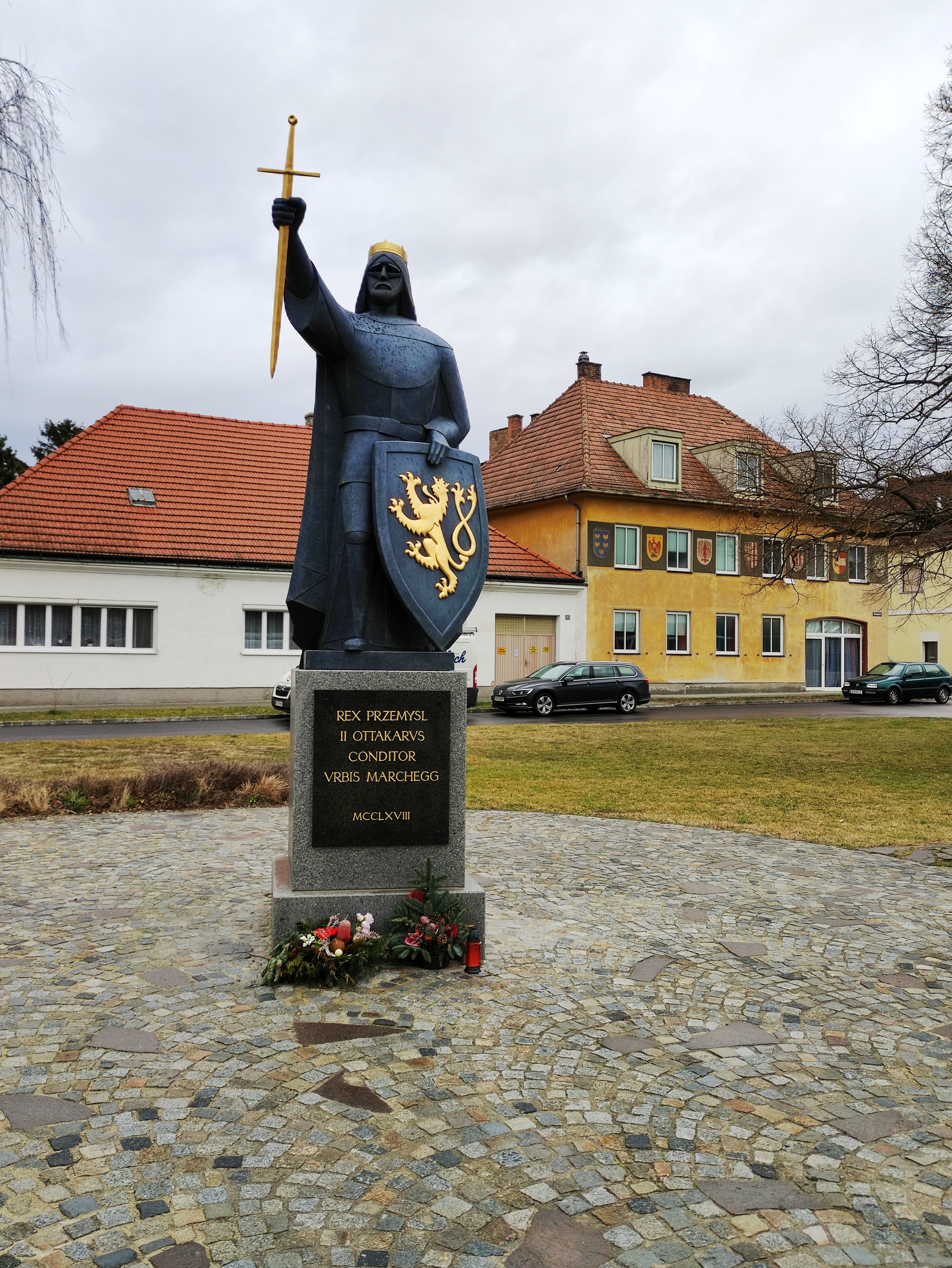
Statue of King Ottokar II of Bohemia, founder of the town

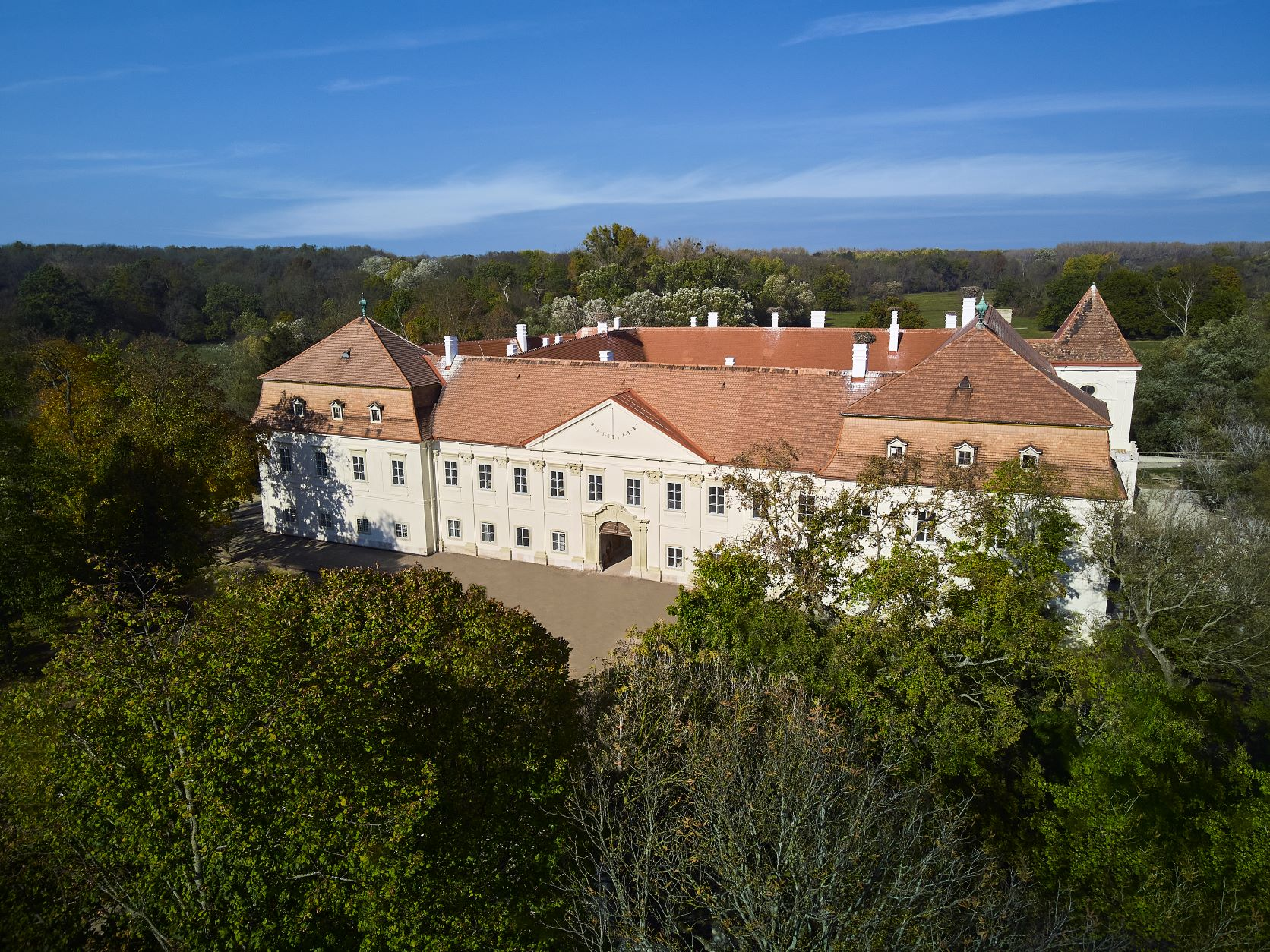
Castle

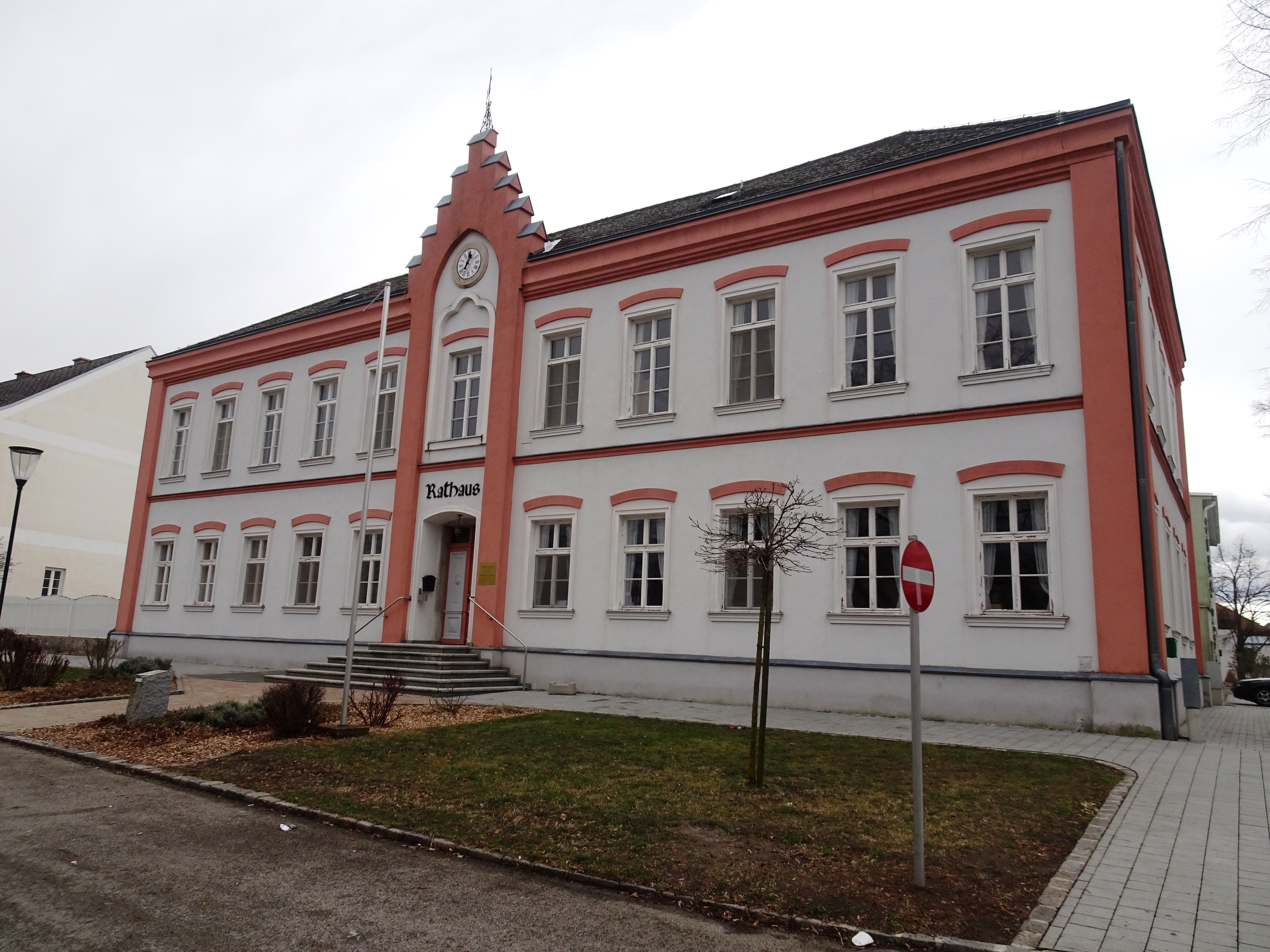
Town Hall
