= List of heads of government under Austrian emperors =

Imperial coat of arms of the Austrian Empire

This is a list of heads of government under Austrian emperors.

== State chancellors of the Archduchy of Austria (1527–1804) ==
From 1664/69 the Privy Conference (Geheime Konferenz), a committee of the Imperial Privy Council (Geheimer Rat), provided advice to Emperor Leopold I whereby the Austrian court chancellor, responsible for the Habsburg 'Hereditary Lands', served as rapporteur and thereby gained increasing influence. The Habsburg diplomatic service was re-organised, when Emperor Charles VI by resolution of 1720 declared Court Chancellor Philipp Ludwig Wenzel von Sinzendorf responsible for foreign policy issues. Upon Sinzendorf's death in February 1742, Archduchess Maria Theresa finally separated the central Habsburg State Chancellery responsible of Foreign Affairs from the domestic Austrian Court Chancellery.

- 1527 Leonhard Freiherr von Harrach
- 1528–1539 Bernhard von Cles
- 1539–1544 Dr. Georg Gienger
- 1544–1558 Dr. Jakob Jonas
- 1558–1563 Dr. Georg Sigmund Seid
- 1563–1577 Dr. Johann Baptist Weber
- 1577–1587 Dr. Sigmund Viehäuser
- 1587–1594 Dr. Jacob Kurz von Senftenau
- 1594–1597 Johann Wolf Freymann von Oberhausen
- 1597–1606 Dr. Rudolf Coradutz
- 1606–1612 Leopold Freiherr von Stralendorf
- 1612–1620 Hans Ludwig von Ulm
- 1620–1637 Johann Baptist Verda von Verdenberg
- 1637–1656 Johann Mathias Prücklmayer
- 1656–1665 Hans Joachim Sinzendorf
- 1667–1683 Johann Paul Hocher von Hohengran
- 1683–1693 Theodor von Strattman
- 1694–1705 Julius Friedrich Bucellini
- 1705–1715 Johann Friedrich von Seilern

Portrait	Name	Began	Ended
	Philipp Ludwig Wenzel Graf von Sinzendorf (1671–1742)	1715	8 February 1742
	Anton Corfiz Graf von Uhlfeld (1699–1769)	14 February 1742	13 May 1753
	Wenzel Anton Graf (from 1764, Fürst) von Kaunitz-Rietberg (1711–1794)	13 May 1753	19 August 1792
	Johann Philipp Graf von Cobenzl (1741–1810)	19 August 1792	27 March 1793
	Johann Amadeus Francis de Paula von Thugut (1736–1818)	27 March 1793	28 September 1800
	Ferdinand von Trauttmansdorff (1749–1827)	28 September 1800	11 August 1804

== Francis I (1804–1835) ==
Portrait	Name (Birth–Death)	Post	Term of office		Political party
	Ludwig von Cobenzl (1753–1809)	State Chancellors of the Habsburg Monarchy	11 August 1804	25 December 1805	Nonpartisan
	Johann Philipp Stadion, Count von Warthausen (1763–1824)	State Chancellors of the Habsburg Monarchy	25 December 1805	4 October 1809	Nonpartisan
	Klemens von Metternich (1773–1859)	State Chancellor of the Austrian Empire	8 October 1809	25 May 1821	Nonpartisan
	Klemens von Metternich (1773–1859)	State Chancellor of the Austrian Empire	25 May 1821	13 March 1848	Nonpartisan

== Ferdinand I (1835–1848) ==
Portrait	Name (Birth–Death)	Post	Term of office		Political party
	Prince Klemens von Metternich (1773–1859)	State Chancellor of the Austrian Empire	8 October 1809	25 May 1821	Nonpartisan
	Prince Klemens von Metternich (1773–1859)	State Chancellor of the Austrian Empire	25 May 1821	13 March 1848	Nonpartisan
	Count Franz Anton von Kolowrat-Liebsteinsky (1778–1861)	Minister-President of the Austrian Empire	20 March 1848	19 April 1848	Nonpartisan
	Charles-Louis, Count of Ficquelmont (1777–1857)	Minister-President of the Austrian Empire	19 April 1848	4 May 1848	Nonpartisan
	Baron Franz von Pillersdorf (1786–1862)	Minister-President of the Austrian Empire	4 May 1848	8 July 1848	Nonpartisan
	Baron Anton von Doblhoff-Dier (1800–1872)	Minister-President of the Austrian Empire	8 July 1848	18 July 1848	Nonpartisan
	Baron Johann von Wessenberg-Ampringen (1773–1858)	Minister-President of the Austrian Empire	18 July 1848	21 November 1848	Nonpartisan
	Prince Felix of Schwarzenberg (1800–1852)	Minister-President of the Austrian Empire	21 November 1848	5 April 1852	Nonpartisan

== Franz Joseph I (1848–1916) ==
This is a list of heads of government under Emperor Franz Joseph I of Austria. Franz Joseph was born on 18 August 1830 and died on 21 November 1916, his imperial reign lasted from 2 December 1848 to 21 November 1916. His predecessor was Ferdinand I & V and his successor was Charles I & IV.

Franz Joseph ruled over the Austrian Empire which had a minister-president and later a chairman of the Ministers' Conference as head of government. After the Austro-Hungarian Compromise of 1867 the joint monarchy of Austria-Hungary had their own heads of government: the minister-president of Cisleithania for Cisleithania (the Austrian part of the empire) and the prime minister of the Kingdom of Hungary for Transleithania (the Hungarian part of the empire).

One minister-president of the Austrian Empire, six chairmen of the Ministers' Conference of the Austrian Empire, twenty-two minister-presidents of Cisleithania and fourteen prime ministers of the Kingdom of Hungary have served under the reign of Emperor Franz Joseph I.

=== Austrian Empire ===
Portrait	Name (Birth–Death)	Post	Term of office		Political party
	Prince Felix of Schwarzenberg (1800–1852)	Minister-President of the Austrian Empire	21 November 1848	5 April 1852	Nonpartisan
	Count Karl Ferdinand von Buol (1797–1865)	Chairman of the Ministers' Conference of the Austrian Empire	11 April 1852	21 August 1859	Nonpartisan
	Count Bernhard von Rechberg (1806–1899)	Chairman of the Ministers' Conference of the Austrian Empire	21 August 1859	4 February 1861	Nonpartisan
	Archduke Rainer Ferdinand of Austria (1827–1913)	Chairman of the Ministers' Conference of the Austrian Empire	4 February 1861	26 June 1865	Nonpartisan
	Count Alexander de Mensdorff-Pouilly (1813–1871)	Chairman of the Ministers' Conference of the Austrian Empire	26 June 1865	27 July 1865	Nonpartisan
	Count Richard Belcredi (1823–1902)	Chairman of the Ministers' Conference of the Austrian Empire	27 July 1865	7 February 1867	Nonpartisan
	Count Friedrich Ferdinand von Beust (1809–1886)	Chairman of the Ministers' Conference of the Austrian Empire	7 February 1867	30 December 1867	Nonpartisan

=== Chairmen of the Ministers' Council for Common Affairs ===
Portrait	Name (Birth–Death)	Post	Term of office		Political party
	Count Friedrich Ferdinand von Beust (1809–1886)	Chairman of the Ministers' Council for Common Affairs	30 December 1867	8 November 1871	Nonpartisan
	Count Gyula Andrássy de Csíkszentkirály et Krasznahorka (1823–1890)	Chairman of the Ministers' Council for Common Affairs	14 November 1871	8 October 1879	Nonpartisan
	Baron Heinrich Karl von Haymerle (1828–1881)	Chairman of the Ministers' Council for Common Affairs	8 October 1879	10 October 1881	Nonpartisan
	Count Gustav Kálnoky de Köröspatak (1832–1898)	Chairman of the Ministers' Council for Common Affairs	20 November 1881	2 May 1895	Nonpartisan
	Count Agenor Maria Gołuchowski (1849–1921)	Chairman of the Ministers' Council for Common Affairs	16 May 1895	24 October 1906	Nonpartisan
	Count Alois Lexa von Aehrenthal (1854–1912)	Chairman of the Ministers' Council for Common Affairs	24 October 1906	17 February 1912	Nonpartisan
	Count Leopold Berchtold (1863–1942)	Chairman of the Ministers' Council for Common Affairs	17 February 1912	13 January 1915	Nonpartisan
	Count Stephan Burián von Rajecz (1851–1922)	Chairman of the Ministers' Council for Common Affairs	13 January 1915	22 December 1916	Nonpartisan

==== Cisleithania ====
Portrait	Name (Birth–Death)	Post	Term of office		Political party
	Prince Karl of Auersperg (1814–1890)	Minister-President of Cisleithania	30 December 1867	24 September 1868	Constitutional Party
	Eduard Taaffe, 11th Viscount Taaffe (1833–1895)	Minister-President of Cisleithania	24 September 1868	15 January 1870	Constitutional Party
	Baron Ignaz von Plener (1810–1908)	Minister-President of Cisleithania	15 January 1870	1 February 1870	Constitutional Party
	Leopold Hasner von Artha (1818–1891)	Minister-President of Cisleithania	1 February 1870	12 April 1870	Constitutional Party
	Alfred Józef Potocki (1817–1889)	Minister-President of Cisleithania	12 April 1870	6 February 1871	Federalist Party
	Count Karl Sigmund von Hohenwart (1824–1899)	Minister-President of Cisleithania	6 February 1871	30 October 1871	Federalist Party
	Ludwig Freiherr von Holzgethan (1800–1876)	Minister-President of Cisleithania	30 October 1871	25 November 1871	Nonpartisan
	Prince Adolf of Auersperg (1821–1885)	Minister-President of Cisleithania	25 November 1871	15 February 1879	Constitutional Party
	Karl Ritter von Stremayr (1823–1904)	Minister-President of Cisleithania	15 February 1879	12 August 1879	Constitutional Party
	Eduard Taaffe, 11th Viscount Taaffe (1833–1895)	Minister-President of Cisleithania	12 August 1879	11 November 1893	Constitutional Party
	Alfred III, Prince of Windisch-Grätz (1851–1927)	Minister-President of Cisleithania	11 November 1893	19 June 1895	Federalist Party
	Count Erich Kielmansegg (1847–1923)	Minister-President of Cisleithania	19 June 1895	30 September 1895	Federalist Party
	Count Kazimierz Feliks Badeni (1846–1909)	Minister-President of Cisleithania	30 September 1895	30 November 1897	Federalist Party
	Paul Gautsch von Frankenthurn (1851–1918)	Minister-President of Cisleithania	30 November 1897	5 March 1898	Christian Social Party
	Franz, Prince of Thun and Hohenstein (1847–1916)	Minister-President of Cisleithania	5 March 1898	2 October 1899	Federalist Party
	Count Manfred von Clary-Aldringen (1852–1928)	Minister-President of Cisleithania	2 October 1899	21 December 1899	Nonpartisan
	Heinrich Ritter von Wittek (1844–1930)	Minister-President of Cisleithania	21 December 1899	18 January 1900	Christian Social Party
	Ernest von Koerber (1850–1919)	Minister-President of Cisleithania	18 January 1900	31 December 1904	(Old) Constitutional Party
	Paul Gautsch von Frankenthurn (1851–1918)	Minister-President of Cisleithania	1 January 1904	2 May 1906	Christian Social Party
	Prince Konrad of Hohenlohe-Schillingsfürst (1863–1918)	Minister-President of Cisleithania	2 May 1906	2 June 1906	Nonpartisan
	Baron Max Wladimir von Beck (1854–1943)	Minister-President of Cisleithania	2 June 1906	15 November 1908	Nonpartisan
	Count Richard von Bienerth-Schmerling (1863–1918)	Minister-President of Cisleithania	15 November 1908	28 June 1911	Nonpartisan
	Paul Gautsch von Frankenthurn (1851–1918)	Minister-President of Cisleithania	28 June 1911	3 November 1911	Christian Social Party
	Karl von Stürgkh (1859–1916)	Minister-President of Cisleithania	3 November 1911	21 October 1916	Nonpartisan (German National Association)
	Ernest von Koerber (1850–1919)	Minister-President of Cisleithania	21 October 1916	20 December 1916	(Old) Constitutional Party (German National Association)

==== Transleithania ====
Picture	Name (Birth–Death)	Post	Term of Office		Political party
	Gyula Andrássy (1823–1890)	Prime Minister of the Kingdom of Hungary	17 February 1867	14 November 1871	Deák Party
	Menyhért Lónyay (1822–1884)	Prime Minister of the Kingdom of Hungary	14 November 1871	4 December 1872	Deák Party
	József Szlávy (1818–1900)	Prime Minister of the Kingdom of Hungary	4 December 1872	21 March 1874	Deák Party
	István Bittó (1822–1903)	Prime Minister of the Kingdom of Hungary	21 March 1874	2 March 1875	Deák Party
	Béla Wenckheim (1811–1879)	Prime Minister of the Kingdom of Hungary	2 March 1875	20 October 1875	Liberal Party
	Kálmán Tisza (1830–1902)	Prime Minister of the Kingdom of Hungary	20 October 1875	13 March 1890	Liberal Party
	Gyula Szapáry (1832–1905)	Prime Minister of the Kingdom of Hungary	13 March 1890	17 November 1892	Liberal Party
	Sándor Wekerle (1848–1921); 1st term	Prime Minister of the Kingdom of Hungary	17 November 1892	14 January 1895	Liberal Party
	Dezső Bánffy (1843–1911)	Prime Minister of the Kingdom of Hungary	14 January 1895	26 February 1899	Liberal Party
	Kálmán Széll (1843–1915)	Prime Minister of the Kingdom of Hungary	26 February 1899	27 June 1903	Liberal Party
	Károly Khuen-Héderváry (1849–1918); 1st term	Prime Minister of the Kingdom of Hungary	27 June 1903	3 November 1903	Liberal Party
	István Tisza (1861–1918); 1st term	Prime Minister of the Kingdom of Hungary	3 November 1903	18 June 1905	Liberal Party
	Géza Fejérváry (1833–1914)	Prime Minister of the Kingdom of Hungary	18 June 1905	8 April 1906	Independent
	Sándor Wekerle (1848–1921); 2nd term	Prime Minister of the Kingdom of Hungary	8 April 1906	17 January 1910	National Constitution Party
	Károly Khuen-Héderváry (1849–1918); 2nd term	Prime Minister of the Kingdom of Hungary	17 January 1910	22 April 1912	National Party of Work
	László Lukács (1850–1932)	Prime Minister of the Kingdom of Hungary	22 April 1912	10 June 1913	National Party of Work
	István Tisza (1861–1918); 2nd term	Prime Minister of the Kingdom of Hungary	10 June 1913	15 June 1917	National Party of Work

== Charles I & IV (1916–1918) ==
This is a list of heads of government under Emperor Charles I of Austria. Charles was born on 17 August 1887 and died on 1 April 1922, his imperial reign lasted from 21 November 1916 to 11 November 1918. His predecessor was Franz Joseph I. Since the Austro-Hungarian Empire dissolved and the monarchy abolished on 11 November 1918 Charles was the last Austrian emperor and thus not succeeded.

Five minister-presidents of Cisleithania and five prime ministers of the Kingdom of Hungary have served under the reign of Emperor Charles I.

=== Chairmen of the Ministers' Council for Common Affairs ===
Portrait	Name (Birth–Death)	Post	Term of office		Political party
	Count Stephan Burián von Rajecz (1851–1922)	Chairman of the Ministers' Council for Common Affairs	13 January 1915	22 December 1916	Nonpartisan
	Count Ottokar Czernin von und zu Chudenitz (1872–1932)	Chairman of the Ministers' Council for Common Affairs	22 December 1916	16 April 1918	Nonpartisan
	Count Stephan Burián von Rajecz (1851–1922)	Chairman of the Ministers' Council for Common Affairs	16 April 1918	24 October 1918	Nonpartisan
	Count Gyula Andrássy de Csíkszentkirály et Krasznahorka (the Younger) (1860–1929)	Chairman of the Ministers' Council for Common Affairs	24 October 1918	2 November 1918	Nonpartisan

==== Cisleithania ====
Portrait	Name (Birth–Death)	Post	Term of office		Political party
	Ernest von Koerber (1850–1919)	Minister-President of Cisleithania	21 October 1916	20 December 1916	(Old) Constitutional Party (German National Association)
	Heinrich Clam-Martinic (1863–1932)	Minister-President of Cisleithania	20 December 1916	23 June 1917	Nonpartisan (German National Association)
	Ernst Seidler von Feuchtenegg (1862–1931)	Minister-President of Cisleithania	23 June 1917	27 July 1918	Nonpartisan
	Baron Max Hussarek von Heinlein (1865–1935)	Minister-President of Cisleithania	27 July 1918	27 October 1918	Christian Social Party
	Heinrich Lammasch (1853–1920)	Minister-President of Cisleithania	27 October 1918	11 November 1918	Christian Social Party

==== Transleithania ====
Picture	Name (Birth–Death)	Post	Term of Office		Political party
	István Tisza (1861–1918); 2nd term	Prime Minister of the Kingdom of Hungary	10 June 1913	15 June 1917	National Party of Work
	Móric Esterházy (1881–1960)	Prime Minister of the Kingdom of Hungary	15 June 1917	20 August 1917	Independent
	Sándor Wekerle (1848–1921); 3rd term	Prime Minister of the Kingdom of Hungary	20 August 1917	30 October 1918	National Constitution Party → '48 Constitution Party
	János Hadik (1863–1933)	Prime Minister of the Kingdom of Hungary	30 October 1918	31 October 1918	National Constitution Party
	Mihály Károlyi (1875–1955)	Prime Minister of the Kingdom of Hungary	31 October 1918	16 November 1918	F48P–Károlyi

== See also ==
- Austria-Hungary
- Imperial Council
- Diet of Hungary
