= Fundamental Articles of 1871 =

Proposed but never-adopted legislation in Austria-Hungary

The Fundamental Articles of 1871 (German: Fundamentalartikel, Czech: Fundamentálky) were a set of proposed changes to the Austro-Hungarian constitution regarding the status of the Bohemian Crownlands. Their rejection was largely responsible for the downfall of the Hohenwart cabinet.

== Background ==
The Austro-Hungarian Compromise of 1867 put an end to the 18-year-long military dictatorship and absolutist rule over Hungary and elevated relations to a Dual Monarchy. However it left other significant non-German-speaking groups, most notably the Czechs, under the authority of the Austrian portion of the Empire. Other nationalities had protested the terms of the constitution, and by early 1870, non-German Liberals had quit the parliament. In the interest of a reconciliation with the minorities, the Emperor appointed Alfred Potocki as his Prime Minister.

Potocki was able to gain support for the constitution from the Poles, Slovenes, and Rumanians, but the Czechs remained obstinate. However, Prussian victory over France in the War of 1871 and the unification of the South German states with Prussia caused great Imperial mistrust of Potocki's largely German-Liberal cabinet. Thus, in February 1871, Potocki was replaced by Count Hohenwart, who represented a more anti-Liberal Federalist interest. Hohenwart appointed Albert Schäffle as his commerce minister. Schäffle's vision, however, extended far beyond his title, and he embarked on a sweeping program to reorganize the Austrian lands and reconcile the Czechs to the constitution. This program culminated in a series of proposed changes to the Austrian constitution that were ratified by the Bohemian Diet, the "Fundamental Articles".

== Terms ==
Though the Articles included at least a superficial recognition of the 1867 constitution, they would have radically altered the basic structure of the Austro-Hungarian political entity, and the position of the Czech lands within it. The Czech crownlands of Moravia and Austrian Silesia would have given up significant authority to the larger Bohemia. The Bohemian Diet, then, would no longer report to the Austrian Parliament, and would only have been required to send representatives to a congress of all the Austrian crownlands, which had little overarching authority. Ultimately, Bohemia would have gained autonomy and independence very similar to what Hungary had achieved in the Ausgleich.

== Reception ==
Except among the Czech nationalists and their allies among the conservative Bohemian aristocrats, response to the Articles was almost universally and resoundingly negative. The alterations were supposed to be ratified by a combined Diet for all three Czech crownlands, but the Moravian Diet agreed only conditionally, and the Silesian Diet flatly rejected any measures that involved its loss of authority to a general Diet.

Simultaneously, staunch Magyar opposition, led by Hungarian Prime Minister Gyula Andrássy may have also contributed to the Fundamental Articles' ultimate rejection. Since the Articles meant the reorganization of the Cisleithanian portion of the Empire based on Federalism for the Nationalities, it was feared that they might cause demands for similar concessions to non-Magyar groups under Hungarian authority and undermine the 1867 constitution. However, Schäffle could hardly have been ignorant of this effect, and may have intended to use the Articles to force the Hungarians into accepting a reorganization of the Empire.

Potentially the most damaging element of the backlash, however, was the response of Austria's largely Liberal German population. While the unification of Germany and opposition to Austria's many pro-unification Germans had been a reason to support the Hohenwart-Schäffle program, it quickly became a reason to oppose it. Franz Josef's Foreign Minister Beust, feared the power of Austria's new German neighbor, having witnessed its crushing defeat of France. Beust cooperated with Andrássy, and advised the Emperor against accepting the Articles. In addition, Bismarck and Wilhelm I of Germany themselves made clear to Franz Josef their displeasure over the marginalization of Austria's Germans.

== Aftermath ==
In the end, the Fundamental Articles, despite Bohemian acceptance and wavering support from the Moravian Diet, were doomed to failure. Faced with mounting internal and external backlash, Emperor Franz Josef rejected the measures on 20 October 1871. Hohenwart and his cabinet, including Schäffle, were shuffled out of office shortly thereafter. Beust himself was forced out soon after, to be replaced by Andrássy, making the whole series of events a political coup for the Hungarian statesman. The failure of the Fundamental Articles marked the end of old-order Czech Federal aspirations within the Empire, and served to bring Austria-Hungary as a whole under the further influence of a strong Germany.
