= 1897 Cisleithanian legislative election =

Austro-Hungarian imperial council election

1897 Cisleithanian Imperial Council election
- March 1897

All 425 seats in the Imperial Council 213 seats needed for a majority
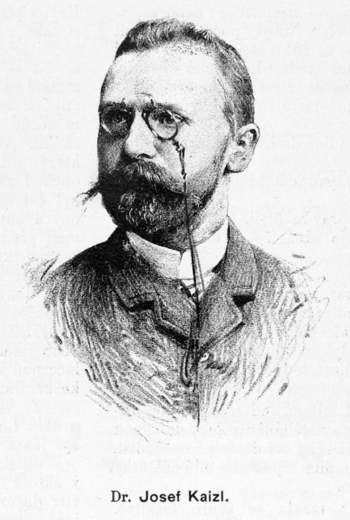

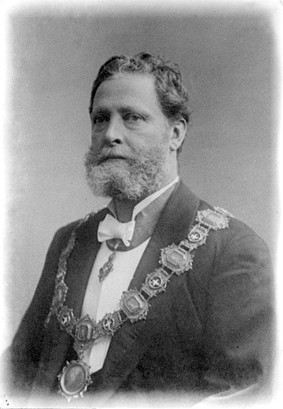

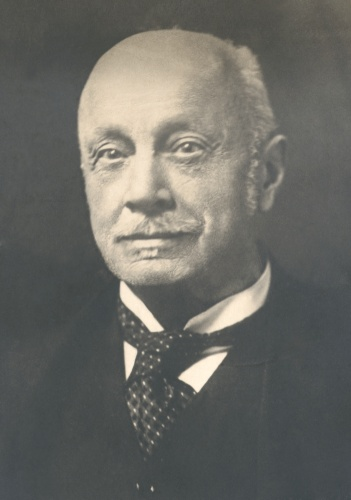

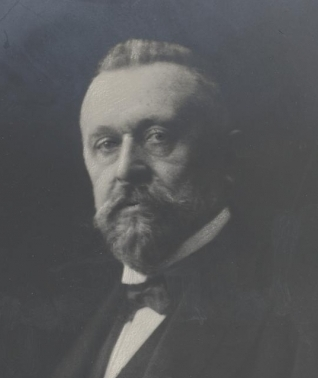
| | First party | Second party | Third party |
|---|---|---|---|
| Leader | Josef Kaizl |
| Party | NSS | DLVP | PKK |
| Alliance | Bohemian Club | German Progressive Parties | Poland Club |
| Last election | 9.15% | 32.81% | 11.62% |
| Seats won | 53 | 50 | 46 |
| Popular vote | 64,546 | 81,291 | 26,161 |
| Percentage | 6.09% | 7.79% | 2.46% |
| Swing | ▼3.06pp | ▼25.02pp | ▼9.16pp |
| | Fourth party | Fifth party | Sixth party |
| Leader | Karl Lueger | Otto Steinwender | Josef Maria Baernreither |
| Party | CS | DVP | VSGGB |
| Alliance | Christian Social Union | Association of German People's Parties | Union of Constitutionalist Landowners |
| Last election | 12.60% | New | 0.78% |
| Seats won | 39 | 31 | 23 |
| Popular vote | 372,395 | 48,000 | 2,288 |
| Percentage | 35.15% | 4.53% | 0.23% |
| Swing | ▲22.55pp | ▲4.53pp | ▼0.55pp |
Minister-President of Cisleithania before election
Kasimir Felix Badeni
FP
Elected Minister-President of Cisleithania
Kasimir Felix Badeni
FP

Legislative elections to elect the members of the ninth Imperial Council were held in March 1897 in Cisleithania, the northern and western ("Austrian") crown lands of Austria-Hungary. These elections were first in Cisleithania held under the curial system with universal, but still not equal, suffrage.

== Badeni electoral reform ==
Count Kasimir Felix Badeni had led the Cisleithanian government since 1895. In February 1896, the government submitted a proposal for fundamental reform of the electoral system. The so-called Badeni electoral reform kept the curial electoral system, but in addition to four existing curiae (landowners, trade and industry chambers, large and medium farmers, and male city residents who were annually paying at least 10 guilders of taxes), the fifth, general curia, was added. While voting rights were limited in the four original curiae (fiscally defined, therefore, allowing voting to only those who have paid taxes on prescribed minimum amount), the fifth curia included all men older than 24. In May 1896, Badeni electoral reform was approved by the Imperial Council.

== Results ==
Voting took place in several stages during March 1897, with the last elections being held in the fifth curia on March 12, 1897.

The elections significantly changed relations in the Imperial Council, with a strong trend in the degradation of the original dominant German Progressive Party being set. This trend went in favor of the newly founded German People's Party and the Christian Social Party. The elections also brought a further fragmentation of the political scene; the three strongest parliamentary clubs (Young Czechs, Polish Club, and German Progressive Party) had only 168 seats, and the new Imperial Council had 17 parliamentary clubs. Meanwhile, the Social Democrats were still weakening, winning only 15 seats.

| Party | Votes | % | Seats |
Croatian Nation
| Croatian National Party | 4,832 | 0.46 | 8 |
| Croatian Radical Party | 419 | 0.04 | 3 |
Czech Nation
| Young Czech Party | 64,546 | 6.09 | 53 |
| Old Czech Party | 22,769 | 2.15 | 0 |
| Czech Compromise Candidates | 4,176 | 0.39 | 4 |
| Czech People's Party (Young Czech) | 2,565 | 0.24 | 3 |
| Bohemian Conservative Party | 2,396 | 0.23 | 1 |
| National Czech Party | 1,883 | 0.18 | 0 |
German Nation
| Christian Social and Anti-Semitic Party | 372,395 | 35.15 | 39 |
| Social Democratic Party | 245,001 | 23.13 | 14 |
| German Liberal and Constitutional Party | 81,291 | 7.67 | 50 |
| German People's Party | 48,000 | 4.53 | 31 |
| German-National Party | 46,025 | 4.34 | 12 |
| Social Politicians | 7,874 | 0.74 | 1 |
| German Clerical and Conservative Party | 6,020 | 0.57 | 14 |
| Catholic Conservative Party | 4,475 | 0.42 | 14 |
| German Clerical Party | 2,140 | 0.20 | 2 |
| Catholic People’s Party | 1,897 | 0.18 | 5 |
| German Compromise Candidates | 1,548 | 0.15 | 1 |
| Officials' Party | 1,207 | 0.11 | 1 |
| German Farmers' Party | 1,157 | 0.11 | 0 |
| Agrarian Party | 642 | 0.06 | 1 |
| German Independents | 541 | 0.05 | 0 |
Italian Nation
| Italian Liberal Party | 25,312 | 2.39 | 14 |
| Autonomist Party | 1,465 | 0.14 | 0 |
| Italian Clerical Party | 1,098 | 0.10 | 4 |
| Italian Conservative Party | 916 | 0.09 | 1 |
Landowner Candidates
| Constitutionalist Landowners | 2,288 | 0.22 | 23 |
| Conservative Landowners | 1,089 | 0.10 | 9 |
| Bohemian Conservative Landowners | 689 | 0.07 | 19 |
| Bohemian Centre Party–Moravian Centre Party | 346 | 0.03 | 3 |
Polish Nation
| Polish Conservative Party | 26,161 | 2.47 | 46 |
| Polish Radical Party | 10,610 | 1.00 | 1 |
| Polish Liberal Party | 8,792 | 0.83 | 5 |
| Polish Democratic Party | 8,509 | 0.80 | 6 |
| Polish People's Party | 6,077 | 0.57 | 3 |
| Polish Clerical Party | 698 | 0.07 | 1 |
Romanian Nation
| Romanian National Party | 1,550 | 0.15 | 5 |
Ruthenian Nation
| Ruthenian Radical Party | 6,020 | 0.57 | 1 |
| Young Ruthenian Party | 1,816 | 0.17 | 6 |
| Ruthenian Moderate Party | 1,774 | 0.17 | 3 |
| Ruthenian Radical People’s Party | 927 | 0.09 | 0 |
| Ruthenian Party | 473 | 0.04 | 0 |
| Conservative Ruthenian Party | 428 | 0.04 | 0 |
| Old Ruthenian Party | 366 | 0.03 | 1 |
| Russophilic Party | 287 | 0.03 | 0 |
Serbian Nation
| Serb People's Party | 183 | 0.02 | 2 |
Slovenian Nation
| Slovenian National Party | 9,386 | 0.89 | 2 |
| Slovenian Liberal Party | 2,278 | 0.22 | 3 |
| Slovenian Clerical Party | 1,984 | 0.19 | 8 |
| Slovenian Conservative Party | 554 | 0.05 | 2 |
| Young Slovenian Party | 262 | 0.02 | 0 |
| Slovenian Radical Party | 122 | 0.01 | 0 |
Other
| Unknown votes | 5,130 | 0.48 | – |
| Split votes | 7,930 | 0.75 | – |
| Total | 1,059,319 | 100.00 | 425 |
Source: ANNO

=== Seats ===
In May 1897 the Imperial Council had 16 political groups and individual parties:

| Grouping | Seats |
|---|---|
| Bohemian Club | 60 |
| Poland Club | 59 |
| Association of German People's Parties | 41 |
| Slavic Christian-National Association | 35 |
| German Progressive Parties | 33 |
| Club of Catholic People's Parties | 31 |
| Union of Constitutional Landowners | 30 |
| Christian Social Union | 26 |
| Group of Bohemian Conservative Landowners | 19 |
| Italian Union | 19 |
| Social Democratic Association | 15 |
| Free German Union | 15 |
| Center Club | 6 |
| Polish Christian People's Parties | 6 |
| Romanian Club | 5 |
| Schönerer's group | 5 |
| Polish People's Party | 3 |
| Independents | 17 |
| Total | 425 |

== Aftermath ==
After the elections, Badeni tried to negotiate with the aim of creating a stable pro-government parliamentary majority. However, he did not consider the German Progressive Party or the radical nationalist Pan-German League, but preferred to try to gain support among conservative German-Austrian politicians, including the liberal German Constitutional Party. After the German Constitutional Party refused to give support to the minority government, Badeni announced on April 2, 1897, that his government would resign, but did not go through with the resignation. Meanwhile, negotiations on forming a government continued. On April 4, a framework agreement was set, effectively restoring the conservative so-called Iron Circle from the 1880s, which consisted of the German Catholic People's Party, the Young Czech Party, the Polish club and the Czech Party of Conservative Landowners. Badeni remained Prime Minister. However, the government did not last long as Badeni resigned on November 28, 1897, under the pressure from the German nationalists over the language regulations.
