= Marie Koupal Lusk =

American painter

- Born: Marie Koupalová; February 12, 1862; Češnovice (part of Pištín), Bohemia, Austrian Empire
- Died: December 13, 1929 (aged 67); Wilmette, Illinois, U.S.
- Education: Academy Colarossi; Art Students League of New York; National Academy of Design; School of the Art Institute of Chicago
- Known for: Painting
- Spouse: Charles D. Lusk (m. 1884)
- Children: Milan Lusk Famed violinist, George Lusk artist

Marie Koupal Lusk (née Koupalová; February 12, 1862 – December 13, 1929) was an American painter and one of the founders of the Chicago Palette Club.

== Biography ==
Marie Koupalová was born on February 12, 1862, at Češnovice house no 12, Bohemia, Austrian Empire and was baptized a Roman Catholic in Pištín. Her family immigrated to the United States in 1867, settling in Illinois. Lusk attended the School of the Art Institute of Chicago, the National Academy of Design, and the Art Students League of New York. She traveled to Paris where she studied under Václav Brožík at the Academy Colarossi.

On August 20, 1884, Koupal married Charles D. Lusk (1856–1935) in Chicago, a native of Veselí nad Lužnicí who became an attourney. Their son, Milan Lusk (1893-1932), was a well-regarded concert violinist. Lusk was involved with the Bohemian Club of Chicago She and her friend Alice Kellogg Tyler established the Palette Club, an art association for Chicago women.

Lusk exhibited her paintings at the Paris Salon, and the Art Institute of Chicago. She also exhibited her work at the Illinois Building at the 1893 World's Columbian Exposition in Chicago, Illinois. She painted the frieze "Music" for the reception room.

Lusk died on December 13, 1929, aged 67, in Wilmette, Illinois.

== Gallery ==
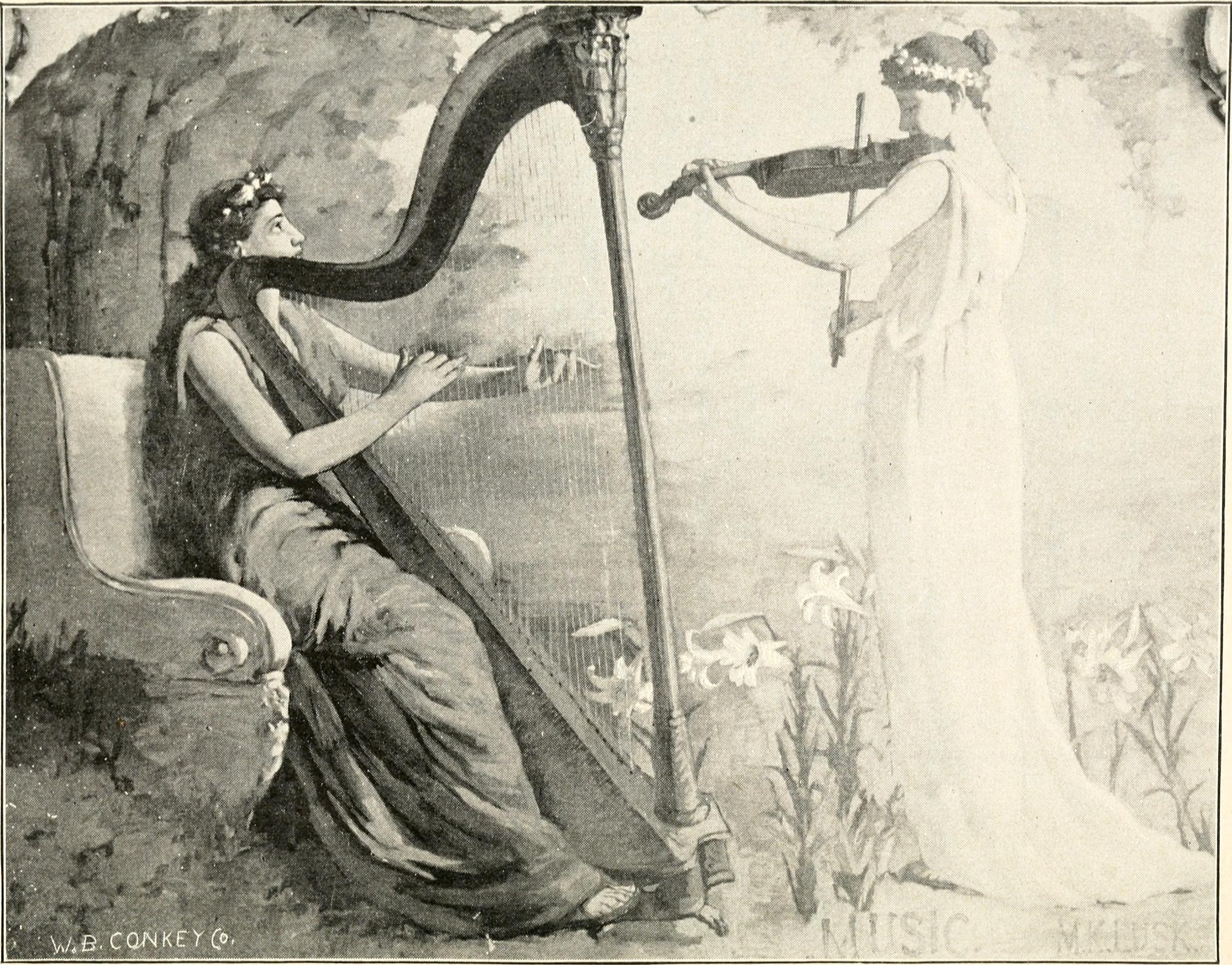
Music (1893)

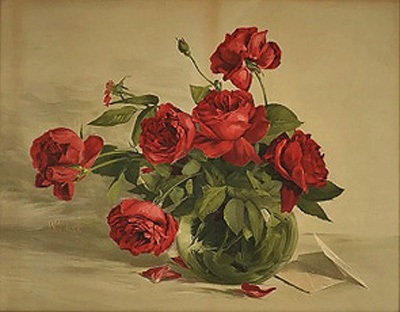
Red Roses

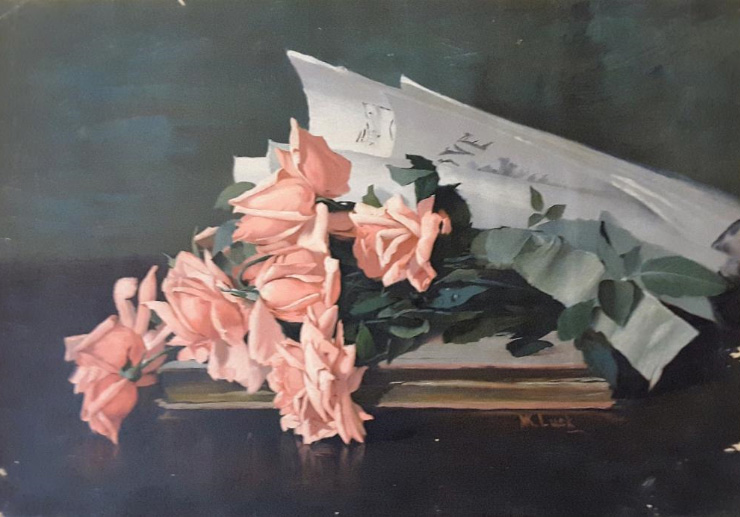
Sunny American La France Roses
