= Pištín =

- Municipality
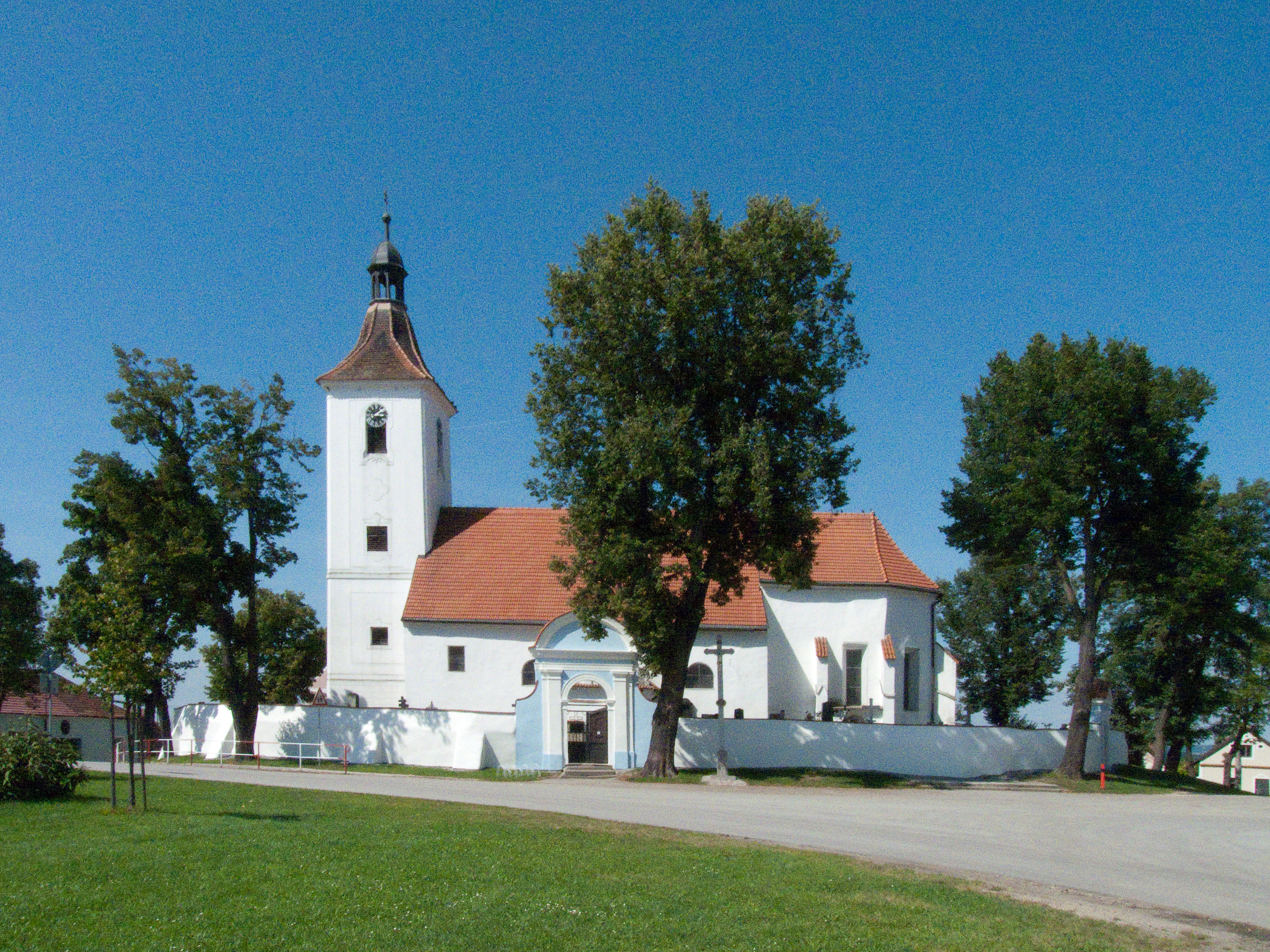
- Church of Saint Lawrence

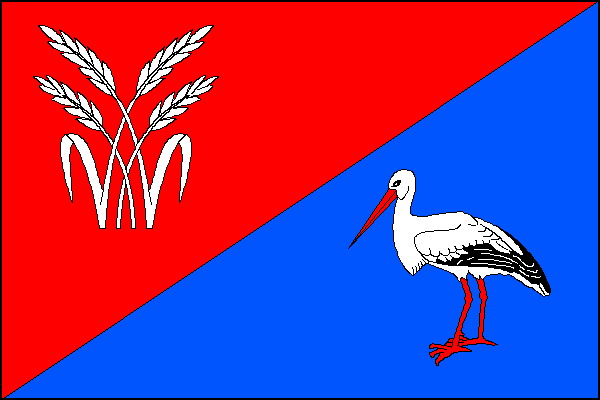
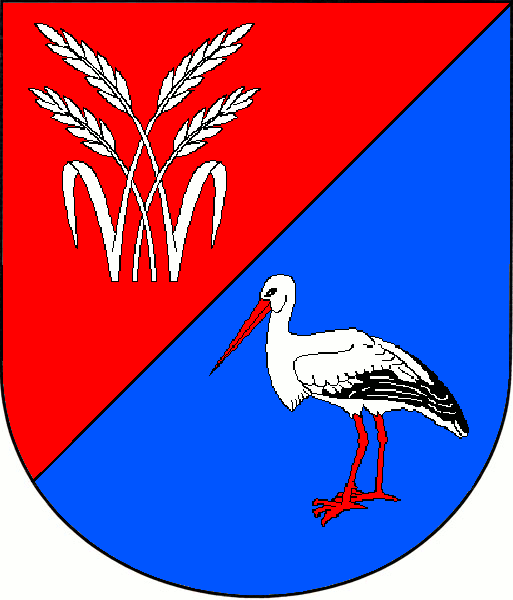
- Flag Coat of arms

- Location in the Czech Republic
- Coordinates: 49°2′45″N 14°20′7″E
- Country: Czech Republic
- Region: South Bohemian
- District: České Budějovice
- First mentioned: 1261

Area
  - Total: 14.03 km^{2} (5.42 sq mi)
- Elevation: 398 m (1,306 ft)

Population (2026-01-01)
  - Total: 682
  - Density: 48.6/km^{2} (126/sq mi)
- Time zone: UTC+1 (CET)
  - Summer (DST): UTC+2 (CEST)
- Postal code: 373 46
- Website: www.pistin.cz

Pištín is a municipality and village in České Budějovice District in the South Bohemian Region of the Czech Republic. It has about 700 inhabitants.

Pištín lies approximately 13 kilometres (8 mi) north-west of České Budějovice and 116 km (72 mi) south of Prague.

== Administrative division ==
Pištín consists of four municipal parts (in brackets population according to the 2021 census):

- Pištín (292)
- Češnovice (215)
- Pašice (89)
- Zálužice (30)

== Demographics ==
Historical population
Year	Pop.	±%
1869	838	—
1880	786	−6.2%
1890	782	−0.5%
1900	849	+8.6%
1910	895	+5.4%
1921	950	+6.1%
1930	922	−2.9%
1950	738	−20.0%
1961	673	−8.8%
1970	582	−13.5%
1980	560	−3.8%
1991	460	−17.9%
2001	470	+2.2%
2011	577	+22.8%
2021	626	+8.5%
Source: Censuses

== Notable people ==
- Marie Koupal Lusk (1862–1929), American painter
