= List of minister-presidents of Austria =

Minister-President of the Austrian Empire
- Coat of arms

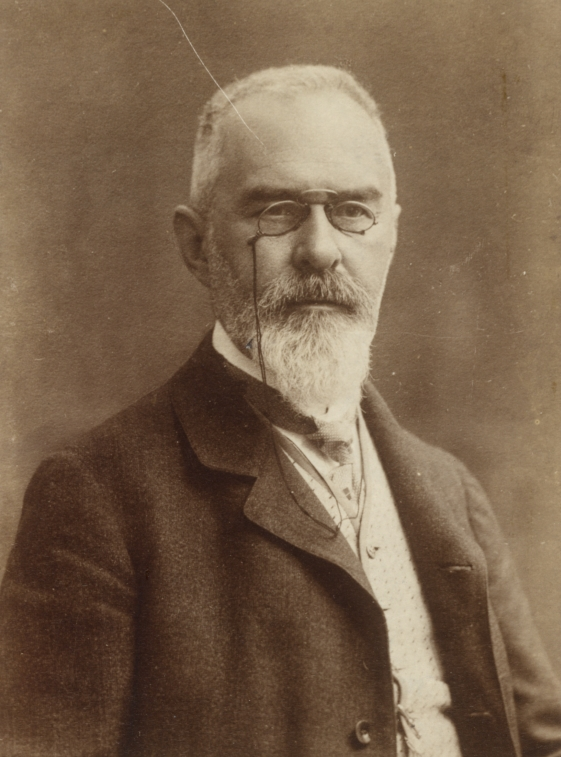
- Last in office Heinrich Lammasch; 27 October 1918 – 11 November 1918
- Status: Head of Government
- Seat: Vienna
- Precursor: State Chancellor of the Austrian Empire
- Formation: 20 March 1848
- First holder: Franz Anton
- Final holder: Heinrich Lammasch
- Abolished: 11 November 1918
- Succession: Chancellor of Austria

The minister-president of Austria was the head of government of the Austrian Empire from 1848, when the office was created in the course of the March Revolution. Previously, executive power rested with an Austrian State Council, headed by the emperor himself, from 1821 under the chairmanship of State Chancellor Prince Klemens von Metternich. The office of minister-president was not refilled from 1852, when Emperor Franz Joseph resumed control of the government affairs, and was replaced by a coordinating chairman of the Austrian Ministers' Conference.

According to the Austro-Hungarian Compromise of 1867, executive powers were divided between the emperor-king, the minister of the Imperial and Royal House and of Foreign Affairs as chairman of the k. u. k. Ministers' Council for Common Affairs, and the minister-presidents of the Cisleithanian (Austrian) and Hungarian halves of the Empire. After the dissolution of the Austro-Hungarian Monarchy in November 1918, the head of government in the Austrian Republic since 1920 has been the federal chancellor.

== Austrian Empire (1804–1867) ==
=== Minister-presidents ===
Portrait	Name (Birth–Death)	Ethnicity	Term of office		Political Party	Legislature (Election)	Emperor (Reign)
	Count Franz Anton von Kolowrat-Liebsteinsky (1778–1861)	Bohemian	20 March 1848	19 April 1848	Nonpartisan	None	Ferdinand I (1835–1848)
	Charles-Louis, Count of Ficquelmont (1777–1857)	French	19 April 1848	4 May 1848	Nonpartisan	None	Ferdinand I (1835–1848)
	Baron Franz von Pillersdorf (1786–1862)	German	4 May 1848	8 July 1848	Nonpartisan	I (1848)	Ferdinand I (1835–1848)
	Baron Anton von Doblhoff-Dier (1800–1872)	German	8 July 1848	18 July 1848	Nonpartisan	I (1848)	Ferdinand I (1835–1848)
	Baron Johann von Wessenberg-Ampringen (1773–1858)	German	18 July 1848	21 November 1848	Nonpartisan	I (1848)	Ferdinand I (1835–1848)
	Prince Felix of Schwarzenberg (1800–1852)	Bohemian	21 November 1848	5 April 1852	Nonpartisan	None	Francis Joseph I (1848–1916)

=== Presidents of the Conference of Ministers ===
Portrait	Name (Birth–Death)	Ethnicity	Term of office		Political Party	Emperor (Reign)
	Count Karl Ferdinand von Buol (1797–1865)	German	11 April 1852	21 August 1859	Nonpartisan	Francis Joseph I (1848–1916)
	Count Bernhard von Rechberg (1806–1899)	German	21 August 1859	4 February 1861	Nonpartisan	Francis Joseph I (1848–1916)
	Archduke Rainer Ferdinand of Austria (1827–1913)	German	4 February 1861	26 June 1865	Nonpartisan	Francis Joseph I (1848–1916)
	Count Alexander de Mensdorff-Pouilly (1813–1871)	French	26 June 1865	27 July 1865	Nonpartisan	Francis Joseph I (1848–1916)
	Count Richard Belcredi (1823–1902)	Italian	27 July 1865	7 February 1867	Nonpartisan	Francis Joseph I (1848–1916)
	Count Friedrich Ferdinand von Beust (1809–1886)	German	7 February 1867	30 December 1867	Nonpartisan	Francis Joseph I (1848–1916)

== Austria-Hungary (1867–1918) ==
=== Minister-presidents of Cisleithania ===
Constitutional (7) Federalist (7) Christian Social Party (4)
Portrait	Name (Birth–Death)	Term of office			Political Party	Legislature (Election)	Emperor (Reign)
	Prince Karl von Auersperg (1814–1890)	•	30 December 1867	24 September 1868	Constitutional Party	I (1867)	Francis Joseph I (1848–1916)
	Count Eduard von Taaffe (1833–1895)	1	24 September 1868	15 January 1870	Constitutional Party	I (1867)	Francis Joseph I (1848–1916)
	Baron Ignaz von Plener (1810–1908)	•	15 January 1870	1 February 1870	Constitutional Party	I (1867)	Francis Joseph I (1848–1916)
	Leopold Hasner von Artha (1818–1891)	•	1 February 1870	12 April 1870	Constitutional Party	I (1867)	Francis Joseph I (1848–1916)
	Count Alfred Józef Potocki (1817–1889)	•	12 April 1870	6 February 1871	Federalist Party	I (1867)	Francis Joseph I (1848–1916)
	Count Karl Sigmund von Hohenwart (1824–1899)	•	6 February 1871	30 October 1871	Federalist Party	I (1867)	Francis Joseph I (1848–1916)
	Baron Ludwig Holzgethan (1800–1876)	•	30 October 1871	25 November 1871	Nonpartisan	I (1867)	Francis Joseph I (1848–1916)
	Prince Adolf von Auersperg (1821–1885)	•	25 November 1871	15 February 1879	Constitutional Party	II (1871–72)	Francis Joseph I (1848–1916)
	Prince Adolf von Auersperg (1821–1885)	•	25 November 1871	15 February 1879	Constitutional Party	III (1873)	Francis Joseph I (1848–1916)
	Ritter Karl von Stremayr (1823–1904)	•	15 February 1879	12 August 1879	Constitutional Party	III (1873)	Francis Joseph I (1848–1916)
	Count Eduard von Taaffe (1833–1895)	2	12 August 1879	11 November 1893	Constitutional Party	IV (1879)	Francis Joseph I (1848–1916)
	Count Eduard von Taaffe (1833–1895)	2	12 August 1879	11 November 1893	Federalist Party	V (1885)	Francis Joseph I (1848–1916)
	Count Eduard von Taaffe (1833–1895)	2	12 August 1879	11 November 1893	Federalist Party	VI (1891)	Francis Joseph I (1848–1916)
	Alfred III, Prince of Windisch-Grätz (1851–1927)	•	11 November 1893	19 June 1895	Federalist Party	VI (1891)	Francis Joseph I (1848–1916)
	Count Erich von Kielmansegg (1847–1923)	•	19 June 1895	30 September 1895	Federalist Party	VI (1891)	Francis Joseph I (1848–1916)
	Count Count Kasimir Felix Badeni (1846–1909)	•	30 September 1895	30 November 1897	Federalist Party	VI (1891)	Francis Joseph I (1848–1916)
	Baron Paul Gautsch von Frankenthurn (1851–1918)	1	30 November 1897	5 March 1898	Christian Social Party	VII (1897)	Francis Joseph I (1848–1916)
	Prince Franz von Thun (1847–1916)	•	5 March 1898	2 October 1899	Federalist Party	VII (1897)	Francis Joseph I (1848–1916)
	Count Manfred von Clary-Aldringen (1852–1928)	•	2 October 1899	21 December 1899	Nonpartisan	VII (1897)	Francis Joseph I (1848–1916)
	Ritter Heinrich von Wittek (1844–1930)	•	21 December 1899	18 January 1900	Christian Social Party	VII (1897)	Francis Joseph I (1848–1916)
	Ernest von Koerber (1850–1919)	1	18 January 1900	31 December 1904	(Old) Constitutional Party	VIII (1900–01)	Francis Joseph I (1848–1916)
	Baron Paul Gautsch von Frankenthurn (1851–1918)	2	1 January 1904	2 May 1906	Christian Social Party	VIII (1900–01)	Francis Joseph I (1848–1916)
	Prince Konrad Hohenlohe-Schillingsfürst (1863–1918)	•	2 May 1906	2 June 1906	Nonpartisan	VIII (1900–01)	Francis Joseph I (1848–1916)
	Baron Max Wladimir von Beck (1854–1943)	•	2 June 1906	15 November 1908	Nonpartisan	IX (1907)	Francis Joseph I (1848–1916)
	Count Richard von Bienerth-Schmerling (1863–1918)	•	15 November 1908	28 June 1911	Nonpartisan	IX (1907)	Francis Joseph I (1848–1916)
	Baron Paul Gautsch von Frankenthurn (1851–1918)	3	28 June 1911	3 November 1911	Christian Social Party	X (1911)	Francis Joseph I (1848–1916)
	Karl von Stürgkh (1859–1916)	•	3 November 1911	21 October 1916	Nonpartisan (German National Association)	X (1911)	Francis Joseph I (1848–1916)
	Ernest von Koerber (1850–1919)	2	21 October 1916	20 December 1916	(Old) Constitutional Party (German National Association)	X (1911)	Francis Joseph I (1848–1916)
	Count Heinrich Clam-Martinic (1863–1932)	•	20 December 1916	23 June 1917	Nonpartisan (German National Association)	X (1911)	Charles I (1916–1918)
	Ernst Seidler von Feuchtenegg (1862–1931)	•	23 June 1917	27 July 1918	Nonpartisan	X (1911)	Charles I (1916–1918)
	Baron Max Hussarek von Heinlein (1865–1935)	•	27 July 1918	27 October 1918	Christian Social Party	X (1911)	Charles I (1916–1918)
	Heinrich Lammasch (1853–1920)	•	27 October 1918	11 November 1918	Christian Social Party	X (1911)	Charles I (1916–1918)

== See also ==
- List of heads of government under Austrian Emperors
- List of foreign ministers of Austria-Hungary
- List of chancellors of Austria
- Minister-President
