= Friedrich Ferdinand von Beust =

German and Austrian statesman (1809–1886)

Hochgeboren Friedrich Ferdinand Graf von Beust
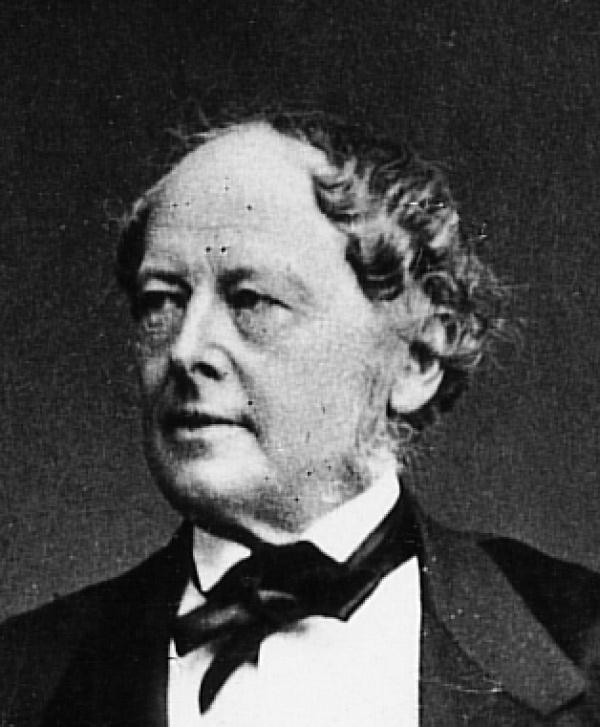
- Beust, c. 1860

6th Chairman of the Ministers' Conference of the Austrian Empire
- In office 7 February 1867 – 30 December 1867
- Monarch: Francis Joseph I
- Preceded by: Richard Graf von Belcredi
- Succeeded by: Karl Fürst von Auersperg (for Cisleithania); Gyula Andrássy (for Transleithania)

1st Chairman of the Ministers' Council for Common Affairs of Austria-Hungary
- In office 30 December 1867 – 8 November 1871
- Monarch: Francis Joseph I
- Preceded by: himself (for the Austrian Empire)
- Succeeded by: Gyula Andrássy

Interior Minister of the Austrian Empire
- In office 7 February 1867 – 7 March 1867
- Monarch: Francis Joseph I
- Preceded by: Richard Graf von Belcredi
- Succeeded by: Eduard Graf von Taaffe

1st Foreign Minister of Austria-Hungary
- In office 30 December 1866 – 8 November 1871
- Monarch: Francis Joseph I
- Preceded by: himself (as Foreign Minister of the Austrian Empire)
- Succeeded by: Gyula Andrássy

9th Foreign Minister of the Austrian Empire
- In office 30 October 1866 – 30 December 1866
- Monarch: Francis Joseph I
- Preceded by: Alexander Graf von Mensdorff-Pouilly
- Succeeded by: himself (as Foreign Minister of Austria-Hungary)

6th Minister-President of the Kingdom of Saxony
- In office 28 October 1858 – 15 August 1866
- Monarch: John, King of Saxony
- Preceded by: Ferdinand von Zschinsky
- Succeeded by: Johann Paul von Falkenstein

Personal details
- Born: 13 January 1809 Dresden, Kingdom of Saxony
- Died: 24 October 1886 (aged 77) Altenberg, Austria-Hungary
- Spouse: Mathilde von Jordan
- Children: Friedrich Graf von Beust

Count Friedrich Ferdinand von Beust (German: Friedrich Ferdinand Graf von Beust; 13 January 1809 – 24 October 1886) was a German and Austrian statesman. As an opponent of Otto von Bismarck, he attempted to conclude a common policy of the German middle states between Austria and Prussia.

== Birth and education ==
Beust was born in Dresden, where his father held office in the Saxon court. He was descended from a noble family which had originally sprung from the Margraviate of Brandenburg, and descended from Joachim von Beust (1522–1597). After studying at Leipzig and Göttingen he entered the Saxon public service.

== Political career ==
His initial political career was as a diplomat and politician in Saxony. In 1836 he was made secretary of legation at Berlin, and afterwards held appointments at Paris, Munich, and London.

In March 1848 he was summoned to Dresden to take the office of foreign minister, but in consequence of the outbreak of the revolution was not appointed. In May he was appointed Saxon envoy at Berlin, and in February 1849 was again summoned to Dresden, and this time appointed minister of state and of foreign affairs. He held that office till 1866, when he was summoned by Franz Josef I to the Imperial Court of Austria.

In addition to this he held the ministry of education and public worship from 1849 to 1853, and that of internal affairs in 1853, and in the same year was appointed minister-president. From the time that he entered the ministry he was, however, the leading member of it, and he was chiefly responsible for the events of 1849. By his advice the king rejected the German constitution proclaimed by the Frankfurt Parliament. This led to revolutionary outbreaks in Dresden. The riots were suppressed after four days of fighting by Prussian troops, whose assistance Beust had requested.

== Affairs of state ==
=== Saxony 1849–1866 ===
On Beust fell also the chief responsibility for governing the country after order was restored, and he was the author of the so-called coup d'état of June 1850 by which the new constitution was overthrown. The vigor he showed in repressing all resistance to the government, especially that of the university, and in reorganizing the police, made him one of the most unpopular men among the Liberals, and his name became synonymous with the worst form of reaction, but it is not clear that the attacks on him were justified.

After this he was chiefly occupied with foreign affairs, and he soon became one of the most conspicuous figures in German politics. He was the leader of that party which hoped to maintain the independence of the smaller states, and was the opponent of all attempts on the part of Prussia to attract them into a separate union. In 1849-1850 he was compelled to bring Saxony into the "three kings' union" of Prussia, Hanover and Saxony, but he was careful to keep open a loophole for withdrawal, of which he speedily availed himself. In the crisis of the Erfurt Union, Saxony was on the side of Austria, and he supported the restoration of the diet of the German Confederation.

In 1854 he took part in the Bamberg conferences, in which the smaller German states claimed the right to direct their own policy independently of Austria or of Prussia, and he was the leading supporter of the idea of the Trias, i.e., that the smaller states should form a closer union among themselves against the preponderance of the great monarchies. In 1863 he came forward as a warm supporter of the claims of the prince of Augustenburg to Schleswig-Holstein. He was the leader of the party in the German diet which refused to recognize the settlement of the Danish question effected in 1852 by the Treaty of London, and in 1864 he was appointed representative of the diet at the peace conference in London.

He was thus thrown into opposition to the policy of Bismarck, and he was exposed to violent attacks in the Prussian press as a particularist, i.e., a supporter of the independence of the smaller states. Already in the aftermath of the Second Schleswig War, the expulsion of the Saxon troops from Rendsburg nearly led to a conflict with Berlin. On the outbreak of the Austro-Prussian War in 1866, Beust accompanied King John of Saxony on his escape to Prague, and thence to Vienna, where they were received by allied Emperor Franz Joseph with the news of Königgrätz. Beust undertook a mission to Paris to procure the help of Napoleon III. When the terms of peace were discussed he resigned, for Bismarck refused to negotiate with him.

=== Austria 1866–1871 ===
After the victory of Prussia there was no office for Beust in an emerging Lesser Germany, and his public career seemed to be closed, but he quite unexpectedly received an invitation from Franz Joseph to become his foreign minister. It was a bold decision, for Beust was not only a stranger to Austria, but also a Protestant. He threw himself into his new position with great energy. Despite the opposition of the Slavs who foresaw that "dualism would lead Austria to downfall, negotiations with Hungary were resumed and rapidly concluded by Beust.

Impatient to take his revenge on Bismarck for Sadowa, he persuaded Francis Joseph to accept the Magyar demands which he had till then rejected. [...] Beust deluded himself that he could rebuild both the [Germanic Federation] and the Holy Roman Empire and negotiated the Ausgleich as a necessary preliminary for the revanche on Prussia. [...] As a compromise with Hungary for the purposes of revanche on Prussia, the Ausgleich could not be otherwise than a surrender to the Magyar oligarchy."

When difficulties came he went himself to Budapest, and acted directly with the Hungarian leaders. Beusts's desired revanche against Prussia did not materialize because, in 1870, the Hungarian Prime Minister Gyula Andrássy was "vigorously opposed."

In 1867 he also held the position of Austrian minister-president, and he carried through the measures by which parliamentary government was restored. He also carried on the negotiations with the Pope concerning the repeal of the Concordat of 1855, and in this matter also did much by a liberal policy to relieve Austria from the pressure of institutions which had checked the development of the country. In 1868, after giving up his post as minister-president, he was appointed Chancellor of the empire (Reichskanzler), and received the title of count. This was unusual, and he was the only statesman given the title of Chancellor between Metternich (1848) and Karl Renner (1918) (see Österreich-Lexikon). His conduct of foreign affairs, especially in the matter of the Balkan States and Crete, successfully maintained the position of the Empire. In 1869, he accompanied the Emperor on his expedition to the East. He was still to some extent influenced by the anti-Prussian feeling he had brought from Saxony.

He maintained a close understanding with France, and there can be little doubt that he would have welcomed an opportunity in his new position of another struggle with his old rival Bismarck. In 1867, however, he helped to bring the Luxembourg Crisis to a peaceful termination. In 1870 he did not disguise his sympathy for France. The failure of all attempts to bring about an intervention of the powers, joined to the action of Russia in denouncing the Treaty of Frankfurt, was the occasion of his celebrated saying that he was nowhere able to find Europe. After the war was over he completely accepted the new organization of Germany.

As early as December 1870 he had opened a correspondence with Bismarck with a view to establishing a good understanding with Germany. Bismarck accepted his advances with alacrity, and the new entente, which Beust announced to the Austro-Hungarian delegations in July 1871, was sealed in August by a friendly meeting of the two old rivals and enemies at Gastein.

In 1871 Beust interfered at the last moment, together with Andrassy, to prevent the emperor accepting the pro-Czech federalist plans of Hohenwart. He was successful, but at the same time he was dismissed from office. The precise cause for this is not known, and no reason was given him.

== Later diplomatic career 1871–1882 ==
At his own request he was appointed Austrian ambassador at London; in 1878 he was transferred to Paris; in 1882 he retired from public life.

== Death ==
He died at his villa at Altenberg, near Vienna, on 24 October 1886, leaving two sons, both of whom entered the Austrian diplomatic service. His wife survived him only a few weeks. His elder brother, Friedrich Konstantin von Beust (1806–1891), who was at the head of the Saxon department for mines, was the author of several works on mining and geology, a subject in which other members of the family had distinguished themselves.

== Writings ==
Beust was the author of reminiscences:

- Aus drei Viertel-Jahrhunderten (2 vols, Stuttgart, 1887; English trans. edited by Baron H de Worms)
- He also wrote a shorter work, Erinnerungen zu Erinnerungen (Leipzig, 1881), in answer to attacks made on him by his former colleague, Herr v. Frieseri, in his reminiscences.

See also Ebeling, F. F. Graf v. Beust (Leipzig 1876), a full and careful account of his political career, especially up to 1866; Diplomatic Sketches: No. 1, Count Beust, by Outsider (Baron Carl v. Malortie); Flathe, Geschichte von Sachsen, vol. iii. (Gotha, 1877); Friesen, Erinnerungen aus meinem Leben (Dresden, 1880).

== Famous descendants ==
His most famous descendant is Ole von Beust (born 13 April 1955, in Hamburg, Germany), who was First Mayor of the city-state of Hamburg from 2001 to 2010, also serving as President of the Bundesrat between 2007 and 2008.

== Honours ==
He received the following orders and decorations:

- Austria:
  - Grand Cross of the Imperial Order of Leopold, 1850
  - Grand Cross of the Royal Hungarian Order of St. Stephen, 1852; with Collar, 1866
  - Chancellor of the Military Order of Maria Theresa
- Tuscany: Grand Cross of St. Joseph
- Modena: Grand Cross of the Eagle of Este
- Bavaria:
  - Grand Cross of Merit of the Bavarian Crown, 1851
  - Knight of St. Hubert, 1868
- Saxony:
  - Knight of the Rue Crown, 1856
  - Grand Cross of the Civil Merit Order
- Mexico: Grand Cross of the Mexican Eagle
- Prussia:
  - Knight of Honour of the Johanniter Order, 18 January 1839
  - Knight of the Black Eagle, 7 September 1871
  - Grand Cross of the Red Eagle
- Russia: Knight of St. Alexander Nevsky, in Diamonds
- France: Grand Cross of the Legion of Honour, in Diamonds
- Italy:
  - Knight of the Annunciation, 2 December 1869
  - Grand Cross of Saints Maurice and Lazarus
- Ottoman Empire:
  - Order of Osmanieh, 1st Class in Diamonds
  - Order of the Medjidie, 1st Class
- Tunisia: Grand Cordon of the Order of Glory
- Spain: Grand Cross of the Order of Charles III, 4 May 1852
- Portugal: Grand Cross of the Tower and Sword, in Diamonds
- Brazil: Grand Cross of the Southern Cross
- Belgium: Grand Cordon of the Order of Leopold, 9 March 1851
- Netherlands: Grand Cross of the Netherlands Lion
- Greece: Grand Cross of the Redeemer
- Württemberg: Grand Cross of the Württemberg Crown, 1871
- Persia: Order of the Lion and the Sun, 1st Class with Grand Band
- Hanover: Grand Cross of the Royal Guelphic Order, 1851
- Hesse-Darmstadt: Grand Cross of the Ludwig Order, 29 November 1871
- Hesse-Kassel: Knight of the Golden Lion, 1 October 1857
- San Marino: Grand Cross of the Order of San Marino
- (Saxe-Coburg and Gotha) (Duchy of Saxe-Altenburg) (Saxe-Meiningen) Ernestine duchies: Grand Cross of the Saxe-Ernestine House Order, January 1851
- Saxe-Weimar-Eisenach: Grand Cross of the White Falcon, 22 May 1851
- Siam: Grand Cross of the Crown of Siam

== See also ==
- List of minister-presidents of Austria
- List of foreign ministers of Austria-Hungary

== Sources ==
- Schmitt, Hans A. "Count Beust and Germany, 1866–1870: Reconquest, Realignment, or Resignation?" Central European History (1968) 1#1 pp. 20–34 in JSTOR
- Sondhaus, Lawrence. "Austria-Hungary's Italian policy under Count Beust, 1866–1871," Historian (1993) 56#1 pp 41–64, online
- Österreich-Lexikon: Bundeskanzler

Preceded by Count Belcredi	Chairman of the Ministers' Council for Common Affairs of Austria-Hungary; 1867–1871	Succeeded by Prince Karl of Auersperg
Preceded by Count Belcredi	Chairman of the Ministers' Conference of the Austrian Empire; 1867	Succeeded by Prince Karl of Auersperg
Preceded by Count Mensdorff-Pouilly	Foreign Minister of the Austrian Empire; 1866–1871	Succeeded by Count Andrássy
Preceded by Count Belcredi	Interior Minister of the Austrian Empire; 1867	Succeeded by Eduard Taaffe, 11th Viscount Taaffe
