= Count Karl Sigmund von Hohenwart =

Austrian politician

Hochgeboren Karl Sigmund Graf von Hohenwart
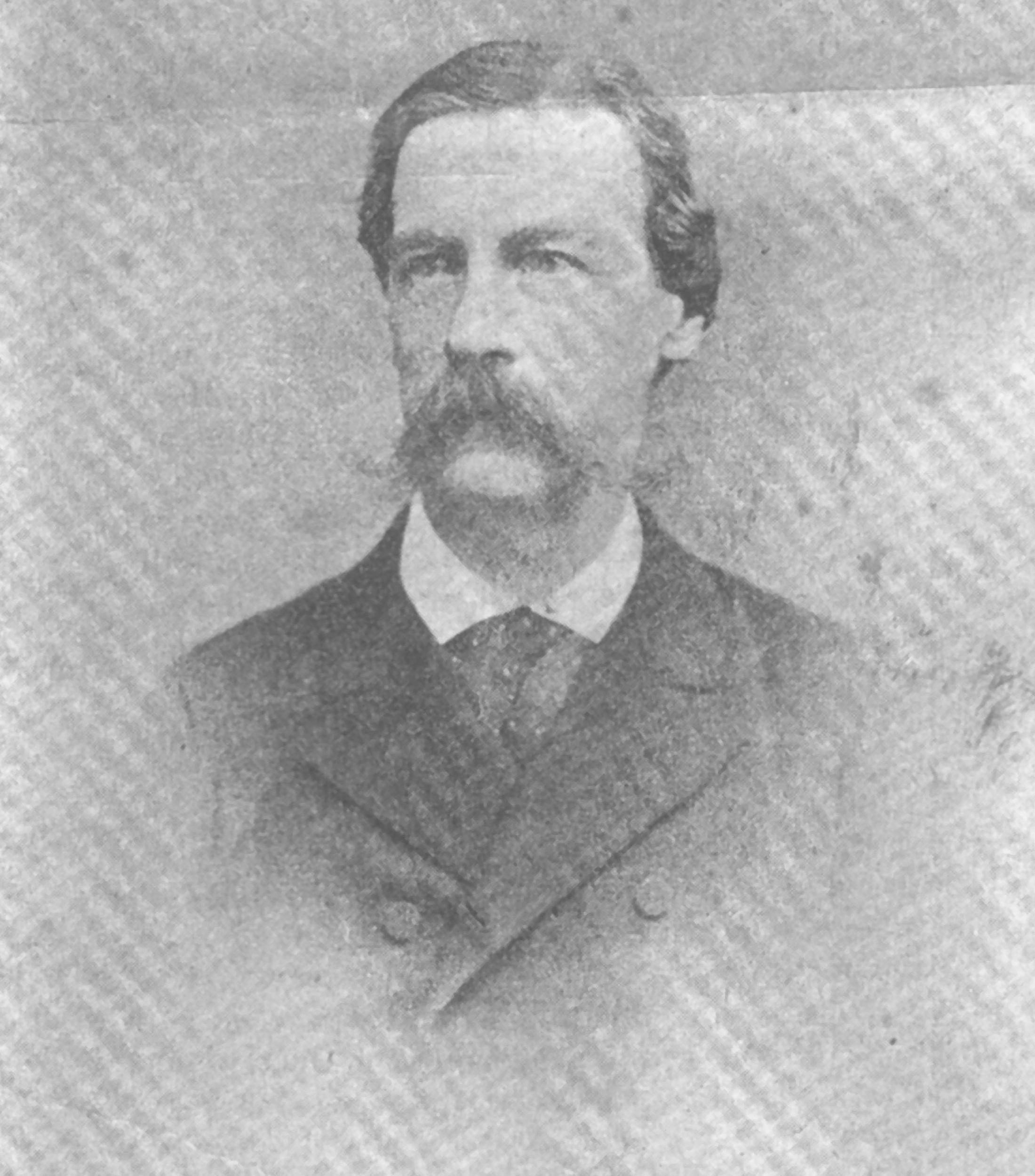
- Count Karl von Hogenwart

Minister-President of Austria
- In office 7 February 1871 – 30 October 1871
- Monarch: Francis Joseph I
- Preceded by: Alfred Józef Potocki
- Succeeded by: Ludwig von Holzgethan

Minister of the Interior of Austria
- In office 7 February 1871 – 30 October 1871
- Prime Minister: himself
- Preceded by: Eduard von Taaffe
- Succeeded by: Ludwig von Holzgethan

Personal details
- Born: 12 February 1824 Vienna
- Died: 26 April 1899 (aged 75)
- Party: Federalist Party

Count Karl Sigmund von Hohenwart (German: Karl Graf von Hohenwart; 12 February 1824 in Vienna – 26 April 1899) was an Austrian politician who served as Minister-President of Austria in 1871. Hohenwart's government attempted to implement a Federalist agreement between Bohemia and the governing Austro-Hungarian Empire. This attempt to conciliate the Bohemian Czechs caused massive criticism, and led to the fall of the Hohenwart government only months after it assumed office.

== Hohenwart's political posts and views ==
Karl Hohenwart was a German aristocrat and devout Roman Catholic. He held administrative posts in Carniola and Trentino (Italian speaking Tyrol). In 1868, Hohenwart became the Governor of Upper Austria. Hohenwart was the leader of the Conservative Federalists political faction in Austria. His political beliefs revolved around the view that Federalism and conciliation of Slavs was the only way to preserve the Austro-Hungarian Empire. Hohenwart believed that Federalism was only possible with equality between the nationalities of the Empire. Furthermore, Hohenwart believed in dealing only with leading nobles and other members at the top of the social order. Hohenwart distrusted social change.

== Hohenwart premiership ==
=== Hohenwart's ascent to power ===
The victory of Prussia in the Franco-Prussian War (1870) caused a shift in the politics of Austria. Emperor Francis Joseph turned against the Liberals who held the Premiership at the time because they were too enthusiastic for Prussia and its victory. Instead, Emperor Joseph turned to Conservatives willing to conciliate with Slavs. Hohenwart, as leader of the Conservative Federalists, was chosen in order to placate the Slavs with a new federalist system. Also, Emperor Francis Joseph saw Federalism as a way to undercut the Austro-German Liberals.

=== Hohenwart's cabinet ===
Emperor Francis Joseph appointed Hohenwart to the Premiership of Austria on 7 February 1871. The Hohenwart Ministry described itself in public statements as a "non-party." Also, the Hohenwart Ministry stated that its mission was to reconcile the people of Austria along federal lines.

The leading member of Hohenwart's cabinet was Albert Schäffle, the minister of commerce. Schäffle is considered to be the true leader of the Hohenwart Ministry's Federalization attempt. Some historians consider Hohenwart as a mere figurehead. Hohenwart also appointed two Czech ministers and one Pole. The Pole held the position of special minister of Galicia. This position was a concession to the Poles and one of the first conciliatory moves towards the Slavs made by Hohenwart.

=== Early moves of the Hohenwart ministry ===
One of the first successes of the Hohenwart ministry was the passing of the Budget Law of 1871. After this, Hohenwart dissolved the Parliament in Vienna and provincial diets. Hohenwart then called for the election of new diets. Hohenwart dissolved the diets because he had enough influence on big Estate owners to secure the election of federalist Conservatives. Also, the Hohenwart ministry enfranchised districts which would elect federalist Conservatives. With the dissolving of Parliament and the solidifying of political support, the stage was set for the development of a Federalist agreement.

=== Federalist agreement with Bohemia ===
After dissolving the diets, the Hohenwart ministry went to work on negotiating an agreement with Bohemian leaders. Schäffle, the Commerce Minister, took the lead in negotiation. He secretly negotiated an agreement with leading Czech nobles. The negotiations resulted in the "Fundamental Articles" and the "Nationality Laws."

The "Fundamental Articles" introduced a new federalist constitutional system for Bohemia. First, the "Fundamental Articles" accepted the Compromise of 1867. Second, the "Fundamental Articles" created a Bohemian Diet that sent representatives to the Austrian Parliament. The Austrian Parliament would be made up of representatives from several crownland diets. The functions of the Austrian Parliament would include commercial, military, and foreign relations. Third, the Austrian Herrenhaus (House of Lords) was to be replaced with an Austrian Senate that handled: treaties, jurisdictional conflicts, and constitutional revisions. Most important, the Bohemian Diet would have authority over all other local issues.

The "Nationality Laws" came as corollaries to the "Fundamental Articles." They created administrative areas which would be nationally homogeneous. Furthermore, the Czech and German languages would become the official languages for all functions pertaining to all of Bohemia.

In September 1871 the Bohemian Diet reconvened. Czech deputies now outnumbered German deputies. As a result, the German deputies all left the Bohemian Diet. On 12 September Emperor Francis Joseph issued an Imperial Rescript asking the Bohemian Diet to "draft a constitutional charter." The Bohemian Diet then unanimously accepted the "Fundamental Articles" and "Nationality Laws." Once the Emperor accepted these laws, he was to be crowned King of Bohemia.

=== Criticism of the Federalist Agreement ===
The Hohenwart agreements with the Bohemians sparked massive criticisms. Ultimately, German Liberals led by Count Beust and Magyars led by Andrassy would sink the federalist agreements and the Hohenwart government.

When the "Fundamental Articles" and "Nationality Laws" were publicly announced they infuriated the public. Germans in Bohemia protested vociferously. In addition, Austro-German liberals were strongly against it. Germans in Vienna rioted in protest over the proposals. There was criticism among the Slavs in Bohemia too. Some Czechs saw the "Nationality Laws" as a precursor to a division of Bohemia into German and Czech parts. Czech nationalist wanted to maintain all of Bohemia under a Bohemian crown. In addition, the Moravian and Silesian Diets opposed the concept of being subsumed into an enlarged Bohemian General Diet.

The strongest criticisms came from Foreign Minister Beust and Magyar leader Julius Andrassy. Both of these men were political opponents of Hohenwart and critics of Federalism. Beust told Emperor Francis Joseph that Federalism would incite German opposition in Austria and might even lead to Prussian intervention. Andrassy voiced concerns over the technicalities of the proposals and told the Emperor that Federalism would affect the finances and organization of the Empire. In reality, Andrassy feared that Bohemian autonomy would adversely affect Hungary's position within the Empire. Also, Andrassy feared that the Federalization of Austria would cause minority groups within Hungary to demand similar arrangements.

=== The fall of the Hohenwart ministry ===
The public outcry and the political machinations of Beust and Andrassy convinced Emperor Francis Joseph to side against the Hohenwart proposals. On 20 October the Emperor issued a new Imperial Rescript which rescinded the 12 September Rescript that sided with Federalization. Hohenwart attempted to reach a new deal with the Czechs that called for autonomy for lesser Bohemia. The Czechs rejected the deal and Hohenwart and his government resigned on 27 October.

== Later political career ==
Hohenwart continued to maintain a presence in Austrian politics following his failed Premiership. He served under Minister-President Eduard Graf Taaffe from 1879 until 1892. Taaffe's government was based on coalition of conservative German and Slav politicians known as the "Iron Ring." Hohenwart was the head of a conservative group of Catholics from the Alpine regions and allied southern Slavs.

== Orders and decorations ==
- Knight of the Imperial Order of the Iron Crown, 1st Class, 1879
- Grand Cross of the Austrian Imperial Order of Leopold, 1890
- Grand Cross of the Order of Saints Maurice and Lazarus (Kingdom of Italy)
- Commander of the Order of Pope Pius IX (Holy See)
- Order of Meiji, 1st Class (Empire of Japan)

Preceded by Count Alfred Józef Potocki	Minister-President of Austria; 1871	Succeeded by Baron Ludwig von Holzgethan
