= Count Johann Bernhard von Rechberg und Rothenlöwen =

Austrian statesman (1806–1899)

His Illustrious Highness Johann Bernhard Graf von Rechberg und Rothenlöwen
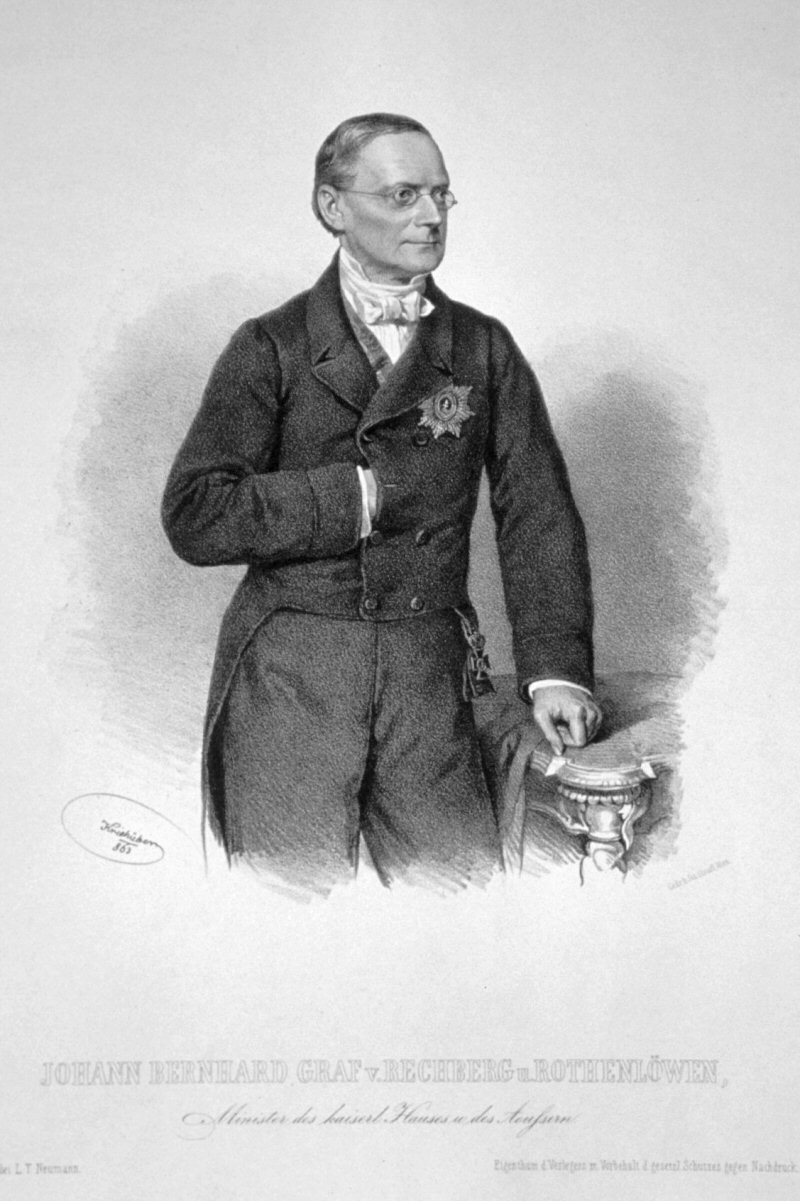
- Lithograph by Josef Kriehuber, 1863

2nd Chairman of the Austrian Ministers' Conference
- In office 21 August 1859 – 4 February 1861
- Monarch: Francis Joseph I
- Preceded by: Karl Ferdinand von Buol
- Succeeded by: Erzherzog Rainer Ferdinand von Österreich

7th Foreign Minister of the Austrian Empire
- In office 17 May 1859 – 27 October 1864
- Preceded by: Karl Ferdinand Graf von Buol
- Succeeded by: Alexander Graf von Mensdorff-Pouilly

Personal details
- Born: 17 July 1806 Regensburg, Bavaria, Holy Roman Empire
- Died: 26 February 1899 (aged 92) Kettenhof Castle, Schwechat, Austria-Hungary

Count Johann Bernhard von Rechberg und Rothenlöwen (German: Johann Bernhard Graf von Rechberg und Rothenlöwen) (17 July 1806 – 26 February 1899) was an Austrian statesman and a member of an old Swabian House of Rechberg.

== Early life ==
Born at Regensburg as the second son of the Bavarian statesman Count Aloys von Rechberg und Rothenlöwen zu Hohenrechberg (1766–1849) and his wife, Countess Maria Anna Amalie Friederike von Schlitz gen. von Görtz (1778-1825).

== Biography ==
Johann Bernhard was destined for the Bavarian public service, his elder brother being a hereditary member of the Upper House in the parliament of Württemberg. He was educated at the University of Strasbourg and the Ludwig-Maximilians-Universität München, but he incurred the displeasure of King Ludwig I of Bavaria by the part he played as second in a duel, and in 1828 he transferred himself to the Austrian diplomatic service.

After being attached to the embassies in Berlin, London and Brussels, he was appointed envoy at Stockholm (1841) and at Rio de Janeiro (1843). Returning to Europe in 1847, on the outbreak of the Revolution of 1848 in Vienna he was of great service to State Chancellor Prince Klemens von Metternich, whom he accompanied and assisted in his flight to England. In July 1848 he was appointed Austrian plenipotentiary in the German Frankfurt Parliament, in 1851 became Austrian internuncius at Constantinople, and in 1853 Radetzky's civilian colleague in the government of Lombardy-Venetia. In 1855, he returned to Frankfurt as Austrian representative and president of the federal diet. As a pupil of Metternich he would have wished to preserve the good understanding with Prussia which seemed the necessary foundation for a conservative policy; he was, however, made the instrument for the anti-Prussian policy of Buol, the foreign minister; this brought about constant disputes with Bismarck, at that time Prussian envoy at the diet, which were sharpened by Rechberg's choleric temper, and on one occasion nearly led to a duel. Bismarck, however, always expressed a high appreciation of his character and abilities. In May 1859, on the eve of the Second Italian War of Independence (1859), he was appointed Austrian minister of foreign affairs and minister-president, surrendering the latter post to the Archduke Rainer in the following year.

The five years during which Rechberg held the portfolio of foreign affairs covered the war with Piedmont and France, the insurrection in Poland, the attempted reform of the German Confederation through the Frankfurt Fürstentag, and the Austro-Prussian war with Denmark. After the defeat of Magenta Rechberg accompanied the emperor to Italy, and he had to meet the crisis caused by a war for which he was not responsible. He began the concessions to Hungary and in the Polish question, and was responsible for the adhesion of Austria to the alliance of the Western Powers. In the German question Rechberg's policy was one of compromise. To the project of the Fürstentag he was altogether opposed. The project had been suggested to the emperor Franz Joseph by his son-in-law, the hereditary prince of Thurn und Taxis, and the preliminary arrangements were made without Rechberg being informed. When at last he was told, he tendered his resignation, which was not accepted, and he accompanied the emperor to the abortive meeting at Frankfurt (August 1863). The attempt made by Rechberg at the subsequent ministerial conference at Nuremberg to establish a German league without Prussia was equally unsuccessful, and he now returned to the policy, which in opposition to Schmerling he had throughout advocated, of a peaceful arrangement between Prussia and Austria as the indispensable preliminary to a reform of the Confederation.

At this juncture the death of King Frederick VII of Denmark (15 November 1863) opened up the whole Schleswig-Holstein question. In the diplomatic duel that followed Rechberg was no match for Bismarck. It suited Austrian policy to act in concert with Prussia against Denmark; but Rechberg well knew that Bismarck was aiming at the annexation of the duchies. He attempted to guard against this by laying down as a condition of the alliance that the duchies should only be separated from Denmark by common consent of the two German powers. Bismarck, however, insisted that the question of the ultimate destination of the duchies should be left open; and, when he backed his argument with the threat that unless Austria accepted his proposal Prussia would act alone, Rechberg gave way. His action was made the object of violent attacks in the Austrian Lower House (28–30 January 1864), and when the war was victoriously concluded and Prussia's designs on the duchies had become evident, public opinion turned more and more against him, demanding that Austria should support the Duke of Augustenburg even at the risk of war. Rechberg yielded so far as to assure the duke's representative at Vienna that Austria was determined to place him in possession of the duchies, but only on condition that he did not sign away any of his sovereign rights to Prussia. The outcome of this was that the duke refused the terms offered by King William and Bismarck.

On 22 August there was a meeting of the emperor Franz Joseph and King William at Schönbrunn, both Rechberg and Bismarck being present. Rechberg himself was in favor of allowing Prussia to annex the duchies, on condition that Prussia should guarantee Austria's possession of Venice and the Adriatic coast. On the first point no agreement was reached; but the principles of an Austro-Prussian alliance in the event of a French invasion of Italy were agreed upon. This latter proposal was, however, received with violent opposition in the ministry, where Rechberg's influence had long been overshadowed by that of Schmerling; public opinion, utterly distrustful of Prussian promises, was also greatly excited; and on 27 October Rechberg handed in his resignation, receiving at the same time the Order of the Golden Fleece from the emperor as a sign of special favor. He had been made a hereditary member of the Upper House of the Reichsrat in 1861, and as late as 1879 continued occasionally to take part in debates. He died at his chateau (Schloss Altkettenhof) of Kettenhof (today: Schwechat) near Vienna on 26 February 1899.

== Personal life ==
He had married, in 1834, Hon. Barbara Jones (1813-1894), the eldest daughter of the Thomas Jones, 6th Viscount Ranelagh (1763–1820), by whom he had one son:

- Count Louis von Rechberg und Rothenlöwen zu Hohenrechberg (b. 1835 - d. 1877); married Landgravine Aloysia Luise Marie zu Fürstenberg-Weitra (1840 - 1925) and had issue.

== Honours ==
He received the following orders and decorations:

- Grand Duchy of Hesse:
  - Commander of the Ludwig Order, 2nd Class, 23 May 1837; Grand Cross, 2 September 1860
  - Grand Cross of the Merit Order of Philip the Magnanimous, 29 June 1855
- Kingdom of Bavaria:
  - Grand Cross of the Merit Order of St. Michael, 1849
  - Knight of St. Hubert, 1860
- Austrian Empire:
  - Knight of the Iron Crown, 1st Class, 1850
  - Grand Cross of the Royal Hungarian Order of St. Stephen, 1860
  - Knight of the Golden Fleece, 27 October 1864
- Duchy of Parma: Grand Cross of St. Louis for Civil Merit, 1854
- Kingdom of Hanover: Grand Cross of the Royal Guelphic Order, 1855
- Kingdom of Prussia: Knight of the Black Eagle, 2 August 1860; in Diamonds, 1864
- Mexican Empire: Grand Cross of the Imperial Order of Guadalupe, 1864

Government offices
Preceded by Count Buol	Foreign Minister of Austria; 1859–1864	Succeeded by Count Mensdorff-Pouilly
