= Ludwig Freiherr von Holzgethan =

Austrian politician

Hochwohlgeboren Ludwig Freiherr von Holzgethan

Minister-President of Austria
- In office 30 October 1871 – 25 November 1871
- Monarch: Francis Joseph I
- Preceded by: Karl Sigmund von Hohenwart
- Succeeded by: Adolf von Auersperg

Minister of the Interior of Austria
- In office 30 October 1871 – 25 November 1871
- Prime Minister: Himself
- Preceded by: Karl Sigmund von Hohenwart
- Succeeded by: Joseph Lasser von Bollheim

Personal details
- Born: 1 October 1800 Vienna
- Died: 12 June 1876 (aged 75) Vienna

Ludwig Holzgethan, since 1855 von Holzgethan, since 1865 Baron (Freiherr) von Holzgethan (1 October 1800 in Vienna – 12 June 1876 in Vienna) was an Austrian statesman. He was Minister of Finance of Austria-Hungary from 1872 until his death.
