= Count Karl Ferdinand von Buol =

Austrian statesman

Hochgeboren Karl Ferdinand Graf von Buol-Schauenstein
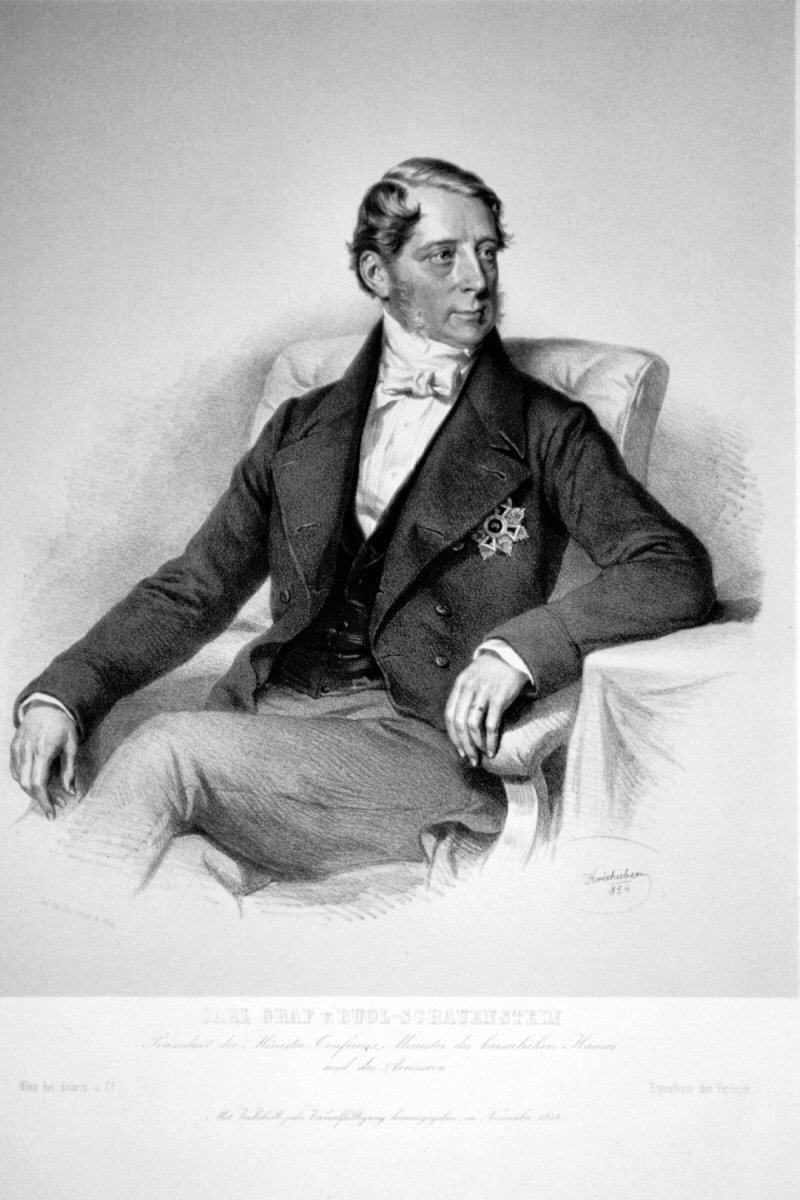
- Lithograph by Josef Kriehuber, 1854

1st Chairman of the Austrian Ministers' Conference
- In office 11 April 1852 – 4 May 1859
- Monarch: Francis Joseph I
- Preceded by: Prince Felix of Schwarzenberg (as Minister-President)
- Succeeded by: Johann Bernhard Graf von Rechberg

6th Foreign Minister of the Austrian Empire
- In office 11 April 1852 – 17 May 1859
- Preceded by: Prince Felix of Schwarzenberg
- Succeeded by: Johann Bernhard von Rechberg

Personal details
- Born: 17 May 1797 Vienna, Archduchy of Austria, Holy Roman Empire
- Died: 28 October 1865 (aged 68) Vienna, Austrian Empire
- Spouse: Caroline Franziska von Isenburg-Birstein
- Children: 2

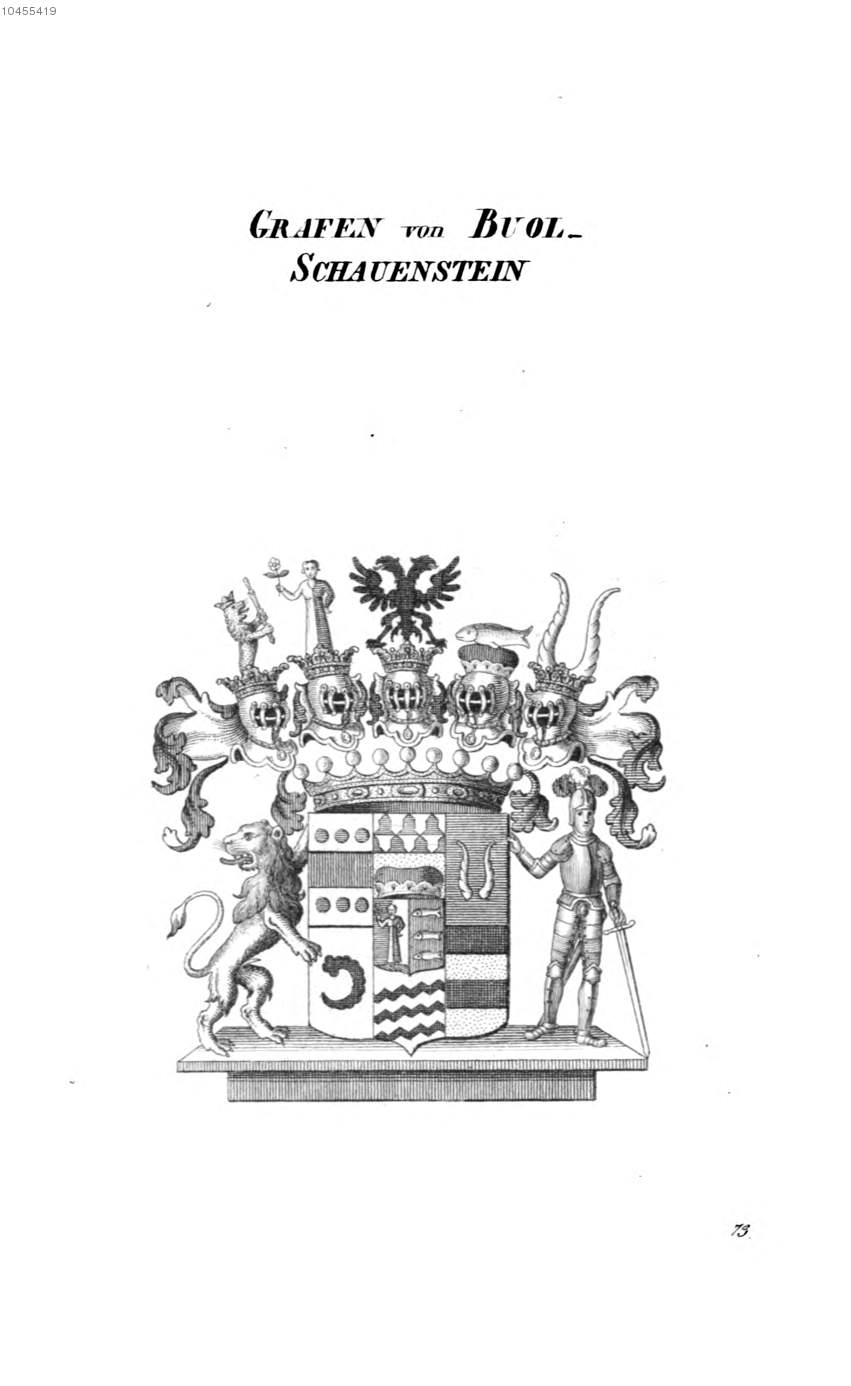
Arms of the Count von Buol-Schauenstein

Karl Ferdinand von Buol (German: Karl Ferdinand Graf von Buol-Schauenstein; 17 May 1797 – 28 October 1865) was an Austrian Empire diplomatist and statesman, who served as Foreign Minister of Austrian Empire from 1852 to 1859.

== Early life ==
Karl was born in Vienna, a scion of a Grisons noble family descending from Fürstenau. His father Count Johann Rudolf von Buol-Schauenstein (1763–1834) from 1816 until 1823 chaired the Austrian delegation to the Bundesversammlung of the German Confederation. His mother was Countess Alexandrine von und zu Lerchenfeld (b. 1769).

== Biography ==
He joined the Austrian foreign service and served successively as envoy to Baden at Karlsruhe (1828–1838), to Württemberg at Stuttgart (1838–1844), to Sardinia-Piedmont at Turin (1844–1848), to Russia at Saint Petersburg (1848–1850), to the German ministerial conference at Dresden 1850/51, and to the United Kingdom at London (1851–1852). He became an increasingly close associate of the Austrian Minister-President, Prince Felix of Schwarzenberg, and when Schwarzenberg suddenly died in April 1852, Buol succeeded him as foreign minister, although not as Premier, as the young Emperor Franz Joseph himself now took a more direct role in directing cabinet affairs than he had previously.

As foreign minister, Buol soon had to deal with the Near Eastern crisis which had erupted by early 1854 into the Crimean War, as France and Britain had declared war on Russia in an effort to support the Ottoman Empire. In this crisis, Austria's position was a tenuous one. Russia's intervention to suppress the Hungarian Revolution of 1848, and its subsequent intervention on behalf of Austria against Prussia leading to the Punctation of Olmütz in 1850, put the Austrians substantially in the debt of the Tsar Nicholas I. Furthermore, the geographical positions involved meant that in any war with Russia, Austria, even if allied with France and Britain, would bear the brunt of the fighting. On the other hand, permanent Russian control of the Danubian Principalities (later part of Romania) would greatly endanger Austria's strategic position, and the Austrians were more generally opposed to any expansion of Russian influence in the Balkans. Thus, Buol attempted to pursue a middle course, trying to mediate between the belligerent parties.

Soon, however, this did not prove enough, and Buol, who was noted in Austria as an Anglophile, soon cast his lot more clearly with the western powers. An ultimatum was sent to Russia to demand that it evacuate the Principalities. The Russians agreed, and Austria occupied the Principalities for the remainder of the war. This perceived betrayal by the Austrians insured the Tsar's undying enmity, but proved not enough to satisfy the western powers. As the conflict dragged on into 1855, Buol sent another ultimatum to Russia, this time demanding that it accede to the French and British terms, or face a war with Austria. This time the Russians, now under Tsar Alexander II, acceded, and preliminary peace accords were signed at Vienna later that year.

Buol's policy in the Crimean War had managed to keep Austria out of the war, but had left it badly isolated. Russia, Austria's only reliable ally, had been completely alienated, while the French and British had not been impressed by Austria's failure to come into the war on their side, and continued to oppose Austrian influence in the Italian Kingdom of Lombardy–Venetia. The French, eager to form an entente with the Russians in the wake of the war, also took it upon themselves to oppose Austrian projects in the Balkans. The Prussians, as always, demanded a high price in terms of Austrian acquiescence to Prussian domination of northern Germany, in exchange for any support for their German neighbors.

The consequences of this were to make themselves clear in 1859. Now Camillo di Cavour, the Prime Minister of Sardinia-Piedmont, anxious to goad the Austrians into a war in which he knew he would have French support, engaged in a series of provocations against the Austrian position in Italy. Although Buol and the Austrians initially seemed unperturbed, to the extent that Cavour and his ally, Emperor Napoleon III of France, feared they would not be able to have their war, Buol soon gave them what they wanted by a clumsy ultimatum demanding Piedmontese demobilization. The Sardinian War which followed would prove disastrous for the Austrian position in Italy, but Buol himself was already dismissed in May 1859, for the missteps which had brought about the war.

Buol spent the rest of his life in retirement and died in 1865 in Vienna, aged 68.

Von Beust, in his memoirs, recalls an opinion of Metternich: "Count von Buol is like a blade which can sting, but not cut."

== Personal life and issue ==
On 26 April 1830 he married in Mannheim Princess Caroline von Isenburg und Büdingen zu Birstein (1809–1861), daughter of Prince Karl Theodor von Isenburg und Büdingen zu Birstein (1778–1823) and his wife, Baroness Marie Magdalene von Herding (1789–1859). They had two daughters:

- Countess Josephine Caroline Alexandrine Marie von Buol-Schauenstein (1835–1916), married to Lensgreve Otto Poul Julius Gustav Blome; had issue
- Countess Alexandrine von Buol-Schauenstein (1837–1901), married to Count Kálmán Hunyady de Kéthely; had issue

== Honours ==
He received the following orders and decorations:

- Austria:
  - Grand Cross of the Royal Hungarian Order of St. Stephen, 1856
  - Grand Cross of the Imperial Order of Leopold
  - Knight of the Iron Crown, 1st Class
- Baden:
  - Grand Cross of the House Order of Fidelity, 1830
  - Grand Cross of the Zähringer Lion, 1830
- Bavaria: Knight of St. Hubert, 1853
- Belgium: Grand Cordon of the Order of Leopold
- Brazil: Grand Cross of the Rose
- Brunswick: Grand Cross of Henry the Lion
- Denmark: Knight of the Elephant, 11 June 1852
- (Saxe-Coburg and Gotha) (Duchy of Saxe-Altenburg) (Saxe-Meiningen) Ernestine duchies: Grand Cross of the Saxe-Ernestine House Order, July 1853
- France: Grand Cross of the Legion of Honour
- Greece: Grand Cross of the Redeemer
- Hesse-Kassel: Grand Cross of the Wilhelmsorden
- Hesse-Darmstadt: Grand Cross of the Ludwig Order, 23 May 1837
- Holy See: Grand Cross of the Order of Pope Pius IX, in Diamonds
- Sovereign Military Order of Malta: Bailiff Grand Cross of Honour and Devotion
- Modena: Grand Cross of the Eagle of Este, 1857
- Netherlands: Grand Cross of the Netherlands Lion
- Ottoman Empire: Order of Osmanieh, 1st Class
- Parma:
  - Grand Cross of St. Louis for Civil Merit, 1852
  - Senator Grand Cross of the Constantinian Order of St. George, 1852
- Portugal: Grand Cross of Our Lady of Conception
- Prussia:
  - Knight of the Black Eagle
  - Knight of the Red Eagle, 1st Class
- Russia:
  - Knight of St. Alexander Nevsky, in Diamonds
  - Knight of the White Eagle
- Saxony: Knight of the Rue Crown, 1856
- Two Sicilies: Knight of St. Januarius
- Württemberg: Grand Cross of the Württemberg Crown

== See also ==
- Internationalization of the Danube River

Diplomatic posts
Preceded by Franz de Paula von Colloredo-Wallsee	Ambassador of Austria to Russia; 1848–1851	Succeeded by Eduard von Lebzelten-Collenbach
Preceded by Franz de Paula von Colloredo-Wallsee	Ambassador of Austria to the United Kingdom; 1851–1852	Succeeded by Franz de Paula von Colloredo-Wallsee
Government offices
Preceded by Prince Schwarzenberg	Chairman of the Austrian Ministers' Conference; Foreign Minister of the Austrian Empire; 1852–1859	Succeeded by Count Rechberg
