= Albert Schäffle =

Albert Eberhard Friedrich Schäffle (24 February 1831 – 25 December 1903) was a German sociologist, political economist, and newspaper editor.

== Biography ==
=== Early years ===
Albert Schäffle was born at Nürtingen in Württemberg on 24 February 1831. In 1848 he became a student at the University of Tübingen.

=== Career ===
He had studied for the ministry, but started out in journalism as his career. From 1850 to 1860 he was attached to the editorial staff of the Schwäbische Merkur in Stuttgart, and in the latter year accepted a call to the chair of political economy at the University of Tübingen.

From 1862 to 1864 Schäffle was a member of the Württemberg diet, and in 1868 he received a mandate to the German Zollparlament. During this year he was appointed professor of political science at the University of Vienna.

In 1871 Schäffle resigned his professorship to join the cabinet of Count Karl Sigmund von Hohenwart as minister of commerce for Austria. The government fell in that same year, however, and Schäffle took up residence in Stuttgart, where he devoted himself entirely to literary work.

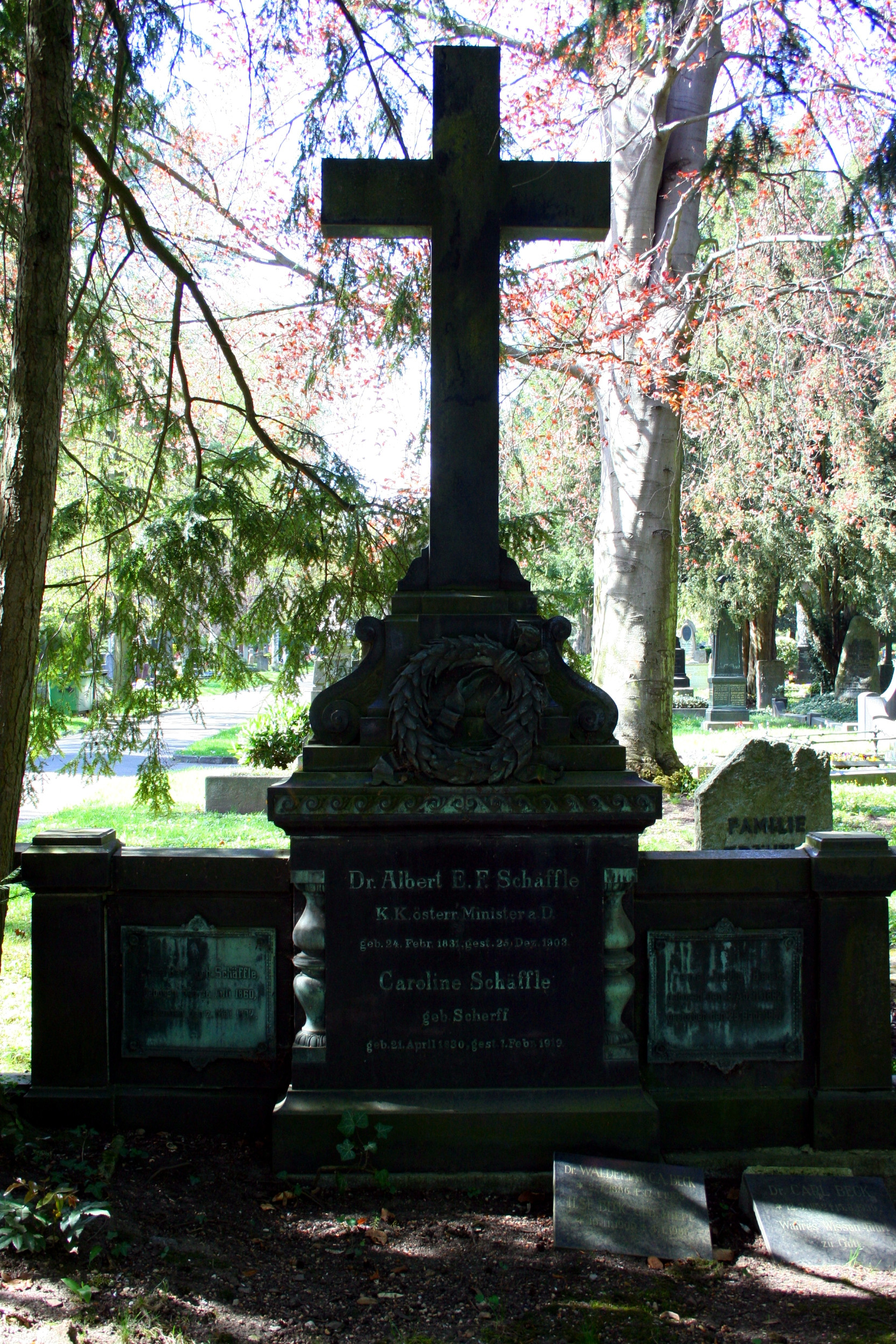
Gravesite of Albert Schäffle at the Pragfriedhof in Stuttgart

Schäffle's magnum opus, a treatise called Bau und Leben des sozialen Körpers (Construction and Life of the Social Body) was published in four volumes from 1875 to 1878. The work was a grandiose attempt to create a unified system combining the natural and social sciences. Schäffle attempted to show a unity between human social behavior and the biological processes observed by natural science, while retaining a spiritual aspect in the tradition of German idealist philosophy.

In a second edition of this work, published in two volumes in 1896, Schäffle emphasized the state-interventionist implications of his work, describing the economy of the "rational social state" in fine detail.

In his Quintessence of Socialism (1875) and The Impossibility of Social Democracy (1885), Schäffle developed a critique of socialism which focused on the problem of incentives in large-scale collectives. His conclusion was that classical socialism and democracy were incompatible. Schäffle thus foreshadowed some of the criticisms of socialism by Ludwig von Mises and Friedrich Hayek.

From 1892 to 1901 Schäffle was the sole editor of the Zeitschrift für die gesamte Staatswissenschaft.

=== Death and legacy ===
Albert Schäffle died at Stuttgart on 25 December 1903.

== Works ==
- Die nationalökonomische Theorie der ausschließenden Absatzverhältnisse (1867)
- Kapitalismus und Sozialismus (1870)
- Das gesellschaftliche System der menschlichen Wirtschaft (1873; 2 Bände)
- Die Quintessenz des Sozialismus (1874) Digitalisat auf archive.org (PDF; 14 MB)
  - "The Quintessence of Socialism" (translated to English by B. Bosanquet) 1890.
- Bau und Leben des sozialen Körpers (1875–78; 4 Bände)
- Encyklopädie der Staatslehre (1878)
- Grundsätze der Steuerpolitik (1880)
- Die Aussichtslosigkeit der Sozialdemokratie (1885). English translation excerpted in https://www.cambridge.org/core/journals/journal-of-institutional-economics/article/the-impossibility-of-social-democracy-by-albert-e-f-schaffle/C3812F00382ECCFC3948CF37CCA684F8
- Gesammelte Aufsätze (1885–87; 2 Bände)
- Zum Kartellwesen und zur Kartellpolitik, in: Zeitschrift für die gesamte Staatswissenschaft, 54 (1898), S. 467-528.
- Aus meinem Leben (1905)
- Abriss der Soziologie (1906)
