= Franz, Prince of Thun and Hohenstein =

Austrian politician (1847–1916)

Durchlaucht Franz Anton Fürst von Thun und Hohenstein
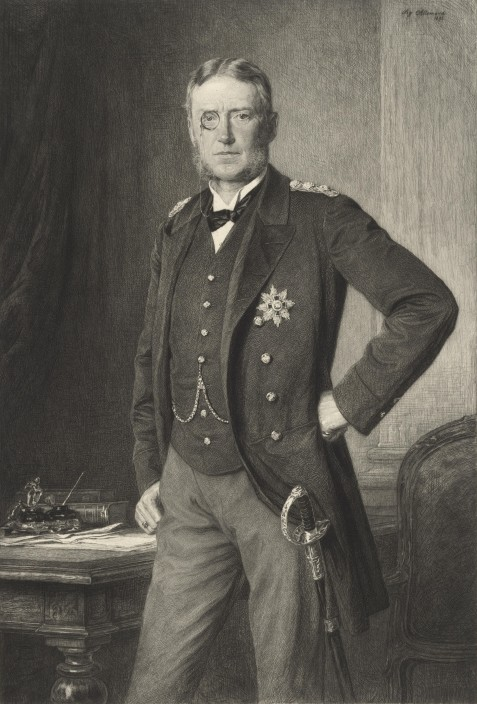
- Franz, Prince of Thun and Hohenstein (1893)

Minister-President of Austria
- In office 5 March 1898 – 2 October 1899
- Monarch: Franz Joseph I
- Preceded by: Paul Gautsch von Frankenthurn
- Succeeded by: Manfred von Clary-Aldringen

Personal details
- Born: 2 September 1847 Děčín, Kingdom of Bohemia, Austrian Empire
- Died: 1 November 1916 (aged 69) Děčín, Kingdom of Bohemia, Austria-Hungary

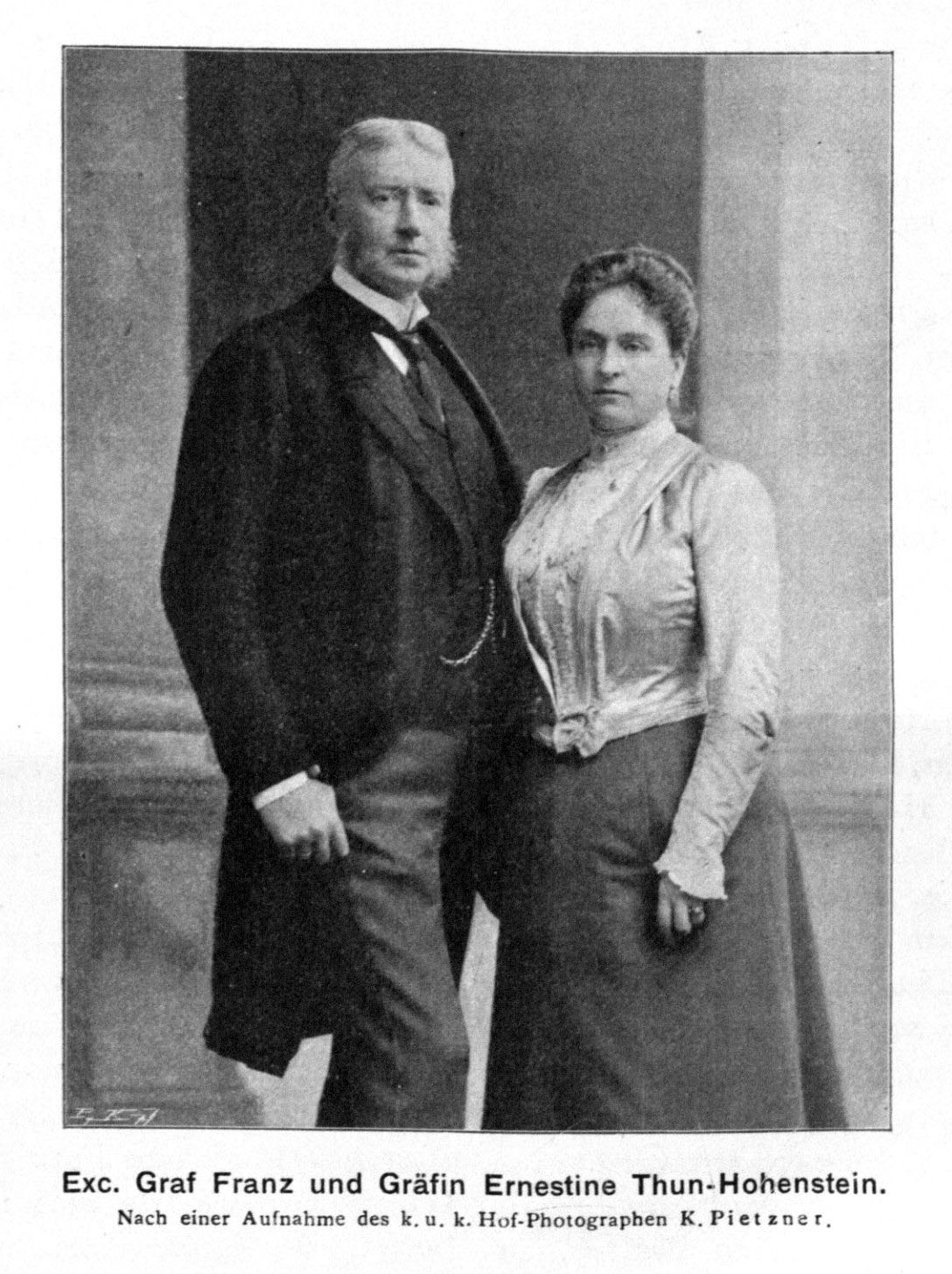
Franz with his second wife, Ernestine

Prince Franz Anton von Thun und Hohenstein (Czech: kníže František Antonín z Thunu a Hohensteina; 2 September 1847 in Děčín, Bohemia – 1 November 1916 in Děčín, Bohemia) was an Austro-Hungarian nobleman and a statesman.

He served as the Habsburg monarchy's Governor of his native Bohemia from 1889 to 1896 and again from 1911 to 1915. He was also briefly the 15th Minister-President of Austria and Minister of the Interior from 1898 to 1899.

== Biography ==
Franz was born as the second child and eldest son of Count Friedrich Franz von Thun und Hohenstein (1810-1881) and Countess Leopoldine von Lamberg (1825-1902).

Like most members of an old House of Thun und Hohenstein, he belonged to the Federalist party, and his appointment in 1889 as governor of Bohemia was the cause of grave dissatisfaction to the German Austrians. He took a leading part in the negotiation of 1890 for the Bohemian settlement, but the elections of 1891, in which the Young Czechs who were opposed to the feudal party gained a decisive victory, made his position a very difficult one. Contrary to expectation, he showed great energy in suppressing disorder; but after the proclamation of a state of siege his position became untenable, and in 1895 he had to resign. On the resignation of Badeni in 1898 he was made minister president, an office which he held for little more than a year. Although he succeeded in bringing to a conclusion the negotiations with Hungary, the support he gave to the Czechs and Slovenians increased the opposition of the Germans to such a degree that parliamentary government became impossible, and at the end of 1899 he was dismissed.

His sympathy towards the Czech people was responsible for a minor diplomatic spat between Austria-Hungary and the German Empire when the Prussian government deported some of its migrant Czech and Polish workers in 1899. The incident was part of an overall cooling of relations between the two empires at the end of the 19th century.

== Personal life ==
In 1874, he was firstly married in Prague to Princess Anna Maria Gabriela of Schwarzenberg (1854–1898), daughter of Karl III Prince of Schwarzenberg and his wife, Princess Wilhelmine of Oettingen-Wallerstein (1833-1910). The marriage remained childless. He married for the second time in 1901 to his distant cousin, Countess Ernestine Gabriele von Thun und Hohenstein (1858–1948), widow of Count Eugen Wratislaw of Mitrovic (1855–1897). She was daughter of Count Joseph Oswald von Thun und Hohenstein (1817-1883) and his wife, Altgräfin Johanna of Salm-Reifferscheidt-Bedburg (1827-1892). They had one daughter, Countess Anna Maria Wilhelmine (1903–1943), who married her first cousin once removed, Baron Wolfgang von Thienen-Adlerflycht (1896–1942) and got Castle Neuhaus near Salzburg as a wedding present.

Thun was rumoured to seek extramarital affairs in the circles of Prague National Theatre. He was very unpopular among Czech patriots and they often slandered him but there are allusions to his adventures in many memoirs. He was said to be a lover and a patron of dancer Enrichetta Grimaldi and actress Maria Pospischil. Writer Viktor Dyk satirically described their liaison in his novel The Fingers of Habakkuk.

== Titles and honours ==
=== Titles ===
He was raised to Princely rank by Emperor Franz Joseph I of Austria on 19 July 1911. As he had only one daughter, upon his death in 1916 the Princely title was inherited by his brother, Prince Jaroslav von Thun und Hohenstein (1864–1929), uncle and legal guardian of the Hohenbergs, children of the murdered Archduke Franz Ferdinand of Austria and his morganatic wife, Sophie, Duchess of Hohenberg, who was sister of Jaroslav's wife Countess Maria Pia Chotek von Wognin (1863-1905).

=== Orders and decorations ===
- (Austrian Empire) (Kingdom of Hungary) Austria-Hungary:
  - Grand Cross of the Imperial Order of Leopold, 1891
  - Knight of the Golden Fleece, 1896
  - Grand Cross of the Royal Hungarian Order of St. Stephen, 1899; in Diamonds, 1915
- Belgium: Officer of the Order of Leopold
- Holy See:
  - Grand Cross of the Order of Pope Pius IX
  - Grand Cross of St. Gregory the Great
- (Principality of Schaumburg-Lippe) Lippe: Cross of Honour of the House Order of Lippe, 1st Class
- Sovereign Military Order of Malta: Grand Cross of Honour and Devotion
- Russian Empire: Knight of St. Alexander Nevsky
- Spain: Grand Cross of the Order of Charles III, with Collar, 5 May 1906
