= Count Richard Belcredi =

Austrian civil servant and statesman

Hochgeboren Richard Graf von Belcredi
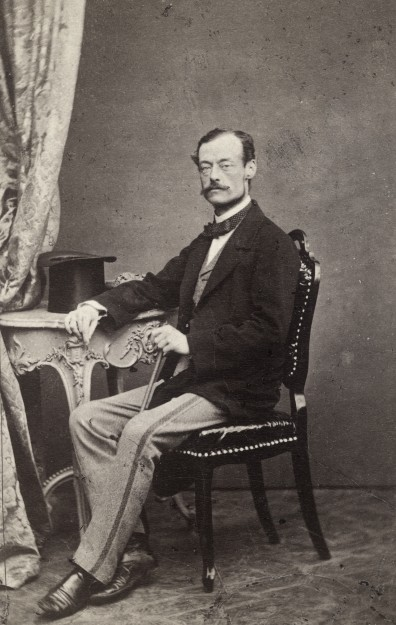
- Count Richard Belcredi

5th Chairman of the Ministers' Conference of the Austrian Empire
- In office 27 July 1865 – 7 February 1867
- Monarch: Franz Joseph I
- Preceded by: Alexander Graf von Mensdorff-Pouilly
- Succeeded by: Friedrich Ferdinand Graf von Beust

Interior Minister of the Austrian Empire
- In office 27 July 1865 – 7 February 1867
- Preceded by: Anton von Schmerling
- Succeeded by: Friedrich Ferdinand Graf von Beust

Personal details
- Born: 12 February 1823 Jimramov, Moravia, Austrian Empire
- Died: 2 December 1902 (aged 79) Gmunden, Upper Austria, Austria-Hungary

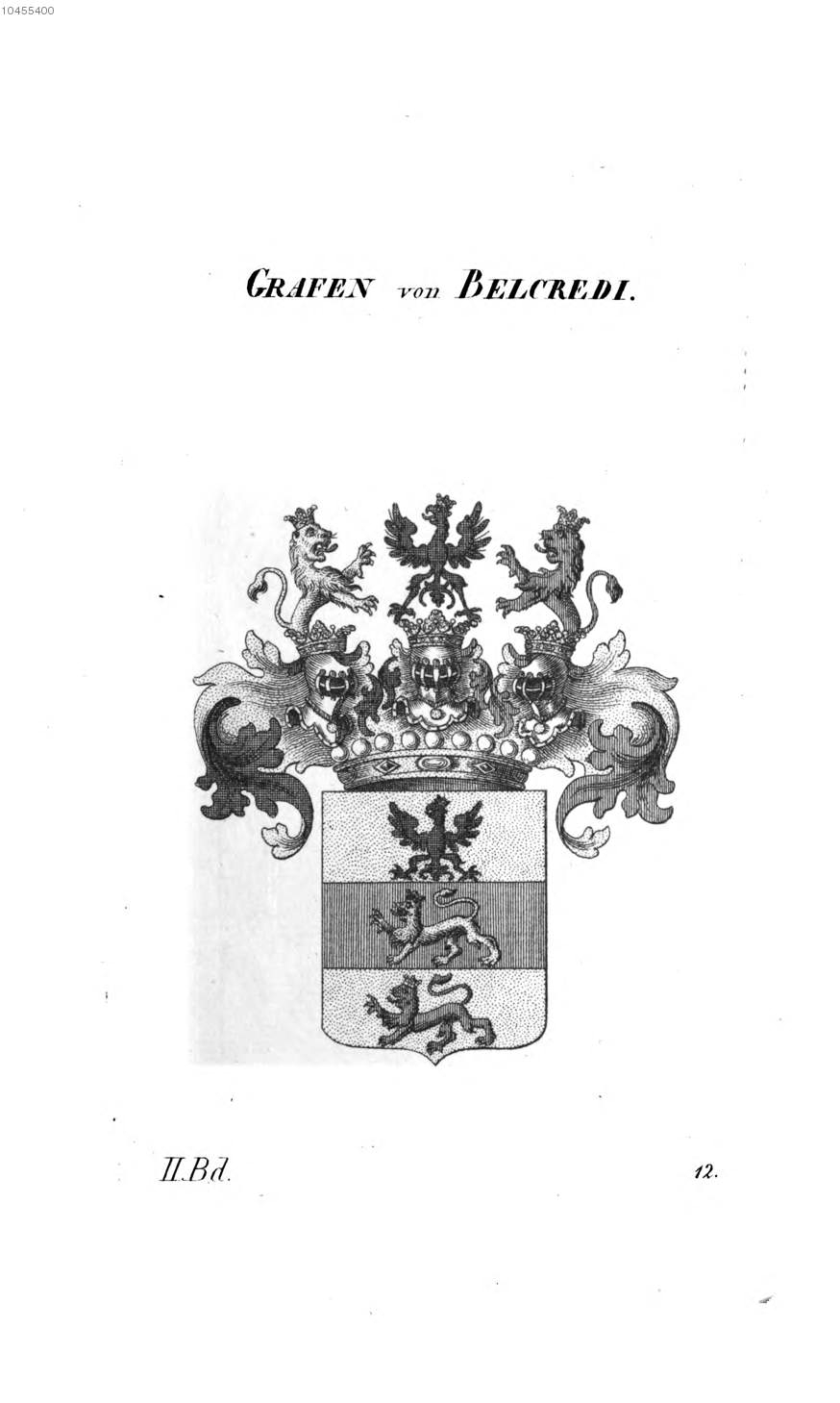
Arms of the Count von Belcredi

Count Richard von Belcredi (German: Richard Graf Belcredi; 12 February 1823 – 2 December 1902) was an Austrian civil servant and statesman, who served as Minister-President (and 'Minister of State') of the Austrian Empire from 1865 to 1867. During 1881–1895, Belcredi was President of the Cisleithanian Administrative Court.

== Early life and ancestry ==
Richard Graf von Belcredi was born on 12 February 1823, in Jimramov (Ingrowitz), in the Margraviate of Moravia, the youngest son of Count Eduard von Belcredi (1786–1838) and his wife Countess Maria von Fünfkirchen (1790–1860). He had one sister, Countess Almeria (1819-1914), who married Prince Hugo Maximilian von Thurn und Taxis (1817-1889). The Belcredi noble family originally descended from Lombardy, where they had been vested with the estates of Montalto Pavese by the Sforza dukes of Milan. Count Richard's ancestors settled in Moravia from 1769 onwards.

He studied law at the universities of Prague and Vienna; in 1854, he was appointed district captain (Bezirkshauptmann) in Znojmo (Znaim). In 1861, he was elected member of the Landtag diet of Austrian Silesia and MP of the Imperial Council. He became head of the Austrian Silesian regional government one year later. In 1864, he was promoted to the official rank of Geheimrat (Secret Councillor) and appointed Imperial-Royal governor of Bohemia in Prague.

== Three Count Ministry ==
In February 1865, Count Richard Belcredi, as the Austrian minister of state, convened a meeting of Viennese bankers to find ways to finance projects. In June 1865, Emperor Franz Josef I chose Belcredi, a declared Conservative, to become Prime Minister and Minister of State, replacing the government of Archduke Rainer Ferdinand of Austria and Anton von Schmerling, who had resigned after failure in his Liberal centralizing policies. Belcredi accepted his nomination, by his own accounts only from a sense of duty. His cabinet was called the "Three Count Ministry" although, actually, four counts were in charge: Minister President Belcredi himself, Alexander von Mensdorff-Pouilly as foreign minister, Johann Larisch von Moennich as finance minister, and Moritz Esterházy de Galantha as a minister without portfolio.

The Austrian government had to face the rising "Hungarian question", that eventually led to the Austro-Hungarian Compromise of 1867. On 20 September 1865, Belcredi had the 1861 February Patent suspended. Against delaying actions by Belcredi, the Compromise was achieved after the Austrian defeat in the Austro-Prussian War and the 1866 Peace of Prague, ending the monarchy's membership in the German Confederation. On October 30, Foreign Minister Mensdorff-Pouilly was succeeded by Friedrich Ferdinand von Beust who conducted the negotiations with Hungary and prepared a draft for the Cisleithanian December Constitution.

Beust's concept of a Dual Monarchy finally prevailed against Belcredi's plans to implement a federation of the Austrian crown lands, similar to later proposals of United States of Greater Austria. On 7 February 1867, Belcredi handed in his resignation. In 1881 he was appointed president of the Imperial-Royal Administrative Court and life member of the Austrian House of Lords.

== Orders and decorations ==
- Austrian Empire:
  - Grand Cross of the Royal Hungarian Order of St. Stephen, 1867
  - Knight of the Order of the Golden Fleece, 1878
- Kingdom of Prussia: Knight of the Royal Order of the Crown, 1st Class, 29 July 1864

== Notes ==
Preceded by Alexander von Mensdorff-Pouilly	Chairman of the Ministers' Conference of the Austrian Empire; 1865–1867	Succeeded by Friedrich Ferdinand von Beust
Preceded by Anton von Schmerling	Interior Minister of the Austrian Empire; 1865–1867	Succeeded by Friedrich Ferdinand von Beust
