= Joachim von Beust =

German lawyer and legal author

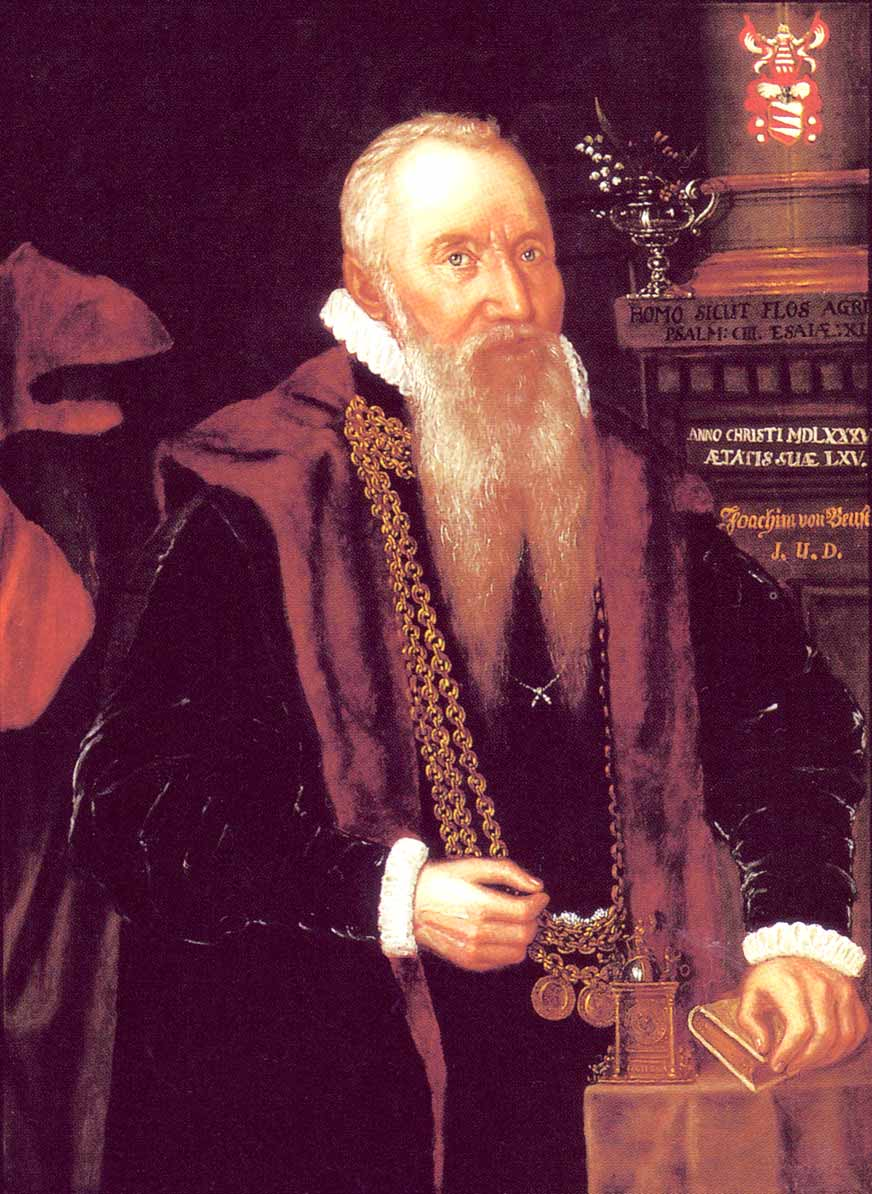
- Portrait of Joachim von Beust at the Lutherhaus Museum in Wittenberg.
- Born: Mockern
- Occupation: Lawyer
- Known for: The Saxon Protestant Marriage Law.

Joachim von Beust (1522–1597) was a 16th-century German lawyer and legal author.

His most important contribution was in 1586 when he wrote the Saxon Protestant Marriage Law.

== Life ==
He was born in Mockern near Magdeburg on 19 April 1522 the eldest son of Captain Joachim (Achim) von Beust. The family had major estates in the stendal district. From 1539, he began studying Law and the Liberal Arts at the University of Leipzig. In Leipzig he first encountered Martin Luther and came under his influence. In 1544, he went to Italy at the invitation of Modestinus Pistoris. In 1547, he did further studies in Law at the University of Bologna.

In 1550, Elector Moritz appointed him as a councillor in Wittenberg, also creating him a Professor of Law at Wittenberg University. From 1553 Elector August also used him for diplomatic purposes.

In 1580, he bought a manor at Planitz near Zwickau. In the 1590s he was involved in various ecclesiastical disputes.

He died in Planitz on 4 February 1597.

== Family ==
In 1556, he married Barbara Brandt of Lindau at Wiesenburg. Only one son is known, Heinrich von Beust (b.1559).

== Publications ==
- Tractatus de Spons et matrim
