= Bohemian Club (Chicago) =

Club in Chicago founded by Czech elite

The Bohemian Club (Czech: Česká beseda) is a club founded in 1899 that was frequented by Chicago's Czech elite, as well as the visiting elite from Czechoslovakia. The club was used as a place to share Czech culture, drama, music and literature.

It was visited by numerous well-known people of Bohemian descent, such as Anton Cermak, Rudolf Friml, George Halas and Otto Kerner Jr. It also served as host to Tomáš Garrigue Masaryk, the founder and first President of Czechoslovakia. It is active in the west suburbs of Chicago to this day.
