= Federalist Party (Austria) =

Federalist Party Föderalistischepartei
- Leader: Count Karl Sigmund von Hohenwart; Eduard Taaffe
- Founded: 1861
- Dissolved: 1907
- Merged into: Christian Social Party (Austria)
- Headquarters: Vienna
- Ideology: Christian Democracy; Protectionism; National conservatism Federalism

The Federalist Party (German: Föderalistische Partei), was less of a party in the traditional sense, than a coalition of various independent politicians, conservatives, and ethnic minority parties, dedicated to the Habsburg monarchy, and the federalization of Cis-Leithanian, i.e. Austrian-dominated, part of the Austrian-Hungarian Dual monarchy.

The party was primarily supported by the Church, the German upper class, and ethnic minorities within the Austrian dominated section of the empire, in particular the Polish speaking population. The politics of the Federal party were staunchly Conservative and anti-liberal, in social, economic and political spheres. It sought to preserve the monarchy and the established order through federalization, bringing the Slavs equality relative to their fellow German citizens, constitutionally and socially. Gradually, thanks to failures in efforts towards federalization, and the growing consciousness and nationalism of the Slavs within the Empire, the party began to disintegrate. It was unable to compete for Conservative and Federalist inclined middle and lower class voters, and lost ground to the rising Christian Social Party (Austria). Upon the introduction of General suffrage in 1907, the remains of the Federalist party merged into the Christian Social party, giving it a distinctly more Conservative character.

== See also ==
- National Constitution Party

== Notes and references ==
- Kwan, Jonathan (2013). Liberalism and the Habsburg Monarchy, 1861-1895. Palgrave Macmillan.
