= National liberalism =

Liberalism combined with elements of nationalism

National liberalism is a variant of liberalism, combining liberal policies and issues with elements of nationalism. Historically, national liberalism has also been used in the same meaning as conservative liberalism (right-liberalism).

A series of "national-liberal" political parties, by ideology or just by name, were especially active in Europe in the 19th century in several national contexts such as Central Europe, the Nordic countries, and Southeastern Europe.

== Definitions ==
National liberalism was mainly a 19th-century ideology and a movement.

National liberal goals were the pursuit of individual and economic freedom and national sovereignty. József Antall, a historian and Christian democrat who served as the first post-communist Prime Minister of Hungary, described national liberalism as "part and parcel of the emergence of the nation state" in 19th-century Europe.

According to Oskar Mulej, "in terms of both ideologies and political party traditions it may be argued that in the Central European lands a distinct type of liberalism, peculiar to this region evolved through the nineteenth century" and citing Maciej Janowski, "the word 'national' acted as more or less synonymous with 'liberal'" ("'national' alone was sufficient to arouse suspicions of liberal associations"). Also according to Mulej, in Southeast Europe "'national liberals' also played visible if not central roles, but with rather different, region-specific characteristics, which to a considerable extent distinguished them from their Central European counterparts."

Lind himself defines national liberalism as uniting "moderate social conservatism with moderate economic liberalism".

Gordon Smith, a leading scholar of comparative European politics, understands national liberalism as a political concept that lost popularity when the success of nationalist movements in creating nation states rendered it no longer necessary to specify that a liberal ideal, party or politician was "national".

== History ==
The roots of national liberalism are to be found in the 19th century, when conservative liberalism and/or classical liberalism was the ideology of the political classes in most European countries and in particular those of Central Europe, then governed by hereditary monarchies.

At their origin, national liberals, although pro-business, were not necessarily advocates of free trade and economic liberalism per se and sometimes favoured cooperation between the government and the national industry, moderate levels of protectionism, the establishment of preferential custom unions, subsidies for infant industry or companies considered of national strategic importance and various forms of industrial planning.

National liberalism was popular in a number of countries including Germany, Austria, Denmark, Sweden, Finland and Romania during the 19th century. In Germany, Austria and Romania, national liberals and/or "National Liberal" parties were long in government. More specifically, in German-speaking countries national liberals were also in favour of a more authoritarian or conservative political regime because of the multi-ethnic character or heterogeneous nature of countries like the Austrian Empire (later officially renamed Austria-Hungary) or the newly created Germany under Chancellor Otto von Bismarck.

=== Austria ===
In Austria-Hungary, the Constitutional Party was the main representative of national liberalism. In Austria, national liberalism has remained the basis of one of the three Lager, or ideological camps, in the country, dating back to the Revolutions of 1848 in the Austrian Empire. During the interwar period, the national-liberal camp was gathered into the Greater German People's Party. By 1938, with the Anschluss of Austria into Nazi Germany, the national-liberal camp had been swallowed whole by Austrian National Socialism and all other parties were eventually absorbed into Nazi totalitarianism. Both Socialists and Christian Socials were persecuted under the Nazi regime and the national-liberal camp was scarred after the war due to guilt by association with National Socialism.

In 1949, the Federation of Independents (VdU) was founded as a national-liberal alternative to the main Austrian parties. It incorporated an array of political movements, including free market liberals, populists, former Nazis and German nationalists, all of whom had been unable to join either of the two main parties. The VdU evolved into the Freedom Party of Austria (FPÖ) in 1955–1956. When Jörg Haider was chosen as new FPÖ leader in 1986, the party started an ideological turn towards right-wing populism, which resulted in the split of most liberals, who formed the Liberal Forum (LiF), which took over the FPÖ's membership in the Liberal International and would later eventually merge into NEOS. Haider himself would split from the party and form the Alliance for the Future of Austria in 2005.

=== Bulgaria ===
In Bulgaria the National Liberal Party (NLP) was a political party founded in 1920 by a merger of the Liberal Party (Radoslavists), the People's Liberal Party and the Young Liberals Party. The party has won several seats in some elections including the November 1923 elections and 1927 elections. A party named National Liberal Party 'Stefan Stambolov' was established after the fall of the communist regime, and was part of the Coalition for Bulgaria alliance in the 1991 parliamentary elections.

=== Czech Republic ===
In Austria-Hungary the Young Czech Party, emerged in 1874 after a split from the Old Czech Party, was a national-liberal force. During Czechoslovakia's era (1918–1992), a few parties were described as national-liberal: Czechoslovak National Democracy, the National Labour Party and, after 1989, the Czech National Social Party.

Today, the conservative Civic Democratic Party (ODS) in the Czech Republic has been described as a national-liberal party. The ODS is a member of the Alliance of Conservatives and Reformists in Europe, as Slovakia's Freedom and Solidarity, and the International Democrat Union.

=== Denmark ===
In Denmark, from the 1830s the core concept of national liberalism was that the nation and the state should have the same extent. National liberals supported the union the Kingdom of Denmark and the Duchy of Schleswig under a common constitutional framework. On the economy, the state should not interfere with trade and the national-liberal economic vision was transposed in the 1857 Law on Freedom of Business, which abolished the last remnants of the feudal monopolies which had previously formed the framework for the craft of the cities. Danish national liberals supported Scandinavism and thus Scandinavian unity.

=== Egypt ===
In 1919 the Wafd Party was founded by Egyptian nationalist leader Saad Zaghloul. The Wafd Party led the 1919 Egyptian revolution against British colonial rule in Egypt, resulting in the Unilateral Declaration of Egyptian Independence and the founding of the Kingdom of Egypt, as well as writing of the Egyptian Constitution of 1923, which created a bicameral, parliamentary democratic, constitutional monarchy. The Wafd Party was dissolved by Gamal Abdel Nasser's Free Officers movement after the 1952 Egyptian revolution.

The New Wafd Party, A.K.A. the Egyptian Wafd Party was founded in 1978 by Fouad Serageddin after Anwar Sadat increased political liberalization in Egypt. They sought to form an opposition bloc with the Egyptian Muslim Brotherhood in the 1984 general election, but only won 15%. The Egyptian Wafd Party was active in the 2011 Egyptian revolution. They have been represented in the Egyptian Senate and Egyptian House of Representatives since the 2011-12 elections.

=== Finland ===
In the Grand Duchy of Finland, an autonomous part of the Russian Empire, where as many as 80% of the population was Protestant and Finnish-speaking, somewhat under 20% Protestant Swedish speakers (Sweden ruled Finland until 1809) and a small number Russian Orthodox, the term "national liberal" was used by the elite Swedish-speakers of the Svecoman movement who advocated liberal ideals, but wanted to keep Swedish as the dominant language, an idea opposed by the Finnish-speaking nationalists of the Fennoman movement. The Svecoman movement gave birth to the Swedish Party, which was later renamed Swedish People's Party in Finland, which has since moved to mainstream liberalism and social liberalism and is often a party of government in the country. Finns Party Youth described its economic policy with that term.

=== France ===
The main representatives are the think-tank Carrefour de l'Horloge preceded by Cercle Pareto created in 1968 by Yvan Blot which was related with the GRECE, and the National-Liberal Party both directed by Henry de Lesquen.

=== Germany ===
In Germany, "national-liberal" was widely used in a similar sense to "right-liberal".

In 19th-century Germany, believers in national liberalism differed from liberal nationalists in that they believed in a more authoritarian presence in Europe and a strong German Empire. Liberal nationalists, such as Max Weber, were looking towards a democratic Germany in cooperation with the other European powers.

At the time of the German Empire, national liberalism was represented by the National Liberal Party (NLP), the largest in the Reichstag for several years. National Liberals supported Bismarck, who served as Chancellor from 1871 (unification of Germany) to 1890, until the late 1870s when the Chancellor reversed his early free trade policies, became a proponent of protectionism, opposed increasing parliamentary powers and ultimately pandered for the support of the German Conservative Party (largely representing the wealthy landowning elite Junkers of Prussia). Additionally, the NLP (which had obtained around 30% in the first three federal elections, including 30.1% in the 1871 federal election) suffered huge losses in the 1878 federal election and especially the 1881 federal election (when it was reduced to 14.6%). Later, the party experienced a steady decline in its share of vote, contextually with the rise of the Social Democratic Party and the Centre Party at the turn of the century.

During the Weimar Republic, the NLP was succeeded by the German People's Party (DVP), whose main leader was Gustav Stresemann, Chancellor (1923) and Minister of Foreign Affairs (1923–1929). The DVP, which was joined by some moderate elements of the Free Conservative Party (FKP) and the Economic Union (WV), was generally thought to represent the interests of the great German industrialists and has been classified as a national-liberal party by several observers. Its platform stressed Christian family values, secular education, lower tariffs, opposition to welfare spending and agrarian subsidies and hostility to "Marxism" (that is to say, both the Communist Party and the Social Democratic Party). After Stresemann's death, the DVP, whose ranks included several anti-republicans, veered sharply to the right.

The current Free Democratic Party (FDP), which was the joint successor of the DVP and the social liberal German Democratic Party (DDP), originally featured conservative and partly nationalist efforts, which were particularly strong in some state associations until the 1950s and more occasionally after that (For example Jürgen Möllemann, FDP leader in North Rhine-Westphalia in 1983–1994 and 1996–2002) and still includes a national-liberal faction, which holds a consistently Eurosceptic position, differently from the rest of the party. Some right-wing elements, including Sven Tritschler (former leader of the Stresemann Club), have more recently joined the Alternative for Germany (AfD), which has in turn been characterised by some observers as national liberal.

=== Hungary ===
József Antall was the first democratically elected Prime Minister of Hungary as a member of the Hungarian Democratic Forum. Antall played a major role of in bringing Hungary closer to the Western Bloc, as well bringing down the Warsaw Pact. Antall promoted both economic liberalization, while appealing to the right-wing populist fringe of his party by discussing the "national issue" of Hungarians living outside of Hungary and Hungarian irredentism (see also Székely autonomy movement). All of this coincided with the End of communism in Hungary and the country's democratisation and decommunisation, something Antall played a major role in promoting.

=== Israel ===
Since 1973, Likud – National Liberal Movement operates in Israel as the main right-wing and Zionist political party in the country. It historically based its ideology upon the national liberal principles of Ze'ev Jabotinsky, known as Revisionist Zionism. This has led to a combination of liberal policies (such as free market economics in Israel) and nationalist policies (such as vaguely supporting some idea of Greater Israel and an Israeli one-state solution).

In recent years, other national liberal parties in Israel (such as Yisrael Beiteinu, National Unity, New Hope, and Derekh Eretz) that have either explicitly or implicitly supported a two-state solution, albeit not necessarily based upon the 1949 Armistice border. The main exception to this is Derekh Eretz, which can best be described as a center-right, moderately conservative pro-peace party. Even still, Derekh Eretz falls strongly within the national liberal politics of Israel, given its support for Zionism and promotion of a secular, free market, democratic, and Jewish Israel.

=== South Korea ===
In South Korea during the reign of Syngman Rhee, various movements sought to move away from Rhee's dictatorial, conservative, and quasi-fascist governance (at least at the beginning of the First Republic) and towards a more liberal and democratic society. This included the Democratic Party, usually considered the main opposition to Syngman Rhee's Liberal Party. The Democratic Party often synthesized nationalist support for the state of South Korea with liberalism to form a kind of South Korean national liberalism. Slowly the party would gain more prominence within the South Korean political scene. In the 1958 South Korean legislative election, the Democratic Party won 79 seats, making it second to the ruling Liberal Party. During the first democratic elections in 1960 during the short lived Second Republic of Korea, Yun Po-sun, lifelong anti-communist, democracy advocate, and ideological national liberal, won under the Democratic Party banner. However, his reign was not to be. Factionalism, division, and economic instability defined the Second Republic, including within the South Korean army. Within a year, Yun Po-sun and his Democratic Party were ousted by military leaders Park Chung Hee and Chang Do-yong, the former of whom would become dictator during the Third Republic of Korea.

=== Lebanon ===
The National Liberal Party was founded in 1958 by Camille Chamoun with a pro-British, and anti-French foreign policy along with free enterprise, democracy, and nonsectarianism. During the Lebanese Civil War, the National Liberal Party had a military wing, the Tigers Militia, which was allied with the Lebanese Front and Lebanese Forces. As a result it has maintained close relations with the Lebanese Forces party today. In 2005, the National Liberal Party opposed Syrian occupation and was part of the Qornet Shehwan Gathering.

=== Romania ===
In Romania, the National Liberal Party (PNL), which was initially established in 1875, re-incorporated in 1990, and subsequently enlarged in 2014 (when it absorbed the Democratic Liberal Party, PDL), has also been part of the national-liberal tradition. Nowadays, it is one of the country's main parties. Former Romanian President Klaus Iohannis (2014–2025) stemmed from it. Currently, in terms of political ideology, the PNL is mainly liberal-conservative and pro-European, therefore placed on the centre-right of the political spectrum concerning economy, society, culture, freedom of expression, and civil liberties.

=== Russia ===
In Russia, "national liberalism" was a 1990s movement claiming to be redefining "liberal" principles as understood in the Western tradition to produce a "national liberalism" better suited to Russian culture, being practically a variety of Russian nationalism.

=== Sweden ===
In Sweden, in the 1860s liberals described themselves as national liberals (nationalliberaler) and constituted a coalition of monarchists and liberal reformists in support of parliamentary reforms. Swedish national liberals also supported Scandinavism.

=== Syria ===
During the Second Syrian Republic, the National Bloc, which advocated Syrian independence from the French Mandate, split into two political parties: one was the conservative, Arab nationalist, pan-syrian, irredentist, anti-Western, and anti-Hashemite/pro-republican National Party; the other was the national liberal, Syrian nationalist, Hashemite monarchist, constitutional monarchist, and pro-West People's Party.

== Other uses ==
Several political parties have included "national liberal" in their names or ideology. A list is available at National Liberal Party.

== Parties and organisations ==
=== National liberal parties or factions ===
- Armenia: Ramgavar, United Liberal National Party
- Austria: Freedom Party of Austria, Alliance for the Future of Austria
- Azerbaijan: Republican Alternative Party
- Belgium: VLOTT, Libertair, Direct, Democratisch
- Brazil: Mission
- Denmark: Progress Party, New Right
- Egypt: Egyptian Wafd Party, For the Love of Egypt (coalition), Nation's Future Party (disputed)
- Estonia: Estonian Reform Party
- France: National-Liberal Party
- Germany: Free Democratic Party (factions), Alternative for Germany
- Greece: Union of Centrists, Recreate Greece
- Israel: Likud, New Hope, Yisrael Beiteinu, Derekh Eretz
- Italy: Italian Liberal Right
- Kuwait: National Democratic Alliance
- Lebanon National Liberal Party
- Lithuania: Freedom and Justice
- Montenegro: Liberal Party of Montenegro
- Netherlands: Belang van Nederland, Forza! Nederland, FvD, JA21, Otten Group, Trots op Nederland, Party for Freedom
- Norway: Progress Party
- Poland: Confederation Liberty and Independence
- Romania: National Liberal Party, Force of the Right
- South Korea: Dawn of Liberty Party
- Spain: Citizens
- Ukraine: Our Ukraine
- United Kingdom: National Liberal Party

=== Historical parties or factions ===
- Austria: Deutschfreiheitliche Partei, Carinthian Farmers' Association, Democratic Association of Cities, German Freedom and Order Party, German Peoples' Election Committee, Liberal Corporate Association of Salzburg, Styrian Farmers' Party, Landbund, Greater German People's Party, Federation of Independents, Freedom Party of South Tyrol
- Bulgaria: National Liberal Party
- Cuba: National Liberal Party of Cuba
- Czech Republic: Young Czech Party
- Czechoslovakia: Czechoslovak National Democracy
- Denmark: National Liberal Party
- Dominican Republic: Blue Party
- East Germany: National Democratic Party of Germany
- Egypt: Wafd Party
- Estonia: Estonian People's Party
- Finland: Finns Party Youth
- France: Front National, Movement for France
- Germany: National Liberal Party, Imperial Liberal Party, German People's Party, German State Party, German Freedom Party
- Guatemala: National Change Union
- Hawaii: National Liberal Party
- Hungary: Opposition Party, Resolution Party, Address Party, Deák Party, Left Centre, Liberal Party, Party of Independence and '48, National Constitution Party, National Party of Work, National Democratic Party, Civic Freedom Party, National Civic Party, Civic Democratic Party, Hungarian Democratic Forum
- Japan: Shimpotō, Kenseitō
- Lebanon: Constitutional Bloc
- Montenegro: Montenegrin
- Netherlands: Pim Fortuyn List
- Norway: Free-minded Liberal Party
- Romania: Free and Independent Faction, National Liberal Party, Romanian National Party, Democratic Peasants' Party, Vlad Țepeș League
- South Korea: Korea Democratic Party, National Independence Federation, Democratic Party, People Party
- Sweden: Progress Party, New Democracy
- Syria: People's Party
- United Kingdom: National Liberal Party (1922), National Liberal Party (1931)
- United States: National Democratic Party

== See also ==
- Civic nationalism
- Classical liberalism
- Liberal corporatism
- Protectionism
