= Otto Bauer =

Austrian socialist politician (1881–1938)

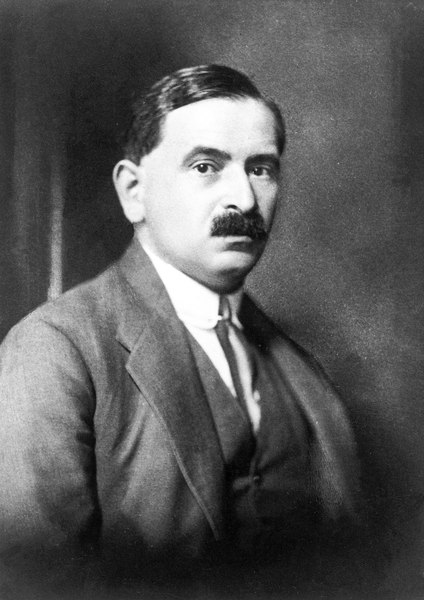
- Bauer c. 1920

Foreign Minister of Austria
- In office 21 November 1918 – 26 July 1919
- Chancellor: Karl Renner
- Preceded by: Victor Adler
- Succeeded by: Karl Renner

Personal details
- Born: 5 September 1881 Vienna, Austria-Hungary
- Died: 4 July 1938 (aged 56) Paris, France
- Party: Social Democratic Workers' Party of Austria (SDAP)
- Education: University of Vienna

Military service
- Branch/service: Austro-Hungarian Army (1902–1918)
- Rank: First lieutenant (Reserve)

Otto Bauer (German: [ˈbaʊɐ]; 5 September 1881 – 4 July 1938) was an Austrian politician who was one of the founders and leading thinkers of the Austromarxists who sought a middle ground between social democracy and revolutionary socialism. He was a member of the Austrian Parliament from 1907 to 1934, deputy party leader of the Social Democratic Workers' Party (SDAP) from 1918 to 1934, and Foreign Minister of the Republic of German-Austria in 1918 and 1919. In the latter position, he worked unsuccessfully to bring about the unification of Austria and the Weimar Republic. His opposition to the SDAP joining coalition governments after it lost its leading position in Parliament in 1920 and his practice of advising the party to wait for the proper historical circumstances before taking action were criticized by some for facilitating Austria's move from democracy to fascism in the 1930s. When the SDAP was outlawed by Chancellor Kurt Schuschnigg in 1934, Bauer went into exile, where he continued to work for Austrian socialism until his death.

== Education and military training ==
Otto Bauer was born in Vienna, son of the wealthy, politically liberal Jewish textile manufacturer Philipp (Filipp) Bauer and Katharina (Käthe) Bauer, née Gerber. He completed elementary school in Vienna, and high school in Vienna, Meran and Reichenberg (the latter two at the time part of Austria-Hungary). In addition to German, he spoke English, French and, after his years as a prisoner of war, Russian. To fulfill his compulsory military duty, he enlisted as a one-year volunteer with the 3rd Regiment of the Tyrolean Rifle Regiment in 1902, completed his active military service after passing the reserve officer exam, and was transferred as a reservist to the Infantry Regiment Frederik VIII King of Denmark, No. 75. He went on to study law at the University of Vienna and received his doctorate in 1906. His political interests were reflected in his university studies, where in addition to law, history, languages and philosophy, he enrolled in classes in national economics and sociology.

In 1900 Bauer began to be politically active in the Social Democratic Workers' Party, as the Social Democratic Party of Austria (SPÖ) was called before 1945, and became a member of the Free Association of Socialist Students. At the university he met the somewhat older Socialist Party members Max Adler, Rudolf Hilferding (who later became a minister of finance in the Weimar Republic) and Karl Renner, who was Chancellor of Austria immediately after both the First and Second World Wars. With them he founded the association Zukunft ('Future') as a school for Viennese workers that was the nucleus for Austromarxism. He attracted attention when in 1907, at only 26 years old, he published the 600-page work Nationalitätenfrage und Sozialdemokratie ('The Nationality Question and Social Democracy'). In it he attempted to apply the principles of cultural autonomy to find a constructive solution to the problem of nationality, which was particularly important to the Austro-Hungarian Empire because of its many nationalities.

== Political career ==
=== Empire and World War I (1907–1918) ===
==== Member of Parliament ====
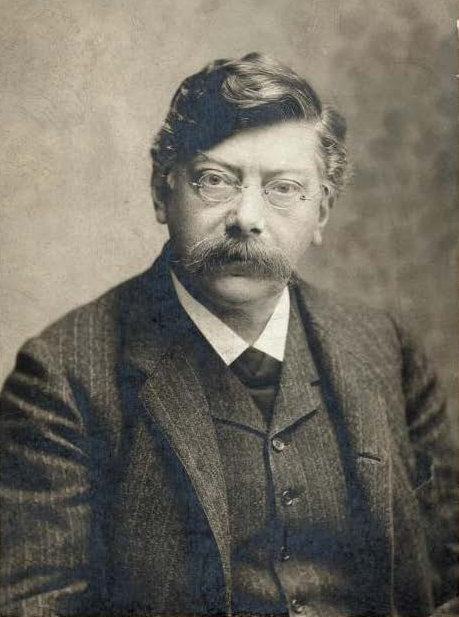
Victor Adler

In the 1907 legislative election, the House of Deputies (Abgeordnetenhaus) of the Imperial Council (Reichsrat) was elected for the first time under universal and equal male suffrage. The SDAP, which had been represented in Parliament for the first time in 1897 with 14 deputies, won 87 seats, the second strongest showing behind the conservative Christian Social Party. Otto Bauer entered the House of Deputies in the 1907 election and at the request of party leader Victor Adler became secretary of the Club of Social Democratic Deputies in the Reichsrat. In the years before World War I, Adler and the Social Democrats generally supported the existing state order.

In 1907 Bauer co-founded and until 1914 was editor of the Social Democratic monthly Der Kampf ('The Struggle'), of which he remained co-editor until 1934. From 1912 to 1914 he was also a member of the editorial board of the daily Arbeiter-Zeitung ('Workers' Newspaper'), the party's central journalistic voice. During his career as a journalist, Bauer wrote some 4,000 newspaper articles, and among the Social Democrats he proved himself to be an impressive speaker and convincing debater. The historian Friedrich Heer spoke of Bauer's "marriage of German and Jewish pathos".

In 1914 Bauer met and fell in love with Helene Landau (née Gumplowicz), a married academic and journalist who was ten years his senior. After she divorced her husband in 1920, the two were married in the Stadttempel, Vienna's main synagogue; a civil marriage was not legally possible at the time.

==== War service and captivity ====
In August 1914, at the beginning of World War I, Bauer was drafted as a reserve lieutenant of infantry. He took part as a platoon commander in the heavy fighting at Grodek (now Horodok, Ukraine), saved his company from being wiped out at the battle of Szysaki, for which he was awarded the Military Cross of Merit 3rd Class, and on 23 November 1914 was taken prisoner of war by the Russians during a "spirited" attack that he had ordered. As he wrote to fellow Social Democrat Karl Seitz, who sent him money through friends in Stockholm, he was able to work on a comprehensive theoretical treatise during his imprisonment in Siberia. He was also allowed to read Russian, English, and French newspapers due to his privileges as an officer, and he did not have to engage in physical labor.

As a result of intervention by the SDAP, Bauer was able to return to Vienna as an exchange invalid in September 1917, less than two months before the outbreak of the October Revolution in Russia. In February 1918 he was appointed first lieutenant in the reserves and in March placed on leave from active military service in order to work on the Arbeiter-Zeitung. He was formally in army service until 31 October 1918. His contacts with Menshevik functionaries while a prisoner of war had made him a staunch supporter of the "Marxist center" that the Mensheviks represented. In Austria, however, his views placed him among the left (Marxist) wing of the SDAP.

==== Rise to leadership in the SDAP ====
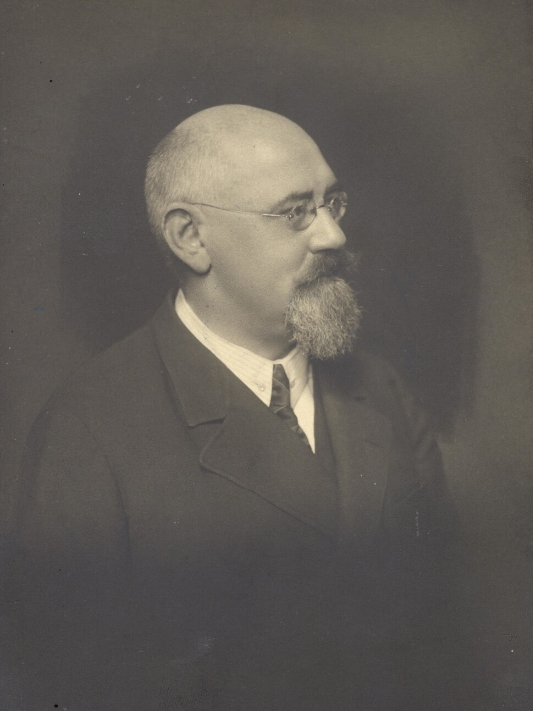
Karl Renner in 1920

The SDAP's left wing had gained in importance at the party congress in 1917 because the plight of the civilian population that was going hungry due to wartime food shortages. The assassination in the fall of 1916 of the unpopular imperial Minister President Karl von Stürgkh by Friedrich Adler, son of SDAP chairman Victor Adler, also spurred on the opponents of Burgfriedenspolitik, a political truce under which the parliamentary parties refrained from challenging the Empire's war policy. Following Stürgkh's assassination, the SDAP began increasingly to distance itself from the government's wartime course. The Russian October Revolution once again increased the importance of the left wing when it was assigned the task of preventing Austrian workers from moving over to the Bolsheviks.

After Victor Adler's death on 11 November 1918, the 37-year-old Otto Bauer, seen as the young and dynamic leader of the SDAP's left wing, was brought into the party's leadership. As a counterweight, the leader of the SDAP's right wing, Karl Renner, was given the position of Chancellor on 30 October 1918 in the first government of the new state of German-Austria, which declared itself both a republic and part of the German Republic on 12 November 1918.

=== Post-war (1918–1934) ===
==== Foreign Minister and the question of union with Germany ====
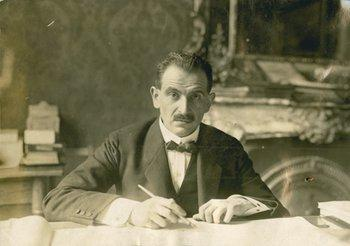
Bauer in 1919

On 12 November 1918 the party proposed that Bauer succeed Viktor Adler as Foreign Minister of German-Austria. He was then appointed to the position by the State Council (Staatsrat). In the election for the Constituent National Assembly on 16 February 1919, the SDAP won the largest percent of the vote (40.76%) and entered into a coalition with the Christian Social Party, which had come in ahead of the SDAP in the previous (1907) election.

After the end of the war, a union (Anschluss) between German-Austria, including German Bohemia, and Germany seemed a self-evident goal to many, especially urban Social Democrats who had seen their German political counterparts become the governing party in the Weimar Republic. Like other nationalities of the fallen monarchy, Austrian Germans claimed the right of national self-determination. In addition, the Austrian Social Democrats were expecting to see a socialist revolution take place in Germany. Otto Bauer was one of the most outspoken proponents of the belief in a future with Germany.

At the SDAP party congress on 31 October and 1 November 1918, Bauer stated that from the national standpoint as (cultural) Germans and from the international standpoint as Social Democrats, they must demand union with Germany. In Parliament he said that opponents of Austrian unification with Germany were high traitors to the nation. The Provisional National Assembly voted in favor of the union on 12 November 1918, and on 25 December Bauer addressed a note verbale to the victorious powers saying that union with Germany was the only and correct way forward.

He conducted confidential unification negotiations from 27 February to 2 March 1919 with German Foreign Minister Ulrich von Brockdorff-Rantzau, whose representatives in Austria warned internally against joining Germany with the small bankrupt state. In mid-April Bauer was advised by a British officer in Vienna to avoid the subject of unification as much as possible in the peace negotiations. Bauer did not inform his government colleagues of the warning until weeks later and initially nominated Franz Klein, who was known to be an ardent supporter of unification, as head of the delegation to the peace talks at St. Germain. As word of the British warning belatedly spread, the delegation leadership was transferred to Karl Renner before negotiations began.

On 7 May 1919 the Allies of World War I handed the German delegation at Versailles the draft of the peace treaty, which revealed that the victors would not permit Austria to unite with Germany. Since his policy of unification was considered to have failed, Bauer resigned from the government on 26 July 1919, and Chancellor Renner took over the Foreign Office. Bauer nevertheless remained a proponent of unification until 1933, stating later that "it was clear to every Social Democrat and every worker in Austria that we wanted unification with the German Republic, not Hitler's penal colony."

==== Early party work ====
From March to October 1919 Bauer served with Ignaz Seipel of the Christian Socialists on the socialization commission appointed by Parliament. Its most important result was the draft of the Works Councils Act passed by the National Assembly on 15 May 1919. The move towards socializing private enterprises, however, was quickly halted due to the divergent views of the coalition partners.

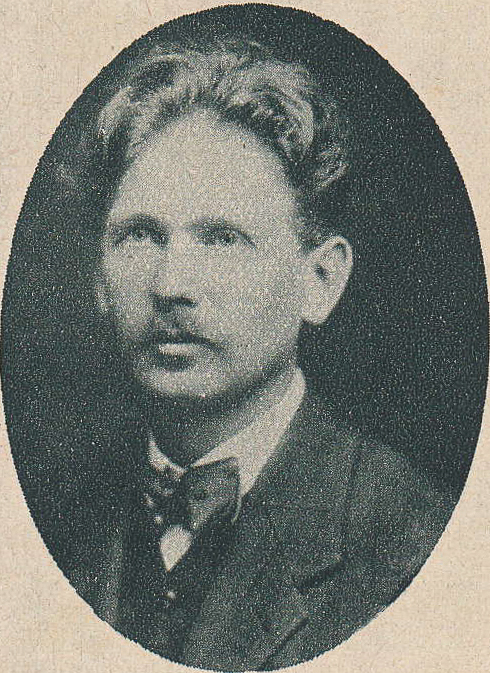
Julius Deutsch

Bauer and the leaders of the Workers' and Soldiers' Councils, Julius Deutsch and Friedrich Adler (the assassin of Karl von Stürgkh had been released from custody by the Emperor in the last days of the war) succeeded in keeping the workers in line with the party and stopping the communist putsch attempts of 12 November 1918 and 14 June 1919. His successes were also due to the fact that in the course of the post-war economic boom that lasted for about two years, the revolutionary fervor of the working class had diminished considerably. It was a period during which workers could find employment, earn a decent wage, pay hardly any rent, and in what had become known as "Red Vienna", were entitled to the first social benefits offered under its SDAP mayor Jakob Reumann.

==== SDAP in opposition ====
The postwar economic boom, which was based primarily on inflationary speculation, began to slow in 1920. Many working people and retirees fell into poverty due to the effects of high inflation. The dissatisfaction over living standards and the renewed solidarity among conservatives were reflected in the election results of 17 October 1920. The SDAP lost its relative majority, with the Christian Socialists 6 percentage points ahead (42% to 36%). The SDAP, at Bauer's insistence, left the coalition with the Christian Socialists. One result of this was that Secretary of the Army Julius Deutsch had to relinquish control of the Austrian Armed Forces, which 14 years later was to play a decisive role in the suppression of social democracy. The Social Democrats did not again participate in a government at the federal level until 1945.

The breaking of the coalition with the Christian Socialists and its decades-long effects prompted the following comment from Karl Renner, who had spoken out against the move in the party executive committee:

Otto Bauer, by his rigid attitude, by the weight of his personality ... made it impossible for the Social Democrats to enter the coalition except at the price of a party split ... Thus the experiment had the 'fortunate' outcome of declaring the republic, which had been founded primarily by the Social Democratic working class as a democratic republic, a purely bourgeois republic.

==== Linz Program ====
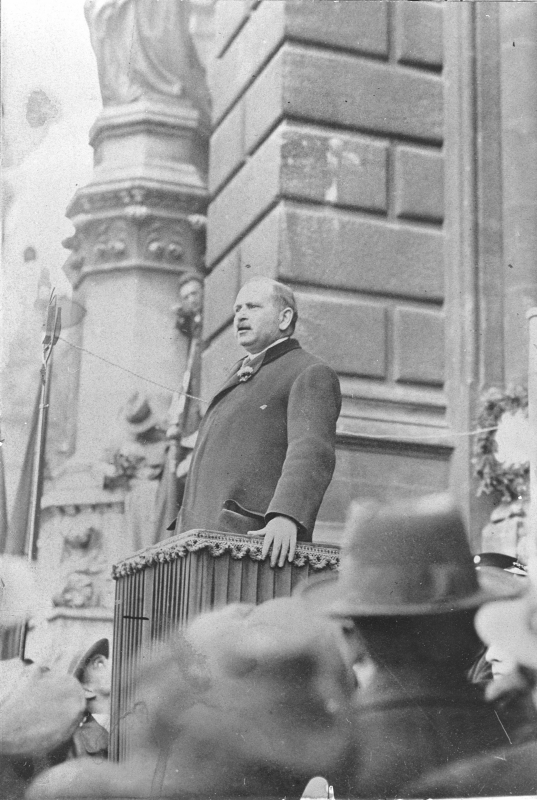
Bauer speaking before Vienna City Hall, 1930.

In 1926 the SDAP adopted a new party program to replace the one that had been adopted in 1901. The original push for a new platform had come from Otto Bauer, who was also one of the main participants in its development. He presented it to the party membership in a fiery speech at the SDAP's 1926 convention in Linz, from which the program took its name. The program contained features from Marxism and the ideology of class conflict, and it provided the theoretical basis for political confrontation with the Christian Social Party and the paramilitary Heimwehr, which at the time were becoming increasingly clerical-fascist. It criticized the fact that the bourgeoisie, through economic power and tradition, still held sway over social institutions. Possible cooperation with them was described as a temporary condition at best, since class antagonisms were irreversible. Democracy was to be placed in the service of labor in order to expropriate big capital and large landed properties and to transfer the means of production and exchange to the "common property of the whole people".

Bauer's revolutionary rhetoric, which used Marxist ideas to define the transition from capitalism to socialism as an inevitable historical necessity, largely overshadowed the party's concrete demands. The SDAP's opponents were able to use quotations from the program to warn against Bolshevism. Bauer distanced himself from the excesses, but only hesitantly from the ideas of the Bolsheviks, and professed the hope that "if ... Russian Bolshevism should succeed ... and the people achieve prosperity ..., then the idea of socialism would gain irresistible appeal throughout the world. Then capitalism's last hour would toll."

The politics of Social Democracy, especially in Red Vienna, where party leader Karl Seitz was mayor, was reform-oriented and democratic. Bruno Kreisky, who was to become the Social Democratic Chancellor of Austria from 1970 to 1983, spoke of a terrible verbal mistake: "[The] phrase 'dictatorship of the proletariat' stuck to the party like a brand. ... It was a dangerous formulation and contrary to everything that could be read in the program."

==== Collapse of Austrian democracy ====
Bauer, with the approval of Seitz and Renner, rejected coalition offers by the Christian Socialist Chancellors Ignaz Seipel in 1931 and Engelbert Dollfuss in 1932. It soon came to be considered a fatal mistake. Kreisky wrote, "In my opinion, it was the last chance to save Austrian democracy."

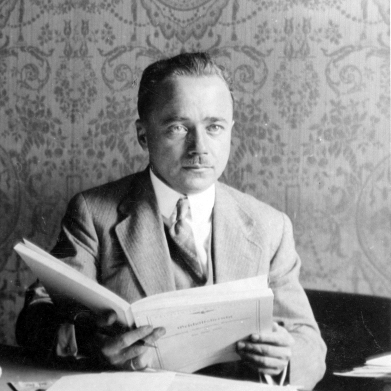
Engelbert Dollfuss

On 4 March 1933 Bauer and Seitz sent party secretary Adolf Schärf to Karl Renner with the advice that he resign as first president of the National Council, due to what came to be known the rules of procedure crisis. Following the resignations on the same day of both the Christian Socialist second president and the Greater German People's Party third president, Chancellor Dollfuss two days later declared the elimination of Parliament and prevented it from reconvening. Although it was mandatory in the SDAP's party statutes for a general strike to be called if Parliament was not allowed to sit, no strike took place.

Bauer did not allow himself to be pushed into action until the operational plans of the Republikanischer Schutzbund ('Republican Protection League') – the SDAP's paramilitary arm established in 1923 to counter the right-wing Heimwehr – were already in the hands of the Dollfuss government and it had cleared out a number of the Schutzbund's weapons caches. In early February 1934, Theodor Körner, who had been a general during World War I and was at the time Chairman of the Austrian Parliament's upper house, was asked at the last minute to take command of the Schutzbund. After examining the Schutzbund structure in six Viennese districts, he implored Bauer on 11 February not to let it come to a clash with the government and its forces under any circumstances. He thought that the Schutzbund and the SDAP would certainly lose.

== Exile (1934–1938) ==
=== Brno ===
In February 1934 a series of skirmishes known as the February Uprising broke out between Austrian government forces and the Schutzbund. It ended in a socialist defeat and the outlawing of the SDAP. On the second day of the four-day uprising, Bauer, Julius Deutsch and other members of the SDAP leadership fled to Czechoslovakia. When he arrived in exile in Brno, he accepted the consequences of the failure of his plans and the criticism he faced from his own ranks by announcing that he would continue to be available to the party as an advisor, journalist and administrator of the party's saved funds, but that he himself would no longer assume any leadership positions.

He supported the Social Democratic underground with his Foreign Office of the Austrian Social Democrats (Auslandsbüro der österreichischen Sozialdemokraten, or ALÖS) through both his words and his actions. His work helped establish the Revolutionary Socialists of Austria under Joseph Buttinger as the successor to the SDAP in 1935. It took the organizational form of a conspiratorial cadre party.

=== Brussels and Paris ===
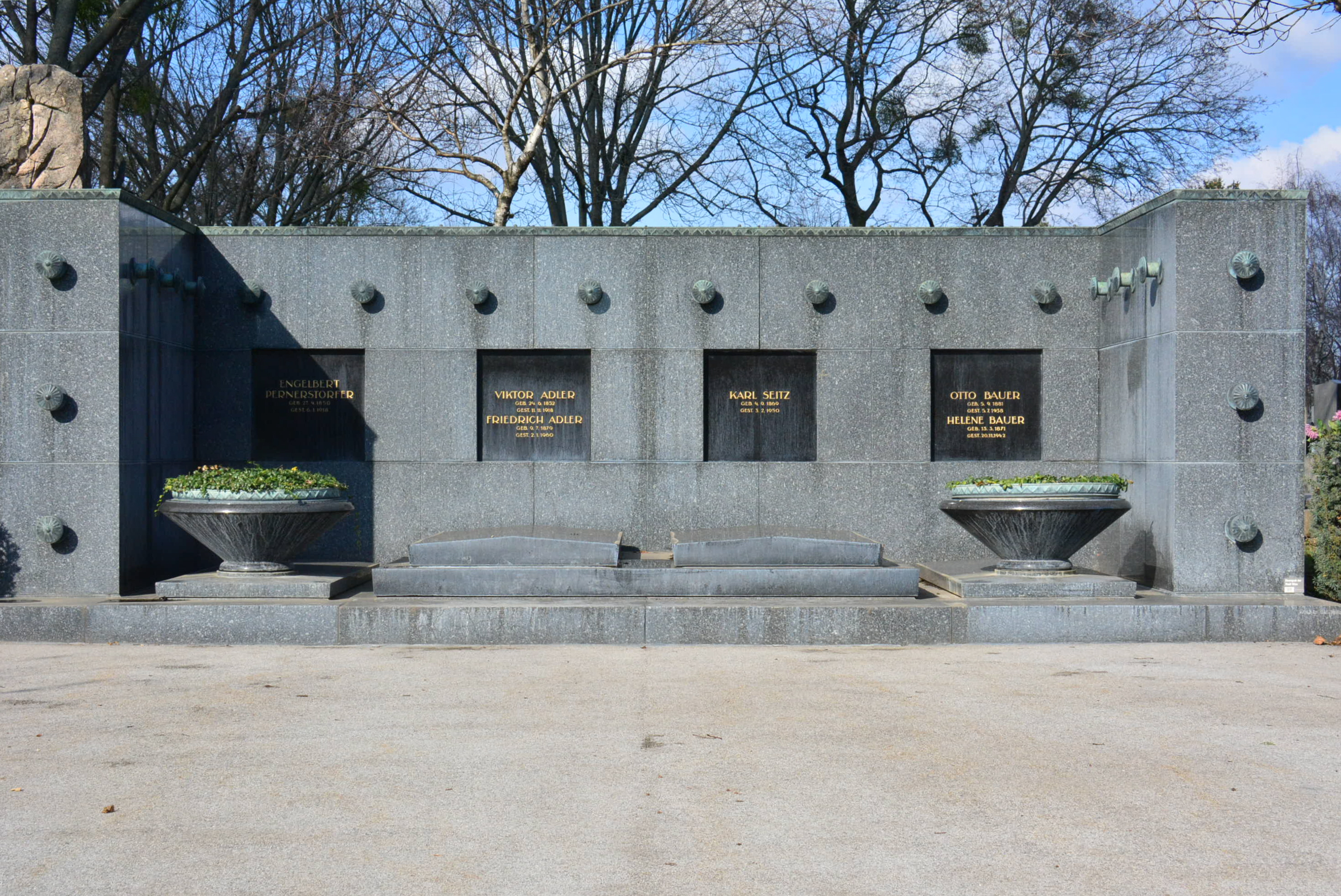
Tomb with the last resting places of Victor Adler, Otto Bauer, Karl Seitz and Engelbert Pernerstorfer, Vienna Central Cemetery

In 1938, with Nazi Germany's Anschluss of Austria, Bauer emigrated to Brussels, where at the end of March his foreign office merged with the leadership of the Revolutionary Socialists, which had fled Austria, to form the Foreign Mission of the Austrian Socialists (Auslandsvertretung der österreichischen Sozialisten, or AVOES). Joseph Buttinger led AVOES, while Bauer was a prominent member and the editor of the newspaper Der sozialistische Kampf ('The Socialist Struggle').

Bauer always praised Germany as a "haven of spirit and progress". In his political testament written in Paris in 1938, he again spoke out in favor of an all-German revolution (including Austria), since he did not believe that a socialist revolution in Austria alone was feasible. When Karl Renner declared in favor of the Anschluss with Germany because he thought that Nazism would be temporary and no worse than Chancellor Kurt Schuschnigg's authoritarian system, Bauer thought that he was correct. Kreisky noted that Bauer always considered and felt himself to be German.

On 5 July 1938, at the age of 56, Otto Bauer succumbed to a heart attack in Paris. He was buried in the Père Lachaise cemetery opposite the monument to the fighters of the Paris Commune of 1871. In 1948 his urn was brought to Vienna and on 12 November 1950 reburied in an honorary grave at the Vienna Central Cemetery next to those of Victor Adler and Karl Seitz.

== Political philosophy ==
=== General analytic themes ===
Otto Bauer's ideas were characterized by a mixture of objective analysis, Marxism and other era-specific influences:

- cultural-idealist German nationalism, which clearly influenced Bauer's writings on the nationality question and his attitude toward the unification problem in 1919
- a certain fiscal orthodoxy, which made Bauer very skeptical of measures to create jobs during the Great Depression
- the Marxist theme of the "objective conditions" that decisively shape the scope for political action, which was related to a certain 'wait and see' attitude on his part that was personally tinged and that manifested itself in a mixture of revolutionary rhetoric and a latent awareness of weakness

Bauer provided political analyses in many areas, such as his insight that the world was between two world wars at the end of the 1930s and his reflections on rationalization and faulty rationalization. His analyses were not, however, followed by guidance for political action.

=== Concept of revolution ===
Otto Bauer's concept of revolution bore distinctly reformist features. In 1928 he wrote:

"It is not the great geological catastrophe that has reshaped the world; no, it is the small revolutions in the imperceptible, in the atoms that can no longer be studied even with a microscope, that change the world, that produce the force that then in one day is released in a geological catastrophe. The small, the imperceptible, what we call detail work, that is the truly revolutionary."

A problem with this line of argument, as for example in the Linz Program, was that the SDAP's opponents could point to the emotive word 'revolution'. As early as the 1920s, the established goal of political opponents was to avoid becoming victims of (Austro)Marxist radical reforms.

=== Justification of the SDAP's 'wait and see' approach ===
In terms of historical materialism and in light of the dire economic conditions in Austria in the 1920s, Bauer was convinced that the objective conditions for revolution merely had to be allowed to mature, since it was certain that they would come about. The party's waiting was therefore to be seen as an appropriate "revolutionary pause", because any shared responsibility involving dubious partnerships (meaning coalition offers by the Christian Socialists) would only lead to delaying the collapse of the prevailing capitalist order.

What Bauer was waiting for was an absolute majority of votes in the country, which he was sure would sooner or later come to the SDAP. Then the achievements of "Red Vienna", from which Bauer drew a good part of his strength and confidence, would serve not as the ultimate goal, but rather as the basis for further development toward a socialization of the economy that would be nearly impossible to reverse.

With his visions of the widespread upheavals that would inevitably follow an election victory, Bauer kept the left wing of the party in line for a long time, but after 5 March 1933 – the day the German Nazi Party won the largest share of seats in Germany's Reichstag election – the left wing accused him of inappropriate hesitation in defending against the advance of fascism.

=== Integral socialism ===
On the international level, Bauer tried to maintain the idea that the victory of socialism conformed to the laws of historical materialism. His idea of integral socialism, with the medium term goal of reuniting Bolsheviks and reformist social democrats, nevertheless proved in practice not to be realizable.

The International Working Union of Socialist Parties that was initiated for the purpose of such a reunification was tasked with mediating between the Second (Socialist) and Third (Communist) Internationals. The members of the Third International were to be encouraged to take steps towards internal democratization and those of the Second International to turn away from reformism. The project, which was derided by Karl Radek, a Polish functionary of the Third International, as an "excretory product of the world revolution (decoctus historiae)", failed.

== Evaluation ==
=== Opponents ===
As a leading theoretician of Austromarxism, Otto Bauer shaped his party's 1926 Linz Program. It, and especially the conditionally formulated passage on the dictatorship of the proletariat, led conservatives and German nationalists to warn against "Austrobolshevism". Opponents also accused Bauer of having fled the country in the course of the February 1934 uprising.

=== Colleagues ===
In 1953 Joseph Buttinger wrote:

The steel framework of his doctrinal edifice was the recognition of the objective relations that determine the 'real course of history'. [...] Reality, which Marx taught men to recognize so that they might rise against it, Bauer placed on the highest throne. What was real had prevailed against material obstacles and human intentions, was accordingly an inevitable result of social development, necessary, and therefore as an evil at the same time good, for it was also the precondition of all better things to come. This was true not only of capitalism, it was equally true of reformism and the Russian Revolution. Consequently, it was the duty of revolutionaries to recognize the 'power of circumstances' from which reformism sprang.

This can, however, as Buttinger noted, lead to the conviction "that the opposite of revolutionary politics, if it corresponds to 'circumstances', is as good for the victory of socialism as the latter itself."

The SDAP politician Wilhelm Ellenbogen painted the picture of a dazzling theoretician, a forceful, eloquent idealist who lacked only one thing:

that absolute, instinctive accuracy in political judgment, the 'nose' which distinguishes the genuine political genius from the dilettante, and lets him, as it were, blindly hit the right target, and for which there is no rule, no theory and no textbook.

The "Declaration of the Left" at the Social Democratic Party Congress in October 1933 held Bauer's policy to account in almost angry terms:

The policy of the party leadership since March of this year has been a policy of waiting, a tactic of letting the enemy dictate all deadlines, all terms of conflict. This tactic is wrong. In recent months, the government has made its tactics clear even to the politically blind. It is not a fascism that storms but a fascism that creeps which we have to repel ... The tactic is wrong that says: not today, not tomorrow, but if the government does this and that, then we will proclaim a general strike.

=== Later influences ===
The basic features of Bauer's Austromarxism can be found in the Revolutionary Socialists, who Bauer supported and were active underground from 1934 to 1938, and after 1938 in the Foreign Mission of the Austrian Socialists (AVOES).

In 1945 the newly founded "Social Democratic Party of Austria (Social Democrats and Revolutionary Socialists)" (SPÖ) oriented itself around Bauer's ideological opposite, Karl Renner, who served as the first Chancellor of the Republic of Austria. Bauer's Marxism initially retained a certain formal status, as can be seen from the addition of the parenthetic 'Social Democrats and Revolutionary Socialists' to the official party name, but its influence quickly waned, since most Social Democrats wanted nothing to do with the vocabulary used by Communists. The conservative Austrian People's Party (ÖVP) had long warned against what it saw as the threatening red united front.

The social philosopher Norbert Leser held that Bauer's death in 1938 prevented a difficult dispute over the post-war direction of the SPÖ:

Had Otto Bauer – the brain and soul of Austromarxism – still been alive in 1945 and returned to Austria, it would hardly have been possible to avoid a dispute about the mistakes of the old leadership, but with him serving as a dead icon who was invoked on holidays but denied in everyday life, the postwar SPÖ got along fine.

Bruno Kreisky honored Otto Bauer with a nine-volume edition of his works published beginning in 1975, but it no longer had any impact on party policy. In 1986 Kreisky considered Bauer among the great men he had met "despite some misjudgments of a superior intellect".

What had given Bauer's Austromarxism its international uniqueness was the attempt to steer a Marxist middle course between the Bolsheviks and the reformist Social Democrats with the ultimate goal of democratizing the Soviet Union and reuniting them all in a common International. In the Cold War period, until the beginning of Mikhail Gorbachev's reform, the hope proved illusory and it remained unreal even later.

=== Tributes ===
In 1914 Otto Bauer rented an apartment in a middle-class building at the corner of Gumpendorfer Strasse 70 and Kasernengasse 2 in Vienna's 6th district of Mariahilf and lived there until he fled Austria in 1934. Kasernengasse was renamed Otto-Bauer-Gasse in 1949 in his honor.

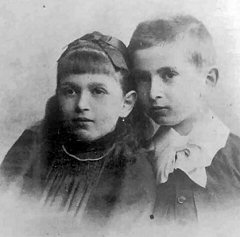
Ida and Otto Bauer

=== Family ===
Otto Bauer's son Martin, born in 1919, was a successful animator and film producer in Austria who was responsible for numerous remarkable television commercials in the 1950s and 1960s. For the 1966 National Council election he produced a cartoon commercial for the SPÖ at his own expense.

Otto's sister Ida Bauer (1882–1945) became known as a patient of Sigmund Freud, who wrote a famous case history about her in which he referred to her by the pseudonym "Dora". Katharina Adler, born in 1980, told the story of her great-grandmother in her novel Ida, published in the summer of 2018.

A nephew of Otto Bauer was the orchestral conductor Kurt Herbert Adler.

== Major works ==
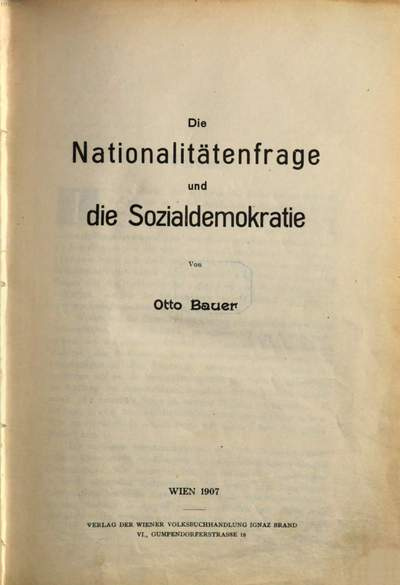
Cover of The Question of Nationalities and Social Democracy 1907 edition

- The Question of Nationalities and Social Democracy (1907)
- The World Revolution (1919)
- The Road to Socialism (1919)
- Bolshevism or Social Democracy? (1920)
- The New Course of Soviet Russia (1921)
- The Austrian Revolution (1923)
- Fascism (1936)
- The Crisis of Democracy (1936)
- Between Two World Wars? (1936)
