= Habsburg Law =

Law of German Austria in 1919

Habsburg Law Habsburgergesetz
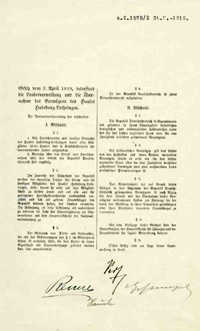

Constituent National Assembly
- Long title: Law of 3 April 1919 Concerning the Expulsion and the Takeover of the Assets of the House of Habsburg-Lorraine Gesetz vom 3. April 1919 betreffend die Landesverweisung und die Übernahme des Vermögens des Hauses Habsburg-Lothringen
- Citation: StGBl. Nr. 209/1919
- Enacted by: Constituent National Assembly
- Enacted: 3 April 1919
- Introduced by: Chancellor Karl Renner
- Status: Amended

The Law of 3 April 1919 Concerning the Expulsion and the Takeover of the Assets of the House of Habsburg-Lorraine (German: Gesetz vom 3. April 1919 betreffend die Landesverweisung und die Übernahme des Vermögens des Hauses Habsburg-Lothringen), commonly known as the Habsburg Law (German: Habsburgergesetz), was a law originally passed by the Constituent National Assembly of the Republic of German-Austria, one of the successor states of dissolved Austria-Hungary, on 3 April 1919. The law dethroned the House of Habsburg-Lorraine as rulers of the country, which had declared itself a republic on 12 November 1918, exiled them and confiscated their property. The Habsburg Law was repealed in 1935 and the Habsburg family was given back its property. However, in 1938, following the Anschluss, the Nazis reintroduced the Habsburg Law, and it was retained when Austria regained its independence after World War II.

The law has been found to violate human rights, and for this reason, Austria was forced to repeal large parts of it, notably the ban on members of the Habsburg family entering Austria, before being admitted to the European Union in 1995. After a report by the Organization for Security and Co-operation in Europe (OSCE) criticized the prohibition against members of the Habsburg family running for the Austrian presidency, this provision was also withdrawn in June 2011 by the Austrian parliament. Although the law still remains in force, it is considered largely obsolete, with the notable exception of the confiscation of the family's property in force since 1938.

== First Republic ==
On 11 November 1918, Emperor Charles I, counseled by ministers of his last Imperial and Royal government as well as by ministers of German Austria, issued a proclamation relinquishing his right to take part in Austrian affairs of state. He also released the officials in Cisleithania from their oath of loyalty to him. On the following day, the Provisional National Assembly of German-Austria, which claimed authority over the German-speaking portions of the western Habsburg lands (mostly the Danubian and Alpine provinces) proclaimed German-Austria a republic and announced its union with the German republic.

In the night after his proclamation Charles I and his family left Schönbrunn Palace in Vienna and moved to Schloss Eckartsau east of the city, then belonging to the Habsburg Family Funds. There he was visited by a Hungarian delegation and on 13 November signed a similar proclamation for the Kingdom of Hungary.

Although these proclamations have sometimes been interpreted as abdications, Charles did not formally abdicate, intending to retain his freedom of action in case the people of either nation recalled him. The new republican government of Austria, uncomfortable with this situation, gave Charles three options: (1) abdicate formally and remain in Austria as a private citizen, (2) leave the country or (3) be interned.

With the help of lieutenant colonel Edward Lisle Strutt, a British Army officer sent by King George V, who was shocked by the fate of his Russian relatives, on 23 March Charles and his family departed from Eckartsau for Switzerland in the former Imperial train, Charles wearing a field marshal's uniform. Before crossing the border on the morning of 24 March 1919, and changing into civilian clothes, he issued the Feldkircher Manifest, reiterating his claims to sovereignty and stating that any decision by the German-Austrian national assembly relating to the issue was "null and void for me and my House." Officials of the new republican government were angered that Charles had left Austria without explicitly abdicating. Accordingly, on 3 April, the German-Austrian parliament, on the initiative of Chancellor Karl Renner, passed the Habsburg Law.

The law stripped the Habsburgs of their sovereign rights and banished all Habsburgs from Austrian territory. Charles was barred from ever returning to Austria again. Other Habsburgs were only allowed to return if they renounced all dynastic claims and accepted status as private citizens. Those assets of the state that had been under the administration of the imperial court, the so-called Hofärar, were placed under the government's management. The private funds and family funds of the House of Habsburg, common family property administered by the respective head of the house, were expropriated and transferred to the state property. Personal private property was preserved.

Also on 3 April, nobility was abolished in German-Austria, with the "Law on the Abolition of Nobility" (Adelsaufhebungsgesetz).

The family demanded that various endowments and funds be placed at their disposal as personal private property; in response to this, and to clear up ambiguities related to this, the Habsburg Law was amended on 30 October 1919, retroactively from 3 April, expressly recording which of the claimed funds or endowments, in particular, were to count as expropriated.

When the Austrian Constitution came into force in 1920, the Habsburg Law was made a constitutional law. However, the provisions of the Habsburg Law concerning expropriation were expressly not brought into force in Burgenland in 1922 (as well as the Law on the Abolition of Nobility) when it became part of Austria. This was intended to turn the Burgenland aristocrats (who included members of the Habsburg family) more pro-Austrian, for pragmatic reasons. The oddity of a constitutional rule not applying to the whole republic was only "repaired" in 2008, when a federal constitutional law declared that by 1 January 2008, the Habsburg Law in total is valid wherever in Austria.

== The state of Austria and the Nazi era ==
The Habsburg Law was downgraded under Federal Chancellor Kurt Schuschnigg on 13 July 1935 at the time of the Austrofascist Ständestaat (state of estates) from the status of constitutional law to that of normal law; the ban on certain Habsburgs from entering the country was lifted. The "Family-Provision Fund" of the Habsburg family was restored, and substantial property was returned to the fund.

After the Anschluss, Reichsstatthalter Arthur Seyss-Inquart, head of the "Austrian State Government", enacted the "Law on the cancellation of the transfer of property to the House of Habsburg-Lorraine", on 14 March 1939, on the grounds of a personal Führer decree; thus, the property passed without compensation to the "Land Austria", part of the Third Reich.

== Second Republic ==
In 1945, the Second Republic brought into force again the Constitution of 1920/1929 according to its version as of 1933, and with it also the Habsburg Law of 1919. With the Constitution Transition Law, all constitutional laws enacted between 1933 and 1945, and all laws which were not compatible with the constitution that was in force until 1933, were repealed. Thus, the legal situation of the First Republic was restored.

In 1955, at the explicit request of the USSR the Habsburg law became part of the Austrian State Treaty.

From 1960, many members of the House Habsburg-Lorraine signed the waiver. In 1961, it was also signed by Archduke Otto von Habsburg, Charles' son, who had succeeded his father as head of the house upon his father's death in 1922. His entry was delayed until 1966 by the Habsburg crisis, in which the legal validity of his declaration was questioned. In this connection the National Council decided to interpret the Habsburg Law authentically, with a majority of the Social Democratic Party (SPÖ) and the Austrian Freedom Party (FPÖ). Permission to enter was granted to the last empress, Zita of Bourbon-Parma, without a waiver, in 1982, because she was a Habsburg only by marriage and could therefore make no claim to the imperial throne.

Members of the Habsburg family and other families, "that have ruled before", have according to article 60, paragraph 3 of the federal constitution, the same rights and possibilities as any other Austrians, except from being unable to serve as Federal President. In 2010, Ulrich Habsburg-Lothringen, living in Carinthia, unsuccessfully tried to be accepted as a candidate at the federal president's elections.

The Arbitration Panel of the General Settlement Fund for Victims of National Socialism (decisions 5/2004, 6/2004, 7/2004) has declared that it lacks jurisdiction over applications of the Habsburg family, for reasons of constitutional and international law. In a subsequent complaint of the Habsburg family concerning decisions of the Arbitration Panel, the Austrian constitutional court has declared that it lacks jurisdiction.
