= State Council (German-Austria) =

Executive Leadership of the Republic of German-Austria

State Council Staatsrat
- Coat of Arms of German-Austria
- Type: Collegiate body
- Status: Head of State; Chief executive; Cabinet
- Jurisdiction: Provisional National Assembly
- Country: German-Austria

History
- Established: 30 October 1918
- Preceded by: Emperor of Austria (assumed all powers)
- Succeeded by: President of the Constituent National Assembly (as head of state); State Government (as cabinet); Principal committee of the National Assembly (received remaining powers)
- Dissolved: 15 March 1919

Composition
- Directory: Presidents of the National Assembly; State Chancellor; State Notary
- Staff: 20 members of the National Assembly; State Secretaries

The State Council (German: Staatsrat) was the executive leadership of the Republic of German-Austria, a collegiate body established in the last days of World War I by the Provisional National Assembly.

== Details ==
The council comprised the three co-equal Presidents of the National Assembly Franz Dinghofer, Johann Hauser (who had replaced Jodok Fink) and Karl Seitz, as well as 20 other elected members of the National Assembly.

One member was chosen to serve as state notary and had the task to sign acts of the State Council into law. The state notary was solely charged with validating these acts and not with countersigning them, which would have otherwise granted him the power of denial.

The three Presidents of the National Assembly, the head of the chancellery (Chancellor Karl Renner) and the state notary formed the Directory of the State Council.

The State Council appointed the First Renner government as of 30 October 1918. On 12 November 1918, the council provisionally assumed all constitutional powers of the emperor.

== Executive role ==
The State Council exercised its executive powers through the state secretaries who in turn were coordinated by the state chancellor – all of these together formed the state government. The state secretaries headed the state offices (analogous to modern ministries), commonly in direct succession of the monarchic ministries. The State Office of Foreign Affairs for example succeeded the Imperial and Royal Ministry of Foreign Affairs (the first State Secretary was Victor Adler, who already died on 11 November 1918), the State Office of Military Affairs succeeded the Imperial and Royal Ministry of War and the Imperial and Royal Ministry of Defence, the State Office of Traffic Affairs succeeded the Imperial and Royal Ministry of Railways.

Undersecretaries of state could be assigned as political assistants to the state secretaries.

== Dissolution ==
With the implementation of the law on the state government (created on 14 March 1919), the State Council and its directory as well as the state notary were abolished in March 1919. The status of head of state was transferred to Karl Seitz as President of the Constituent National Assembly. Remaining powers were overtaken by the state government and the newly established standing principal committee of the National Assembly.
