= Staatsrat =

Staatsrat may refer to:

- State Council of East Germany
- State Council (German-Austria)
- Staatsrat of Prussia
- Staatsrat of the Habsburg monarchy, cf. Hofkriegsrat, Joseph II
- Staatsrat (title), a political position in several German states
