= Jodok Fink =

Austrian politician (1853–1929)

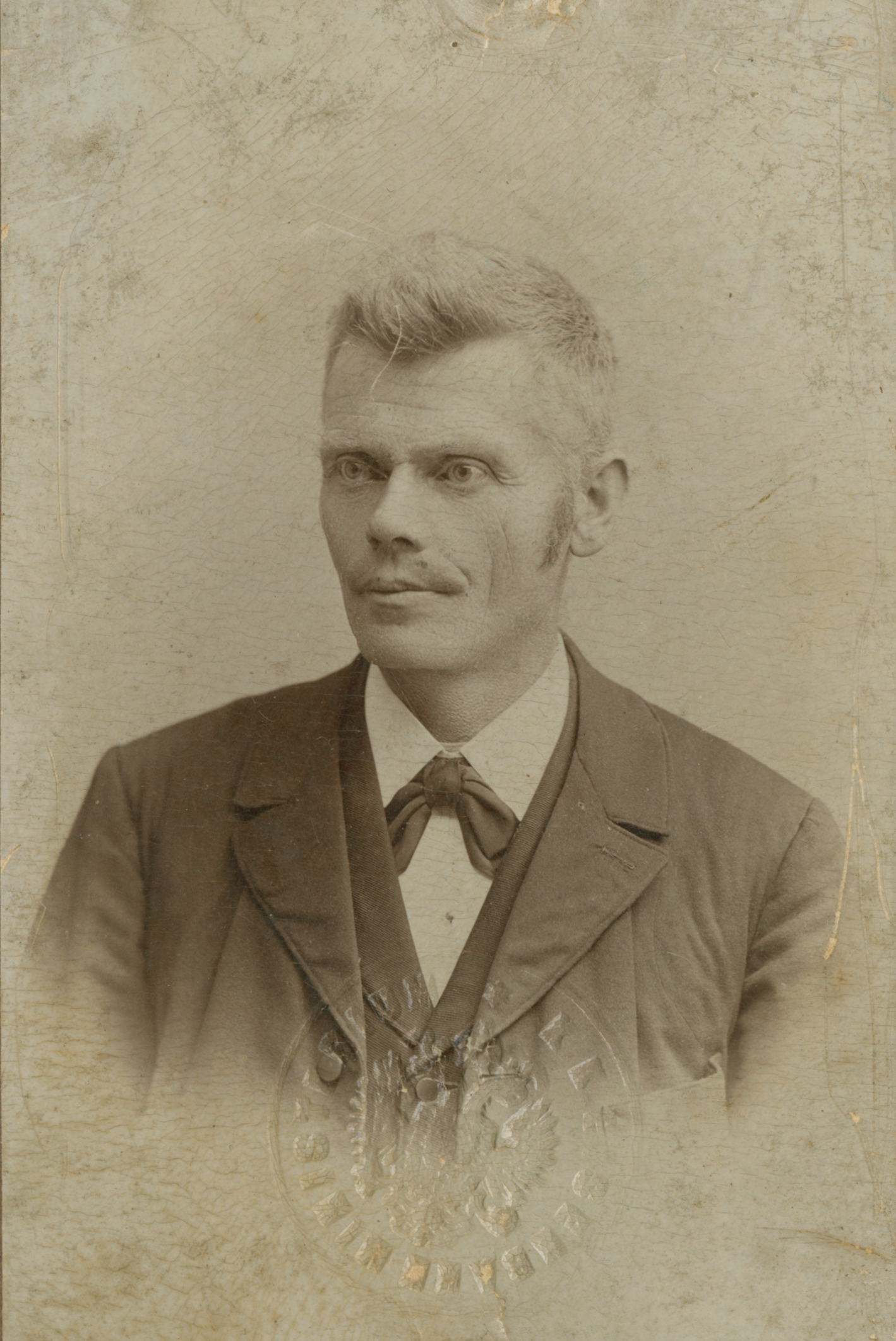
- Fink c. 1909

Vice-Chancellor of Austria
- In office 15 March 1919 – 24 June 1920
- Chancellor: Karl Renner
- Preceded by: Office established
- Succeeded by: Ferdinand Hanusch

President of the Provisional National Assembly
- In office 21 October 1918 – 16 February 1919 Serving with Franz Dinghofer, Johann Hauser, Karl Seitz
- Preceded by: Office established
- Succeeded by: Office abolished

Personal details
- Born: 19 February 1853; Andelsbuch, Vorarlberg, Austrian Empire
- Died: 1 July 1929 (aged 76); Andelsbuch, Vorarlberg, Austria
- Political party: Christian Social Party

Jodok Fink (19 February 1853 – 1 July 1929) was an Austrian farmer and politician who served as the first Vice-Chancellor of Austria from 15 March 1919 to 24 June 1920.

== Life ==
Fink was born in Andelsbuch, in the Bregenz Forest region, the son of a farmer's family. He and his younger brother Alois were the only surviving children; his father died when Fink was four years old, whereafter his mother remarried. The bright pupil went on to attend the Gymnasium secondary school in Brixen but soon had to abandon his education to work on his family's farmstead.

Fink began his political career in 1879, when he was elected a member of the municipal assembly (Gemeindeausschuss) in Andelsbuch and served as mayor from 1888 to 1897. Actually a moderate Conservative, he joined the Landtag assembly of Vorarlberg in 1890 and the newly established Christian Social Party in 1893. He was elected MP of the Austrian Imperial Council parliament in 1897 where he did not join the faction of his antiliberal and antisemitic Christian Social party fellows until 1901. His career as a CS party executive was further promoted, when the long-time leader Karl Lueger died in 1910.

During the dissolution of the Austro-Hungarian Empire at the end of World War I, Fink was elected one of the three presidents of the German-Austrian provisional national assembly on 21 October 1918. He made his mark as a strong opponent of a unification with the German Weimar Republic, though against the majority of the assembly, and also spoke against tendencies to attach his Allemannic home country Vorarlberg to Switzerland.

Upon the Austrian Constitutional Assembly election, Fink on 15 March 1919 was able to forge a grand coalition government with the left-wing Social Democratic Workers' Party (SDAP) under State Chancellor Karl Renner and to assume the newly established office of an Austrian Vice-Chancellor. Fink played a vital role in Austrian internal politics during the negotiations leading to the Treaty of Saint-Germain-en-Laye, becoming CS faction leader in the National Council parliament, which ratified the treaty on 17 October 1919. Accompanied by fierce protests, Chancellor Renner and his government resigned, though another cabinet of Social Democratic and Christian Social ministers under Renner and Fink was immediately formed and confirmed by the National Council.

Fink was superseded by his party fellow Michael Mayr, when Renner's coalition government finally broke up on 7 July 1920. Upon the legislative election of 1920 on 17 October, Mayr formed a minority government backed by the right-wing Greater German People's Party and Fink during the subsequent period of political radicalisation no longer held any government offices, but remained considered an éminence grise and power broker.

== See also ==
- List of members of the Austrian Parliament who died in office
