= German Democrats =

Austrian political party

The German Democrats (German: Deutschdemokraten) was a political party in Austria.

== History ==
The only election contested by the party was the 1919 Constitutional Assembly elections, in which it received 2.2% of the national vote and won three seats. The party did not contest the elections the following year.
