= Marko Feingold =

Holocaust survivor (1913–2019)

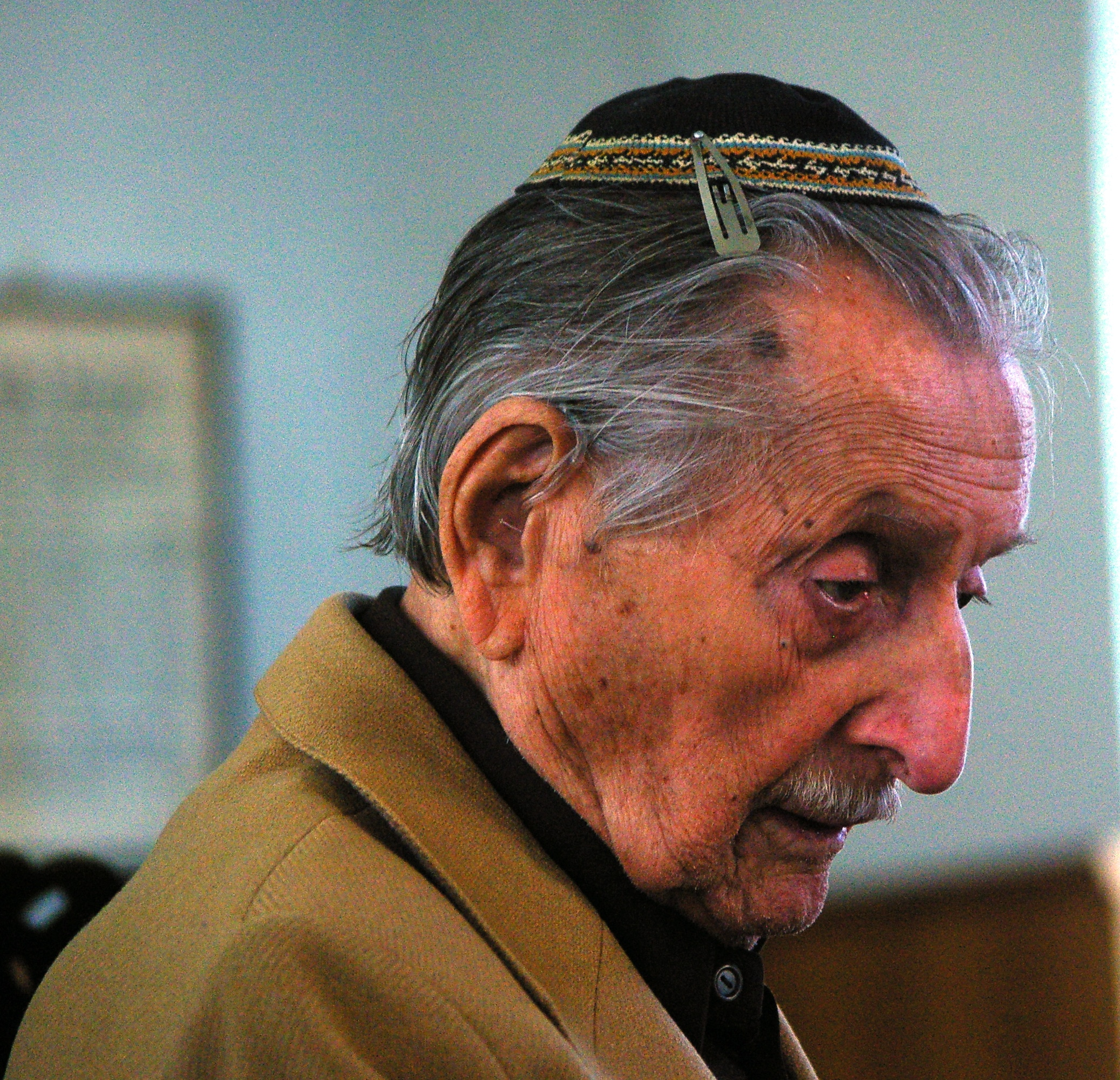
- Marko Feingold, the month before his 102nd birthday
- Born: May 28, 1913; Besztercebánya, Kingdom of Hungary, Austria-Hungary
- Died: September 19, 2019 (aged 106); Salzburg, Austria

Marko M. Feingold (28 May 1913 – 19 September 2019) was an Austrian Holocaust survivor and centenarian, who served as the president of the Jewish community in Salzburg, and was in charge of Salzburg's synagogue.

== Information ==
Marko Feingold was born in Besztercebánya (Neusohl in German), Austria-Hungary, today Banská Bystrica, Slovakia. He grew up in Leopoldstadt, Vienna. After he had trained in business, he found work in Vienna, became unemployed and travelled with his brother, Ernst, in Italy. In 1938, he was arrested in Vienna during a short visit. At first he escaped to Prague, was expelled to Poland and turned back to Prague with false papers. In 1939, he was arrested again and deported to the concentration camp at Auschwitz. He was also imprisoned in the concentration camps at Neuengamme and Dachau and finally the concentration camp Buchenwald in 1941, where he stayed until his liberation in 1945.

He moved to Salzburg by chance, where he stayed. Between 1945 and 1948, he helped Jewish survivors who were living in displaced person camps in Salzburg and organised, with the Jewish refugee organisation Bricha, the emigration of Jews from middle and eastern Europe to Palestine. In 1948 he acquired a fashion store. At that time he was initially a member of the SPÖ, but later left the party due to its particularly anti-Semitic orientation influenced by Karl Renner. Nevertheless, he later became an honorary member. As one of the oldest contemporary witnesses, Feingold explicitly commented in 2013 and 2018 in the media on Karl Renner's support for the Anschluss and anti-Semitism. Feingold also criticized the social democrats in this context and said that after 1945, after a complaint by the party secretary of the SPÖ, he was chased out with the words Saujud, verschwind!).

Between 1946 and 1947, Feingold was briefly the president of the Jewish community in Salzburg. Shortly after his retirement in 1977, he became vice president and then, in 1979, president of the Jewish community once again. Following his retirement, he gave many lectures about his time in concentration camps, the Holocaust and Judaism.

Feingold died September 19, 2019, at the age of 106.

== Awards and decorations ==
- Decoration for Services to the Liberation of Austria (1977)
- Silver Medal for Services to the Republic of Austria (1985)
- Civil Letter of the City of Salzburg (1985)
- Medal of the City of Salzburg coat of arms in gold (1988)
- Golden Cross of Merit of the Federal State of Salzburg (1988)
- Appointed Councillor (1991)
- Honorary cup of Salzburg (1993)
- Golden Medal of Honour of the Province of Salzburg (1998)
- Ring of the City of Salzburg (2003)
- Honorary Citizen of the city of Salzburg (2008)
- Kurt Schubert Memorial Award (2010)
- Golden Ring of Honour of the University of Salzburg (2012)
- Member of the European Academy of Sciences and Arts
