= Carinthian Farmers' Association =

The Carinthian Farmers' Association (German: Kärtner Bauernbund) was a political party in Austria.

== History ==
The party contested the 1919 Constitutional Assembly elections, receiving 1.1% of the national vote and two seats. In the parliamentary elections the following year it was part of the German Nationals group, which won 28 seats.
