= Styrian Farmers' Party =

The Styrian Farmers' Party (German: Steirische Bauernpartei) was a political party in Austria.

== History ==
The only election contested by the party was the 1919 Constitutional Assembly elections, in which it received 1.6% of the national vote and won three seats. The party did not contest the elections the following year.
