= Heinrich Mataja =

Austrian politician (1877–1937)

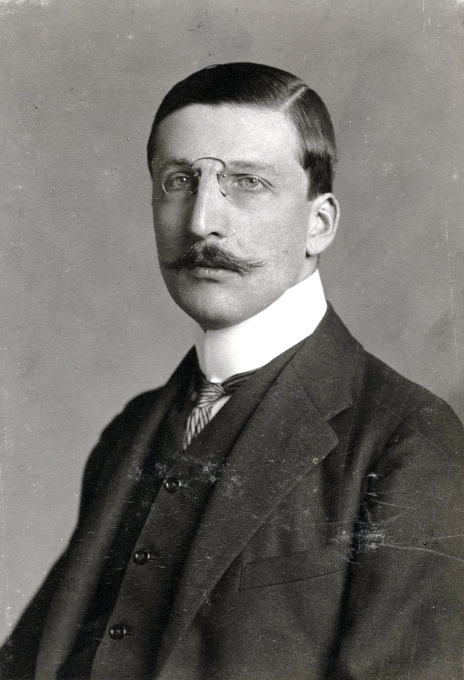
- Heinrich Mataja before 1920

Minister of the Interior
- In office 30 October 1918 – 15 March 1919
- Chancellor: Karl Renner
- Preceded by: office established
- Succeeded by: Karl Renner

Minister of Foreign Affairs
- In office 20 November 1924 – 15 January 1926
- Chancellor: Rudolf Ramek
- Preceded by: Alfred Grünberger
- Succeeded by: Rudolf Ramek

Personal details
- Born: 14 March 1877 Vienna, Austria-Hungary
- Died: 23 January 1937 (aged 59) Vienna, Austria
- Party: Christian Social Party
- Profession: Lawyer; Politician

Heinrich Mataja (14 March 1877 – 23 January 1937) was an Austrian lawyer and politician of the Christian Social Party.

== Life and political career ==
Mataja was from 1913 to 1918 a member of the Imperial Council (Austria). From 21 October 1918, he was a member of the from this emerged Provisorische Nationalversammlung for the Republic of German-Austria, of 4 March 1919, a member of the Constituent National Assembly and from 10 November 1920 – 1930 member of the National Council (Austria).

During this period he was still from 30 October 1918 to 15 March 1919 in the government Renner I State Minister of the Interior and from 20 November 1924 to 14 January 1926 Austrian foreign minister.

He supported the Christian Federal State of Austria formed in 1934 by Engelbert Dollfuss. He was from 1896 to 1900 a member of the fraternity Wiener Akademische Burschenschaft Olympia.

He was brought with the signs of a stroke to hospital on 22 January 1937. He died there the next day. On 27 January 1937 he was buried at the Wiener Zentralfriedhof in an honorary grave of the town Vienna.

== Works ==
- Ten political essays from the years 1911-1913 . Opitz, Vienna 1913 ANL.
- The vote on the budget . Loibl & Patzelt, Vienna 1914 ANL.
- The Origin of the World War . Fonts for political enlightenment. Central European publisher, Berlin-Steglitz 1921 ANL.
- German-Austria . In: Ferdinand Schönemann (inter alia): Felix Hase: England. Ferdinand Schönemann: North America. Robert van Sint-Jan: Belgium. Heinrich Mataja: German-Austria . . Regensberg, Münster i W. 1924 S. S. 113-272, ANL.
- Austrian politics in XIX. and XX. Century. A historical overview . Reports on cultural and contemporary history, Volume 10.1934 / 35 (= no. 225/226). Reinhold, Vienna 1934 OBV.

== Literature ==
- Lothar Höbelt (1990). "Mataja, Heinrich". Neue Deutsche Biographie (in German). Vol. 16. Berlin: Duncker & Humblot. pp. 364–365. (137 937 598.html full text online).
- Elisabeth Jelinek: Political Journey Dr. Heinrich Matajas. A contribution to the history of the Christian Socialist Party in the First Republic . Dissertation. University of Vienna, Vienna 1971 OBV.
- E. Jelinek, J. T. Lilla: "6 / 134 .pdf Mataja Henry". In: Österreichisches Biographisches Lexikon 1815–1950 (ÖBL). Vol. 6 , Austrian Academy of Sciences, Vienna 1975, ISBN 3-7001-0128-7, p. 134 f. (Direct links to "6 / 134 .pdf p. 134 ", "6 /135.pdf p. 135")
