= Michael Mayr =

Austrian politician (1864–1922)

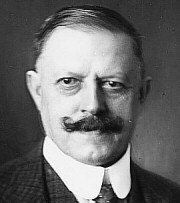

Chancellor of Austria
- In office 7 July 1920 – 21 June 1921
- President: Karl Seitz; Michael Hainisch
- Vice-Chancellor: Ferdinand Hanusch; Eduard Heinl; Walter Breisky
- Preceded by: Karl Renner
- Succeeded by: Johann Schober

Minister of Foreign Affairs
- In office 22 October 1920 – 21 June 1921
- Preceded by: Karl Renner
- Succeeded by: Johann Schober

Minister without portfolio
- In office 17 October 1919 – 24 June 1920
- Preceded by: Office established
- Succeeded by: Wilhelm Ellenbogen

Personal details
- Born: 10 April 1864 Adlwang, Austrian Empire
- Died: 22 May 1922 (aged 58) Waldneukirchen, Austria
- Party: Christian Social Party
- Education: University of Vienna

Michael Mayr (10 April 1864 – 22 May 1922) was an Austrian politician, who served as Chancellor of Austria in the First Austrian Republic from July 1920 to June 1921. He was a member of the Christian Social Party, and by profession a historian.

== Life ==
Mayr was born in Adlwang in Upper Austria, the son of a farmer. He studied history and geography at the University of Vienna and earned a doctorate in 1890. From 1897 through 1920, he served as director of the Tyrol State Archives (Tiroler Landesarchiv). In 1900, he became a Professor of Modern History at the University of Innsbruck.

Mayr's political career began under the Austro-Hungarian Empire, when from 1907 to 1911 he was a member of the Imperial Council (Reichsrat) legislature and from 1908 to 1914 of the Tyrolean Landtag assembly. With the breakup of the Empire at the end of World War I, Mayr was in 1919–1920 a delegate for the Christian Social Party to the National Assembly drafting the new Constitution of Austria. State Chancellor (Staatskanzler) Karl Renner appointed him a state secretary in his grand coalition government on 17 October 1919.

After Renner's cabinet finally collapsed, Mayr, on 7 July 1920, succeeded him as acting "director of the state chancellery", as part of an interim government of his Christian Social Party and the Social Democratic Labor Party (SDAP). Renner himself remained State Secretary for Foreign Affairs until the Social Democrats left the Austrian government after their disappointing outcome in the Austrian legislative election of 17 October, to remain in opposition until the end of World War II. From 10 November, with the Constitution's coming into force, the cabinet formed the Austrian Federal Government, with Mayr as Federal Chancellor (Bundeskanzler).

On 20 November 1920, the newly established National Council parliament elected Mayr Chancellor of a Christian Social minority government. He also remained Foreign Minister of the country, until the cabinet resigned on 1 June 1921, in response to a referendum that was called in Styria proposing that the state leave Austria and join Germany, contrary to the 1919 Treaty of Saint-Germain-en-Laye.

Mayr was succeeded as chancellor by non-partisan Johann Schober, backed by the Christian-Socials and the Greater German People's Party. He died about a year later in Waldneukirchen.

== Writing ==
- W. Lazius als Geschichtsschreiber Österreichs, 1894 ("W. Lazius as Austrian Historian");
- "Der Generallandtag der österreichischen Erbländer in Augsburg 1525/26", in: Zeitschrift des Ferdinandeums 3(38), 1894 ("The General State Parliament of the Austrian Hereditary Lands in Augsburg, 1525-1526");
- Erinnerungen an A. Hofer, 1899 ("Memories of A. Hofer");
- Die Beziehungen Deutschlands zu Italien, 1901 ("The Relations of Germany with Italy");
- Der italienische Irredentismus: Sein Entstehen und seine Entwicklung vornehmlich in Tirol, 1917 ("Italian Irredentism: Its Origins and Development Primarily in Tyrol").

== See also ==
- List of members of the Austrian Parliament who died in office

Political offices
Preceded by Karl Renner	Chancellor of Austria; 1920 – 1921	Succeeded by Johann Schober
