= Centrist Democrats =

Political party in Austria

The Centrist Democrats (German: Bürgerliche Demokraten) was a political party in Austria.

== History ==
The only election contested by the party was the 1919 Constitutional Assembly elections, in which it received 1.6% of the national vote and won a single seat.
