= Democratic Association of Cities =

Political party in Austria

The Democratic Association of cities (German: Demokratische Städtevereinigung) was a political party in Austria.

== History ==
The only election contested by the party was the 1919 Constitutional Assembly elections, in which it received 0.4% of the national vote and won a single seat.
