= German Freedom and Order Party =

Defunct Austrian political party

The German Freedom and Order Party (German: Deutsche Freiheits und Ordungspartei) was a political party in Austria.

== History ==
The only election contested by the party was the 1919 Constitutional Assembly elections, in which it received 1.9% of the national vote and won five seats.
