= Provisional National Assembly =

Parliament of the Republic of German-Austria 1918-1919

Provisional National Assembly Provisorische Nationalversammlung
- Lesser coat of arms of Cisleithania (1915–1918)

Type
- Type: Part of the Imperial Council (until 12 November 1918); Unicameral transitional legislature (from 12 November 1918)

History
- Founded: 21 October 1918
- Disbanded: 16 February 1919
- Preceded by: Imperial Council
- Succeeded by: Constituent National Assembly

Leadership
- Presidium: Franz Dinghofer (DNB); Jodok Fink/Johann Hauser (CS); Karl Seitz (SDAPÖ)

Structure
- Seats: 208
- Political groups: DNB (96); CS (65); SDAPÖ (38); Independents (5); D (4)

Elections
- Last election: June and July 1911
- Next election: 16 February 1919

Meeting place
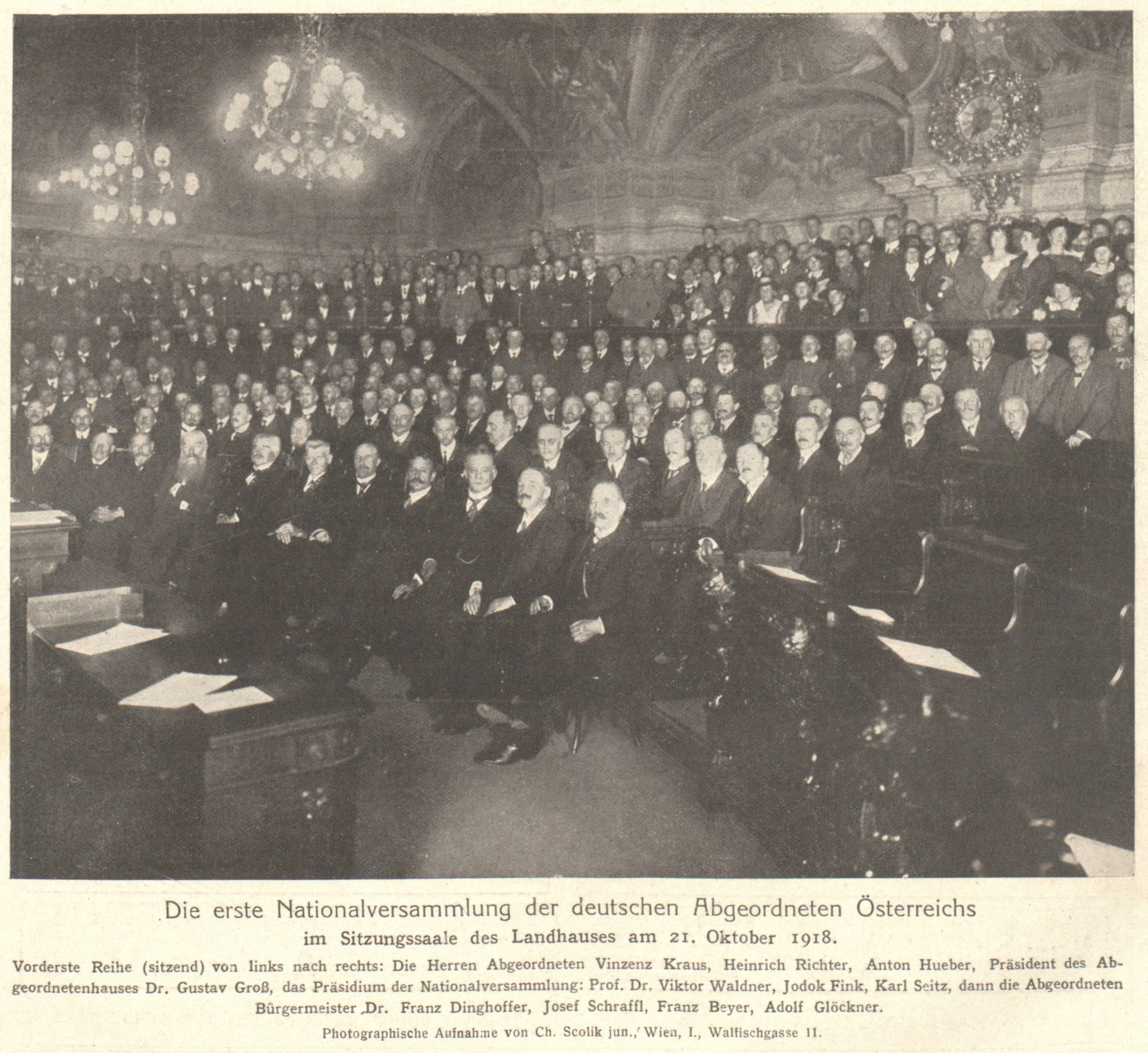
- First meeting on 21 October 1918

The Provisional National Assembly (German: Provisorische National Versammlung), unofficially also referred to as the Vienna National Assembly, was the first parliament of the Republic of German-Austria. It functioned during and after the collapse of the Austro-Hungarian Empire from 21 October 1918 to 16 February 1919. The last meeting took place on 6 February 1919 when the Geschäftsordnung for the Constituent Assembly was adopted. The assembly was composed of the members of the Chamber of Deputies of the former Imperial Council, who had represented the German-speaking areas of the Austrian half of the dual monarchy. It therefore also involved delegates whose territories were not allowed to join German-Austria because of the Treaty of St. Germain. The 208 deputies were all men; in the elections of 1911 women had not been eligible to vote yet.
