= German Peoples' Election Committee =

The German People's Election Committee (German: Deutschvölkischer Wahlausschuss) was a political party in Austria.

== History ==
The only election contested by the party was the 1919 Constitutional Assembly elections, in which it received 0.5% of the national vote and won a single seat.
