= Constituent National Assembly (Austria) =

First free-elected parliament of Austria

Constituent National Assembly Konstituierende Nationalversammlung
- Coat of arms of German-Austria

Type
- Type: Constituent assembly

History
- Founded: 16 February 1919
- Disbanded: 10 November 1920
- Preceded by: Provisional National Assembly
- Succeeded by: National Council and Federal Council

Leadership
- Chairman: Karl Seitz (SDAP)

Structure
- Seats: 170
- Political groups: SDAP (72); CS (69); DNP (26); JNP (1); VTP (1); D (1)

Elections
- Last election: 16 February 1919
- Next election: 17 October 1920

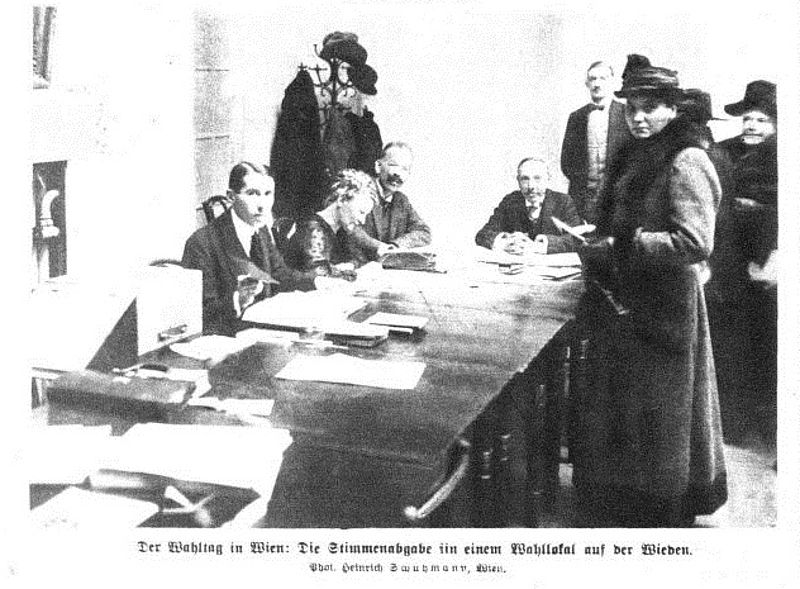
Women in Vienna voting for the Constituent National Assembly

The Constituent National Assembly (German: Konstituierende Nationalversammlung), elected on 16 February 1919, was the first parliament in Austria's history to be elected by women and men in free and equal elections. On 4 March 1919 it replaced the Provisional National Assembly based on the 1911 Imperial Council elections. The National Assembly adopted the Habsburg Act, ratified the Treaty of Saint-Germain, which sealed the collapse of Cisleithania and demanded Austria's independence from Germany. In its last meeting on 1 October 1920, the assembly created the Constitution of Austria, which is still in effect. It was the first time that women in Austria had suffrage in national elections.

On 15 March 1919, the assembly established the State Council, which consisted of the three Presidents of the National Assembly and 20 other deputies. The previous rotation between the three chairpersons of the National Assembly became defunct; the President of the National Assembly, Karl Seitz, served as head of state until the election of the first President of Austria on 9 December 1920.

Due to the new constitution, the National Assembly was replaced on 10 November 1920 by the National Council and the Federal Council. The state government became a federal government, the state law gazette became a federal law gazette, the state chancellor was replaced by the federal chancellor and the term "state secretary" was changed to "minister".
