= Liberal Corporate Association of Salzburg =

The Liberal Corporate Association of Salzburg (German: Freiheitliche Salzburger Ständebund) was a political party in Austria.

== History ==
The only election contested by the party was the 1919 Constitutional Assembly elections, in which it received 0.3% of the national vote and won a single seat.
