= 1919 Austrian Constituent Assembly election =

- 16 February 1919

All 170 seats in the Constituent Assembly 86 seats needed for a majority
- Turnout: 84.49%
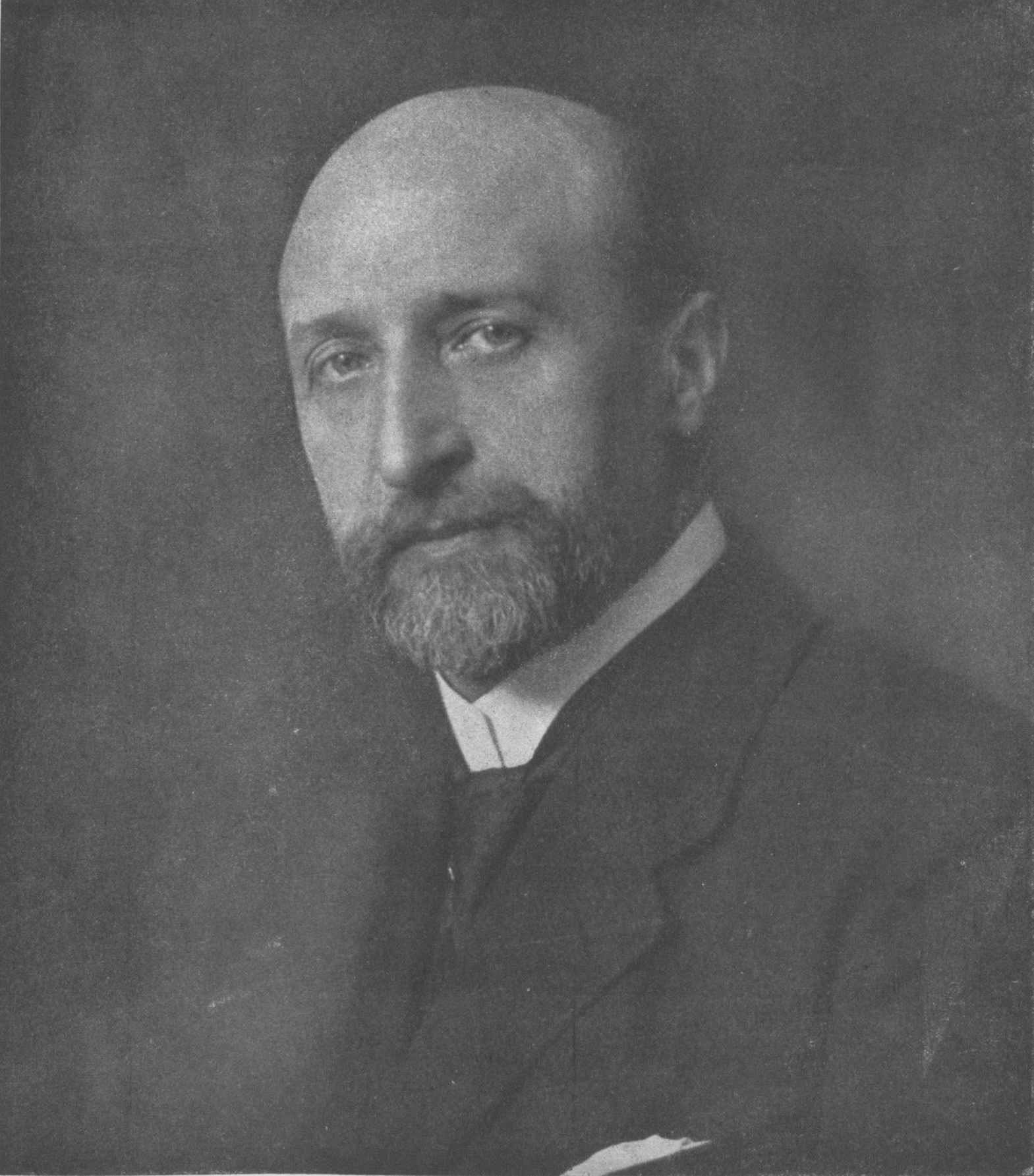

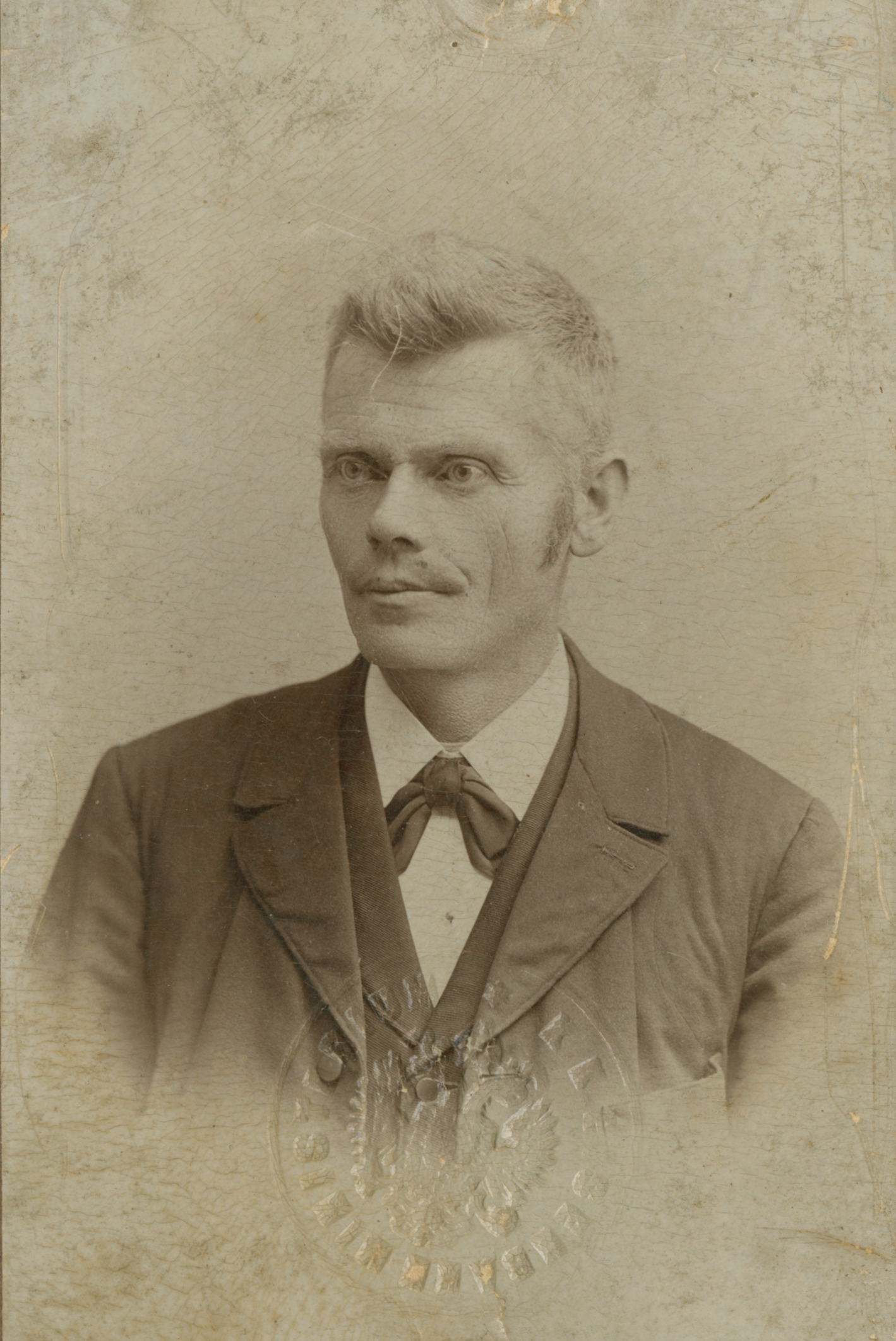

	First party	Second party	Third party
Leader	Karl Seitz	Jodok Fink
Party	SDAPÖ	CS and allies	German-Nationals
Seats won	72	69	26
Popular vote	1,211,393	1,068,259	547,058
Percentage	40.76%	35.94%	18.41%
- Results of the election, showing seats won by constituency. Constituencies are shaded according to the first-place party. Representatives were appointed in crosshatched regions (South Tyrol and Lower Styria) where elections did not take place.
Chancellor before election
Karl Renner
SDAPÖ
Elected Chancellor
Karl Renner
SDAPÖ

Constituent Assembly elections were held in Austria on 16 February 1919.

The Social Democratic Workers' Party emerged as the largest party, winning 72 of the 170 seats. The party was largely supported by the working class, whilst farmers and the middle class voted mainly for the anti-Anschluss Christian Social Party. Voter turnout was 84.4%. As Czechoslovakia prevented their eligible population from participating in the election, and Italy and Yugoslavia had gained control of South Tyrol (as a result of the 1915 Treaty of London) and Lower Styria (following border conflicts), respectively, voting only was held in small parts of those eligible territories, and representatives were instead appointed in proportion to parties' total overall vote share.

The first meeting of the assembly was on 4 March 1919. The Sudeten German Social Democrats organised a series of demonstrations in support of their right of self-determination. Across seven cities 54 persons were killed and another 84 wounded by the Czech military and police.

== Electoral system ==
The members of the Constituent National Assembly were elected in multi-member constituencies having between four and nine seats each by proportional representation. The smallest constituency was originally set to elect three seats, but did not do so due to Yugoslavia having gained control of most of Lower Styria.

This election was the first election in which all women were allowed to vote. German citizens living in Austria, Lower Styria, and South Tyrol and Sudeten Germans living in the newly-formed Czechoslovakia were also allowed to vote in the elections, despite Czechoslovak objections. Austrian citizens living in Germany were also allowed to vote in the elections for the Weimar National Assembly in the same year.

== Results ==
The two main parties, the SDAPÖ and the CS, formed a coalition government after the elections. Although it had broken up by mid-1920, it was followed for a short time by a transitional coalition of SDAPÖ, CS, and the Greater German People's Party, a successor of the German People's Party following a merger with the Greater German Union. Ultimately, a new constitution was agreed on 1 October 1920. Fresh elections were held on 17 October.

Party or alliance		Votes	%	Seats
Social Democratic Workers' Party		1,211,393	40.76	72
Christian Social; Party and allies	Christian Social Party	687,465	23.13	47
Christian Social; Party and allies	Lower Austrian Farmers' Union	222,304	7.48	12
Christian Social; Party and allies	Christian Social Citizens' and Workers' Party	62,099	2.09	0
Christian Social; Party and allies	Tyrolean Farmers' Association	50,361	1.69	3
Christian Social; Party and allies	Tyrolean People's Club	46,030	1.55	7
Christian Social; Party and allies	Total	1,068,259	35.94	69
German-National parties	German-National Party	174,738	5.88	8
German-National parties	German Democrats	64,073	2.16	3
German-National parties	German People's Party	59,919	2.02	2
German-National parties	German Freedom and Order Party	56,306	1.89	5
German-National parties	Styrian Farmers' Party	47,021	1.58	3
German-National parties	National Democrats	46,507	1.56	0
German-National parties	Carinthian Farmers' Association	33,496	1.13	2
German-National parties	National Socialist Workers' Party	23,252	0.78	0
German-National parties	German Peoples' Election Committee	15,430	0.52	1
German-National parties	Democratic Association of Cities	12,336	0.42	1
German-National parties	Free Salzburg Farmers' League	8,507	0.29	1
German-National parties	Democratic Economic Party	3,828	0.13	0
German-National parties	German-Austrian People's Party	1,645	0.06	0
German-National parties	Total	547,058	18.41	26
Democratic parties	Centrist Democrats	48,995	1.65	1
Democratic parties	Democratic Party	15,053	0.51	0
Democratic parties	Democratic Middle-Class Party	5,960	0.20	0
Democratic parties	Economic People's Party	411	0.01	0
Democratic parties	Total	70,419	2.37	1
United Czechoslovak Parties		67,396	2.27	1
Jewish National Party		7,770	0.26	1
Total		2,972,295	100.00	170
Valid votes		2,972,295	99.16	
Invalid/blank votes		25,239	0.84	
Total votes		2,997,534	100.00	
Registered voters/turnout		3,547,742	84.49	
Source: Government of Austria
