= Karl Renner =

Austrian statesman (1870–1950)

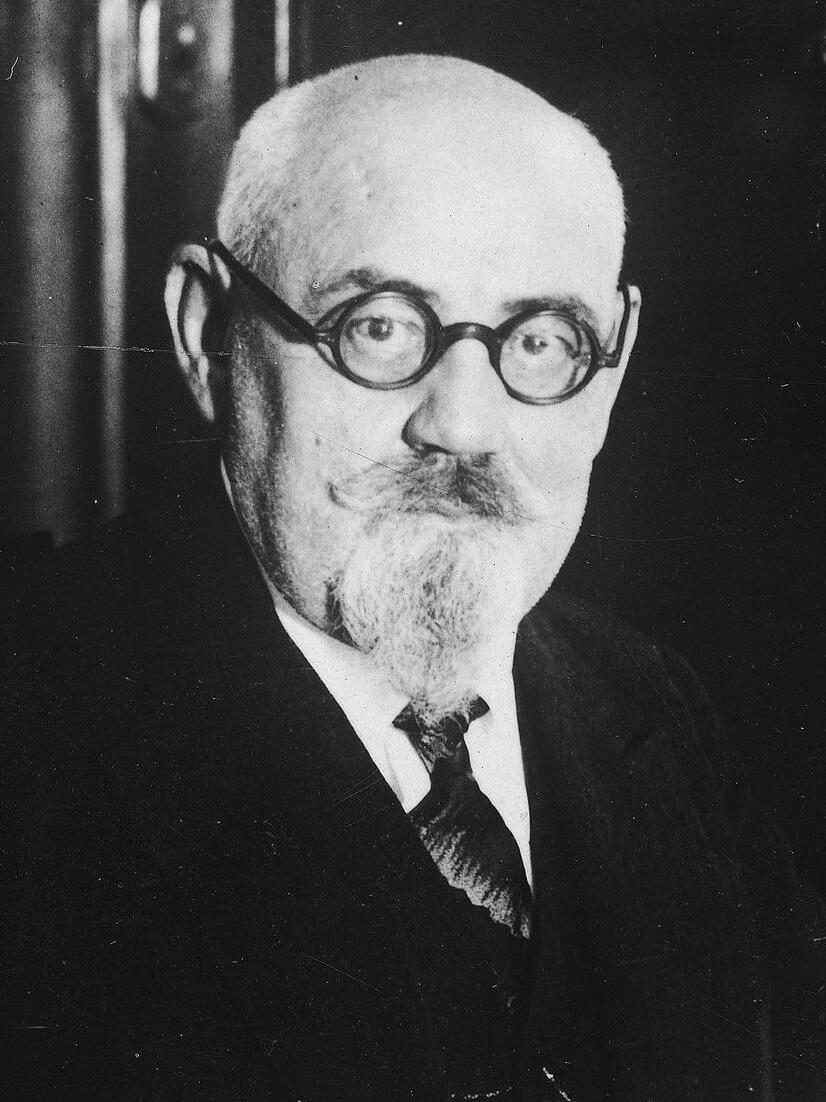
- Karl Renner in 1931

President of Austria
- In office 20 December 1945 – 31 December 1950
- Chancellor: Leopold Figl
- Preceded by: Wilhelm Miklas (1938)
- Succeeded by: Theodor Körner

Chancellor of Austria
- In office 27 April 1945 – 20 December 1945
- Vice-Chancellor: Leopold Figl; Johann Koplenig; Adolf Schärf
- Preceded by: Arthur Seyss-Inquart (1938)
- Succeeded by: Leopold Figl
- In office 21 October 1919 – 7 July 1920
- Vice-Chancellor: Jodok Fink
- Preceded by: Himself as Chancellor of German-Austria
- Succeeded by: Michael Mayr

Chancellor of German-Austria
- In office 30 October 1918 – 21 October 1919
- Appointed by: State Council
- Vice-Chancellor: Jodok Fink
- Preceded by: Office established
- Succeeded by: Himself as Chancellor of Austria

President of the National Council
- In office 29 April 1931 – 4 March 1933
- Preceded by: Matthias Eldersch
- Succeeded by: Leopold Kunschak (1945)

Minister of Foreign Affairs
- In office 26 July 1919 – 22 October 1920
- Preceded by: Otto Bauer
- Succeeded by: Michael Mayr

Minister of the Interior and Education
- In office 15 March 1919 – 9 May 1919
- Succeeded by: Matthias Eldersch
- Preceded by: Heinrich Mataja (Interior); Raphael Pacher (Education)

Personal details
- Born: 14 December 1870 Unter-Tannowitz, Austria-Hungary (now Dolní Dunajovice, Czech Republic)
- Died: 31 December 1950 (aged 80) Vienna, Austria
- Party: Social Democratic Workers' Party
- Spouse: Luise Renner
- Occupation: Jurist

Karl Renner (14 December 1870 – 31 December 1950) was an Austrian politician and jurist of the Social Democratic Workers' Party of Austria. He is often referred to as the "Father of the Republics" because he led the first government of the Republic of German-Austria and the First Austrian Republic in 1919 and 1920, and was once again decisive in establishing the present Second Republic after the fall of Nazi Germany in 1945, becoming its first President after World War II (and fourth overall).

== Early life ==
Renner was born the 18th child of an ethnic German family of poor wine-growers in Unter-Tannowitz (present-day Dolní Dunajovice in the Czech Republic), then part of the Margraviate of Moravia, a crown land of the Austro-Hungarian Empire. Because of his intelligence, he was allowed to attend a selective gymnasium in nearby Nikolsburg (Mikulov), where one of his teachers was Wilhelm Jerusalem. From 1890 to 1896 he studied law at the University of Vienna. In 1895 he was one of the founding members of the Friends of Nature (German: Naturfreunde) organisation and created their logo.

== Political career ==
In 1896, he joined the Social Democratic Workers' Party of Austria (SDAP), representing the party in the National Council (German: Reichsrat) from the 1907 elections until its dissolution in November 1918. During this period he founded and edited the party's journal, Der Kampf, together with Otto Bauer and Adolf Braun. Renner's interest in politics also led him to become a librarian for the Reichsrat. During these early years, he developed new perspectives on law — all the while cloaking his innovative ideas under a variety of pseudonyms (for example, Synopticus and Rudolf Springer) lest he lose his coveted post as parliamentary librarian. He was especially interested in the problems of the Austrian state, whose existence he justified on geographical, economic and political grounds. On the nationality question, he upheld the so-called "personal autonomy" on the basis of which the super-national state should develop, and thereby influenced the agenda and tactics of the Social Democratic Party in dealing with it. As a theorist he was reckoned as one of the leaders of Austro-Marxism.

=== First Republic ===
In 1918, after the collapse of the Austro-Hungarian Empire, he was in the forefront of the Provisional and the Constitutional National Assemblies of those Cisleithanian "Lands Represented in the Reichsrat" (the formal description of the Austrian half of the Dual Monarchy) that predominantly spoke German and had decided to form a nation-state like the other nationalities had done. Renner became the first head of government ("State Chancellor") of that newly established small German-speaking republic which refused to be considered the heir of the Habsburg monarchy and wished to be known as the Republic of German-Austria (German: Republik Deutsch-Österreich). This name, however, was prohibited by The Entente. They also vetoed a resolution of the Constituent National Assembly in Vienna that "German-Austria" was to be part of the German Weimar Republic. Even before the collapse of the Austro-Hungarian Monarchy, Renner had proposed a future union of the German parts of Austria with Germany, even using the word "Anschluss". Like other Austrian socialists, Renner believed that the best course was to seek union with Germany.

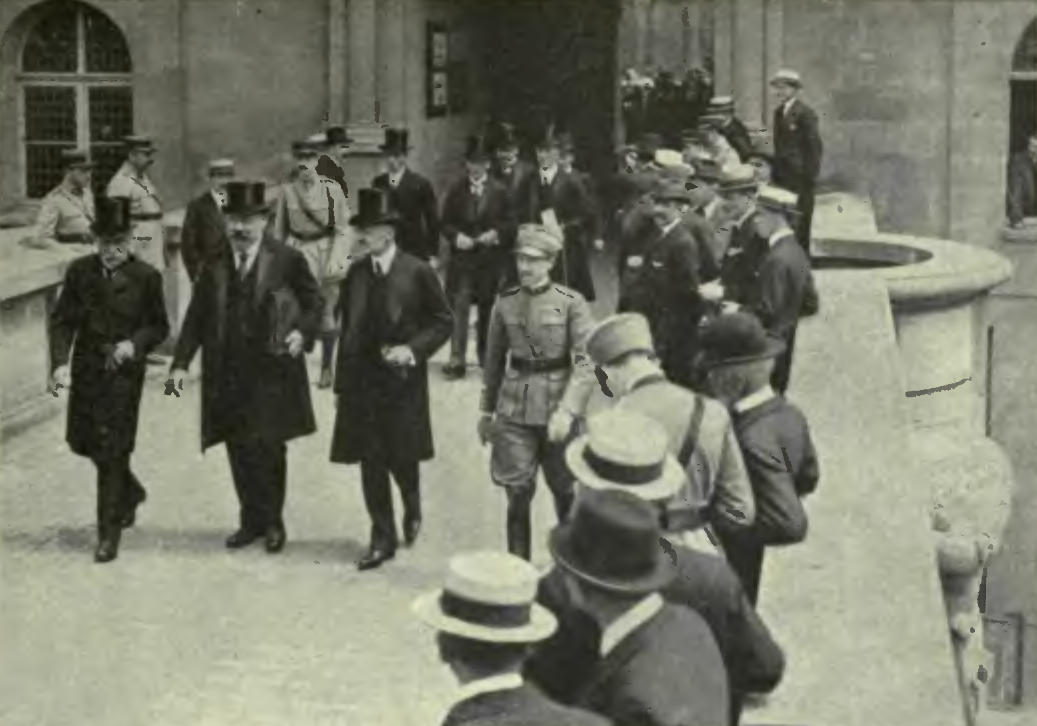
Renner (centre) leaving the Château de Saint-Germain, having signed the treaty

He was the leader of the delegation that represented this new German-Austria in the negotiations of St. Germain where the "Republic of Austria" was acknowledged but was declared to be the responsible successor to Imperial Austria. There Renner had to accept that this new Austria was prohibited any political association with Germany and he had to accept the loss of German-speaking South Tyrol and the German-speaking parts of Bohemia and Moravia where he himself was born; this forced him to give up his share in the parental farm if he, "the peasant proprietor who turned Marxist", wanted to remain an Austrian government officer.

Renner was Chancellor of Austria of the first three coalition cabinets from 1918 until 1920 and at the same time Minister of Foreign Affairs, backed by a grand coalition of Social Democrats and Christian Social Party. A wide range of social reforms were introduced by Renner's government, including unemployment insurance, paid holidays, the eight-hour workday, and regulations on the working conditions of miners, bakers, women, and children. State aid was also provided for the disabled, together with health insurance for public employees. In addition, a law was passed that provided for collective bargaining and the mediation of disputes.

From 1931 to 1933, Renner was President of Parliament, the National Council of Austria. After the dictatorial Corporate State period from 1934, when his party was prohibited, he even welcomed the Anschluss in 1938. Having originally been a proponent of new German-Austria becoming a part of the democratic German Republic, he expected Nazism to be but a passing phenomenon not worse than the dictatorship of Engelbert Dollfuss's and Kurt Schuschnigg's authoritarian one-party system. During World War II, however, he distanced himself from politics completely.

=== Relationship with Nazism and Communism ===
On 2 April 1938, Renner appealed to Austrians to vote yes in the 10 April plebiscite that sought to legitimize the Anschluss. After the Anschluss, Renner offered to serve in the Nazi government during the occupation, but his offer was declined. During the occupation, according to official Austrian figures, 51,500 Austrian Jews out of a total of 200,000 were killed in concentration camps, which, as documented during the Nuremberg war-crimes trials, had a disproportionately large number of Austrian guards.

On 29 March 1945, Soviet commander Fyodor Tolbukhin's troops crossed the former Austrian border at Klostermarienberg in Burgenland. On 3 April, at the beginning of the Vienna offensive, Renner, then living in southern Lower Austria, established contact with the Soviets. Joseph Stalin had already established a would-be future Austrian cabinet from the country's communists in exile, but Tolbukhin's telegram changed Stalin's mind in favour of Renner.

On 20 April 1945, the Soviets, without asking their Western allies, instructed Renner to form a provisional government. Seven days later Renner's cabinet took office, declared the independence of Austria from Nazi Germany and called for the creation of a democratic state along the lines of the First Austrian Republic. Soviet acceptance of Renner was not an isolated episode; their officers re-established district administrations and appointed local mayors, frequently following the advice of the locals, even before the battle was over.

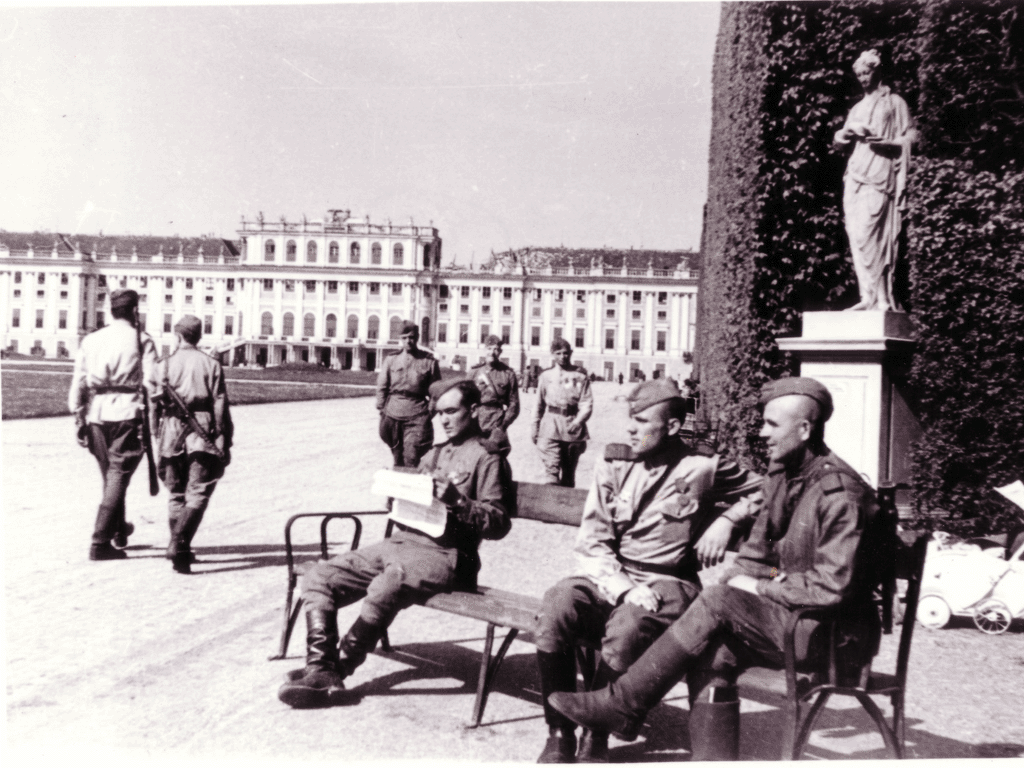
Soviet troops in the Schönbrunn Palace gardens, 1945

Renner and his ministers were guarded and watched by NKVD bodyguards. One-third of State Chancellor Renner's cabinet, including the crucial seats of the Secretary of State of the Interior and the Secretary of State for Education, was staffed by Austrian Communists. The Western allies suspected the establishment of a puppet state and did not recognize Renner. The British were particularly hostile, and even American President Harry S. Truman, who believed that Renner was a trustworthy politician rather than a token front for the Kremlin, denied him recognition. However, Renner had secured multi-party control of the government by designating two Under-Secretaries of State in each of the ministries, appointed by the two parties not designating the Secretary of State.

=== Post–World War II ===
Renner's government opted to restore the 1920 Constitution, as amended in 1929. However, following elections that November, the Federal Assembly temporarily suspended the provision calling for the president to be popularly elected, and elected Renner as president on 20 November. Karl Renner died in 1950 in Vienna and was buried in the Presidential Tomb at the Zentralfriedhof.

== Antisemitism ==
Antisemitism in contemporary Austria was widespread after the First World War and even after the Second World War, even in the highest government offices. Karl Renner, whom Emperor Karl I rejected as prime minister, stood out before and after the war due to vehement antisemitism. This attitude persisted even after the Nazi terror against Jewish returnees and survivors of the concentration camps. Marko Feingold, survivor of the concentration camp and president of the Salzburg Jewish Community, said in 2013: "Karl Renner, after all the first Federal President of the Second Republic, had long been known in the party as an anti-Semite. He didn't want us concentration campers in Vienna after the war and he also frankly said that Austria would not give anything back to them."

== Political beliefs and scholarly contributions ==
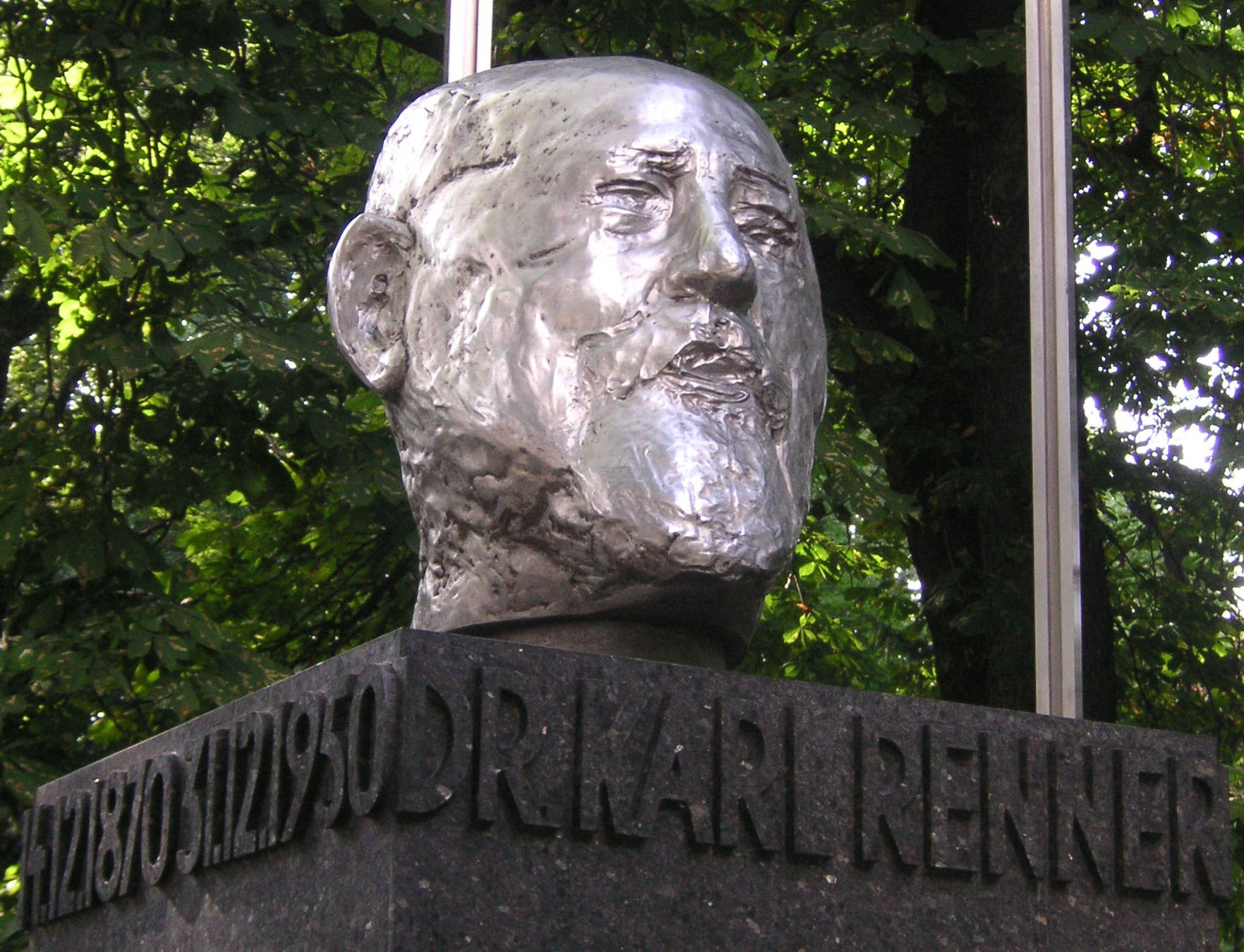
Monument to Karl Renner next to the Austrian Parliament on Ringstraße, Vienna, Austria

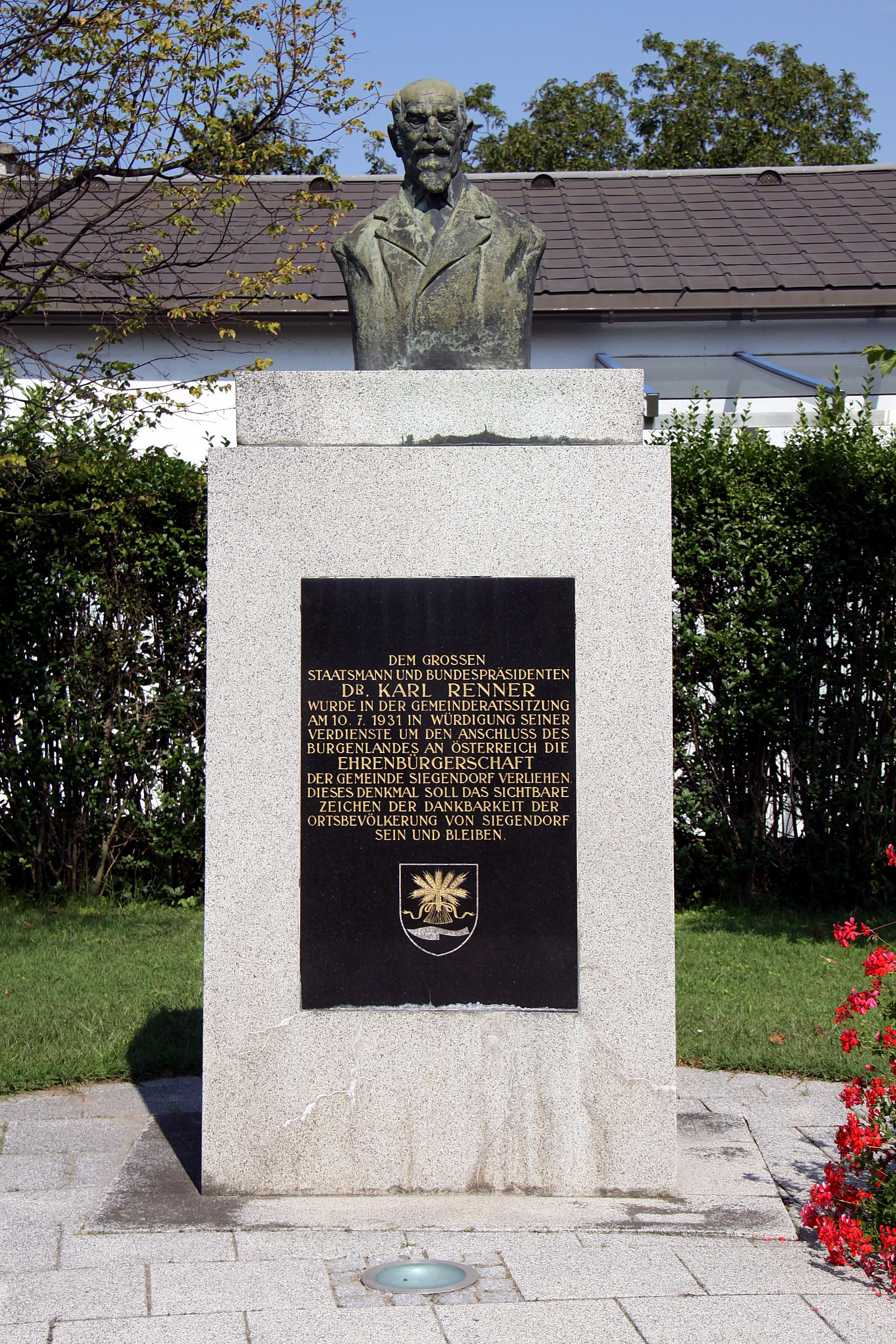
Monument to Karl Renner in Siegendorf, Burgenland

For most of his life, Renner alternated between the political commitment of a social democrat and the analytical distance of an academic scholar. Central to Renner's academic work is the problem of the relationship between private law and private property. With his Rechtsinstitute des Privatrechts und ihre soziale Funktion. Ein Beitrag zur Kritik des bürgerlichen Rechts [The Institutions of Private Law and their Social Functions] (1904), he became one of the founders of the discipline of the sociology of law. In this book, Renner developed a Marxist theory of the institution of private law. Renner argued that the separation of public and private law is a creation of capitalism, whereby the state enforces the interests of capital owners.

His and Otto Bauer's ideas about the legal protection of cultural minorities were taken up by the Jewish Bund, but fiercely denounced by Vladimir Lenin. Joseph Stalin devoted a whole chapter to criticising Cultural National Autonomy in Marxism and the National Question.

== Death and legacy ==
Renner died on 31 December 1950.

The 1977–1978 academic year at the College of Europe was named in his honour.

The Karl Renner Institute was founded on the initiative of the Chancellor of Austria, Bruno Kreisky, as the political academy of the SPÖ (Social Democratic Party). Kreisky was the founding president of the institute; later chancellors Fred Sinowatz, Franz Vranitzky, and Viktor Klima also held the role. State offices were established in all federal states in 1973 and 1974, while the headquarters occupied a series of premises in Vienna. In December 2018, the institute moved to a new building in the newly-founded district of Quartier Belvedere, right next to Vienna Central Station.

== Publications ==
- Synopticus (pen name), Staat und Nation (Vienna, 1899). Reprinted as "State and Nation" in Ephraim Nimni (ed.), National Cultural Autonomy and Its Contemporary Critics, London: Routledge, 2005 pp. 64 – 82 ISBN 0-415-24964-3
- Rudolf Springer (pen name), Der Kampf der oesterreichischen Nationen um den Staat (1902)
- Joseph Karner (pen name), "Die Soziale Funktion der Rechtsinstitute" (1904) in Marx-Studien, vol. 1.
- Grundlagen und Entwicklungsziele der österreichischen-ungarischen Monarchie, die Krise des Dualismus, ("Foundations and development goals of the Austro-Hungarian monarchy: the crisis of dualism"; 1904)
- Österreichs Erneuerung ("Austria's renewal"; 3 vols., 1916/17)
- Marxismus, Krieg und Internationale (1918)
- Die Wirtschaft als Gesamtprozess und die Sozialisierung ("The economy as an integrated process and the path to socialism"; 1924)
- Staatswirtschaft, Weltwirtschaft und Sozialismus ("The national economy, the world economy and socialism"; 1929)
- Die Rechtsinstitute des Privatrechts und ihre soziale Funktion (1929); translated into English by Agnes Schwarzschild as The Institutions of Private Law and their Social Function, with an introduction by Otto Kahn-Freund, London: Routledge & Kegan Paul (1949); reprinted in International Library of Sociology (1976; 1996)
- Wege der Verwirklichung ("The way to realization", 1929)
- An der Wende zweier Zeiten. Lebenserinnerungen ("At the turning points in two eras: life recollections"), 2 vols. Vienna: Braumüller 1946

Literary remains (unpublished works; German: Nachgelassene Werke):

- ' Wandlungen der modernen Gesellschaft ("Transformations of modern society," 1947)
- Hundert Jahre Karl Marx: Erbe und Auftrag ("100 years of Karl Marx: Heritage and Agenda"; 1947)
- Arbeit und Kapital (1950) Vol. 3, Vienna: 1953, reprint European Sociology 1975
- Porträt einer Evolution in Nachgelassene Werke, vol. 2, edited by Adolf Schärf, Vienna: Verlag der Wiener Volksbuchhandlung, 1953.

== See also ==
- Allied-administered Austria
- National personal autonomy

Political offices
Preceded by Heinrich Lammasch as Minister-President of Austria	Chancellor of Austria; 1918 – 1920	Succeeded by Michael Mayr
Vacant Annexation by Germany Title last held by Arthur Seyß-Inquart	Chancellor of Austria; 1945	Succeeded by Leopold Figl
Vacant Annexation by Germany Title last held by Wilhelm Miklas	State President of Austria; 1945 – 1950	Succeeded by Theodor Körner
