= Karl Seitz =

Austrian politician (1869-1950)

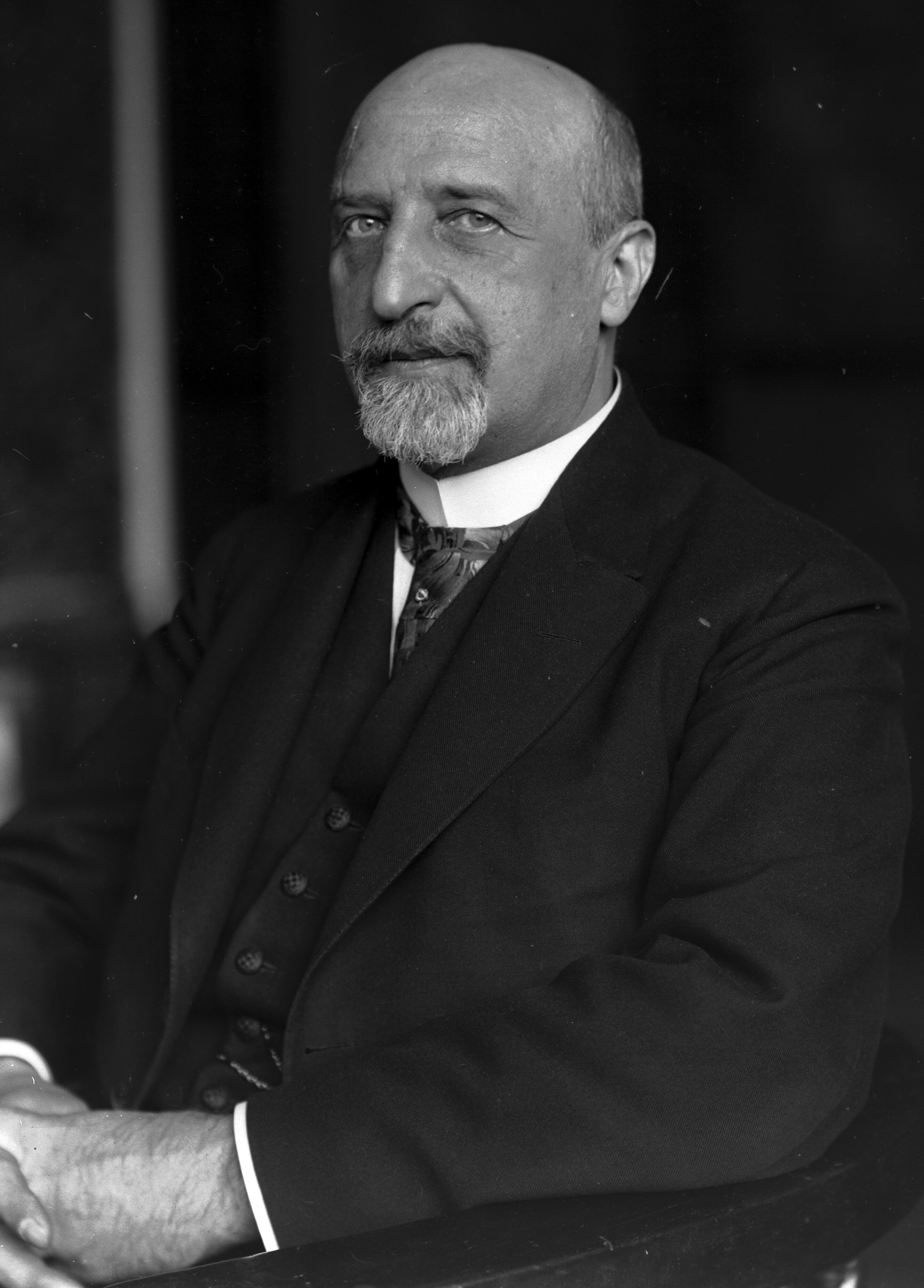
- Seitz photographed by Ferdinand Schmutzer, 1925

President of Austria
- De facto 10 November 1920 – 9 December 1920
- Chancellor: Michael Mayr
- Preceded by: Office established
- Succeeded by: Michael Hainisch

Mayor and Governor of Vienna
- In office 13 November 1923 – 12 February 1934
- Preceded by: Jakob Reumann
- Succeeded by: Richard Schmitz

Second President of the National Council
- In office 15 December 1920 – 20 November 1923
- Preceded by: Matthias Eldersch
- Succeeded by: Matthias Eldersch

President of the Constituent National Assembly
- In office 5 March 1919 – 9 November 1920
- Preceded by: Office established
- Succeeded by: Office abolished

President of the Provisional National Assembly
- In office 21 October 1918 – 16 February 1919 Serving with Franz Dinghofer, Jodok Fink/Johann Hauser
- Preceded by: Office established
- Succeeded by: Office abolished

Personal details
- Born: Karl Josef Seitz; 4 September 1869 Vienna, Austria-Hungary
- Died: 3 February 1950 (aged 80) Vienna, Austria
- Party: Social Democratic Workers' Party
- Spouse: Emilie Heindl

Karl Josef Seitz (German pronunciation: [kaʁl ˈzaɪts]; 4 September 1869 – 3 February 1950) was an Austrian politician of the Social Democratic Workers' Party. He served as member of the Imperial Council, President of the National Council and Mayor of Vienna.

== Early life ==
Seitz was born in Vienna, the capital of Austria-Hungary. He was the son of a struggling small-time coal trader. After the premature death of his father in 1875, the family was thrown into abject poverty, and Seitz had to be sent off to an orphanage.

He, nonetheless, received adequate education and earned a scholarship so that he could enroll in a teacher-training college in the city of St. Pölten, Lower Austria. In 1888, he took employment as a public elementary school teacher in Vienna.

Already an outspoken social democrat, he was disciplined several times for his political activism. His founding of a Social Democratic teachers' union in 1896 led to his delegation into the Lower Austrian Board of Education in 1897, which then led to his termination as a teacher later that year.

== Early political career ==
Seitz now turned to full-time politics and established himself as one of the party's most eminent experts on educational policy. In 1901, Seitz was elected to the Imperial Council and, in 1902, to the provincial parliament of Lower Austria. Following the outbreak of World War I in 1914, Seitz developed pronounced pacifist leanings and participated in the 1917 Stockholm Socialists' Congress.

Seitz entered history in 1918, when Austria-Hungary was breaking down, and its disintegration into smaller independent nation states was becoming manifest. On 21 October 1918, the Imperial Council members, representing the empire's ethnically-German provinces, moved to form a Provisional National Assembly for "German Austria". In its constituent session, the Provisional National Assembly appointed Seitz as one of its three chairmen. All three presidents together functioned as head of state in the Staatsratsdirektorium. After the election to the Constituent National Assembly, the law was changed on 15 March 1919. Seitz became the First President, and the other two presidents became deputies of the First President. The First President was also to be the head of state. He retained the position until 9 December 1920.

== President ==
Almost simultaneously, Seitz was also appointed provisional chairman of the Social Democratic Workers' Party of Austria after the death of the party's nestor Victor Adler. In 1919, his positions both as President of Austria and as party chairman were formalised.

Following the implementation of the definitive Constitution of Austria on 1 October 1920, Seitz declined to seek re-election. He left office on 9 December but did not retire from politics and retained both his party chairmanship and his seat in the newly established National Council. Seitz now devoted his attention to Vienna's local affairs.

== Mayor of Vienna ==
On 13 November 1923, he was elected Mayor of Vienna.

The extensive and competently administered public welfare and education programs that he implemented, particularly promoting the building of residences, were very popular, even by his party's opponents, and they were positively remembered for decades.

== Personal life ==
Karl Seitz married Emma Seidel, daughter of Amalie Seidel, one of the first women members of the Austrian parliament.

== Later life ==
With the rise of the Fatherland Front in 1934 and the Social Democrats' failed insurrection against the federal government, the Social Democratic Workers' Party was outlawed. Having thus lost his party chairmanship, Seitz was also removed from his post as a mayor, taken into custody and released without charge a few weeks later. Even though a majority of Viennese considered his removal from office illegitimate, Seitz's political career had essentially been brought to an end.

Continuing to live in Vienna, Seitz witnessed the Anschluss with Nazi Germany in 1938 and the outbreak of World War II in 1939. There were contacts with the important resistance group (Maier-Mesner group, CASSIA) around the later-executed priest Heinrich Maier, who was in contact with the American secret service Office of Strategic Services (OSS). Maier had set up an information network to receive important information and to realise political plans for after the war. In 1944, he was placed under arrest a second time and, for a time, was even imprisoned in the Ravensbrück concentration camp, only to again return to Vienna when Nazi Germany eventually collapsed in May 1945. Though now ill, Seitz served the newly established Social Democratic Party of Austria as its honorary chairman and a nominal National Council member until his death, at the age of 80.

Political offices
Preceded by Matthias Eldersch	Second President of the National Council; 1920–1923	Succeeded by Matthias Eldersch
Preceded by Jakob Reumann	Mayor and Governor of Vienna; 1923–1934	Succeeded by Richard Schmitz
