= 1920 Austrian legislative election =

- 17 October 1920

All 183 seats in the National Council 92 seats needed for a majority
- Turnout: 80.27%
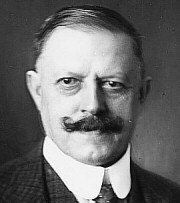

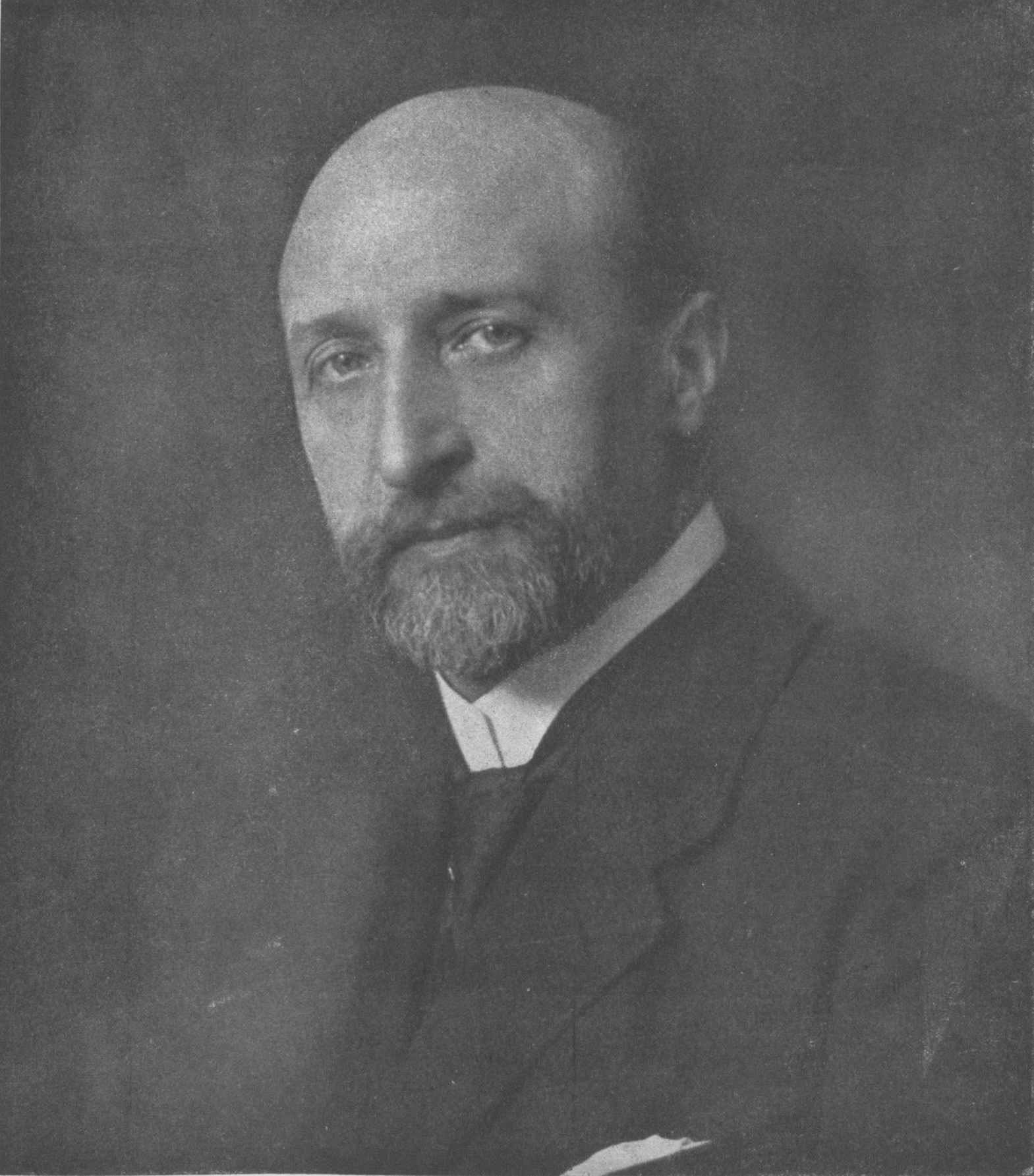

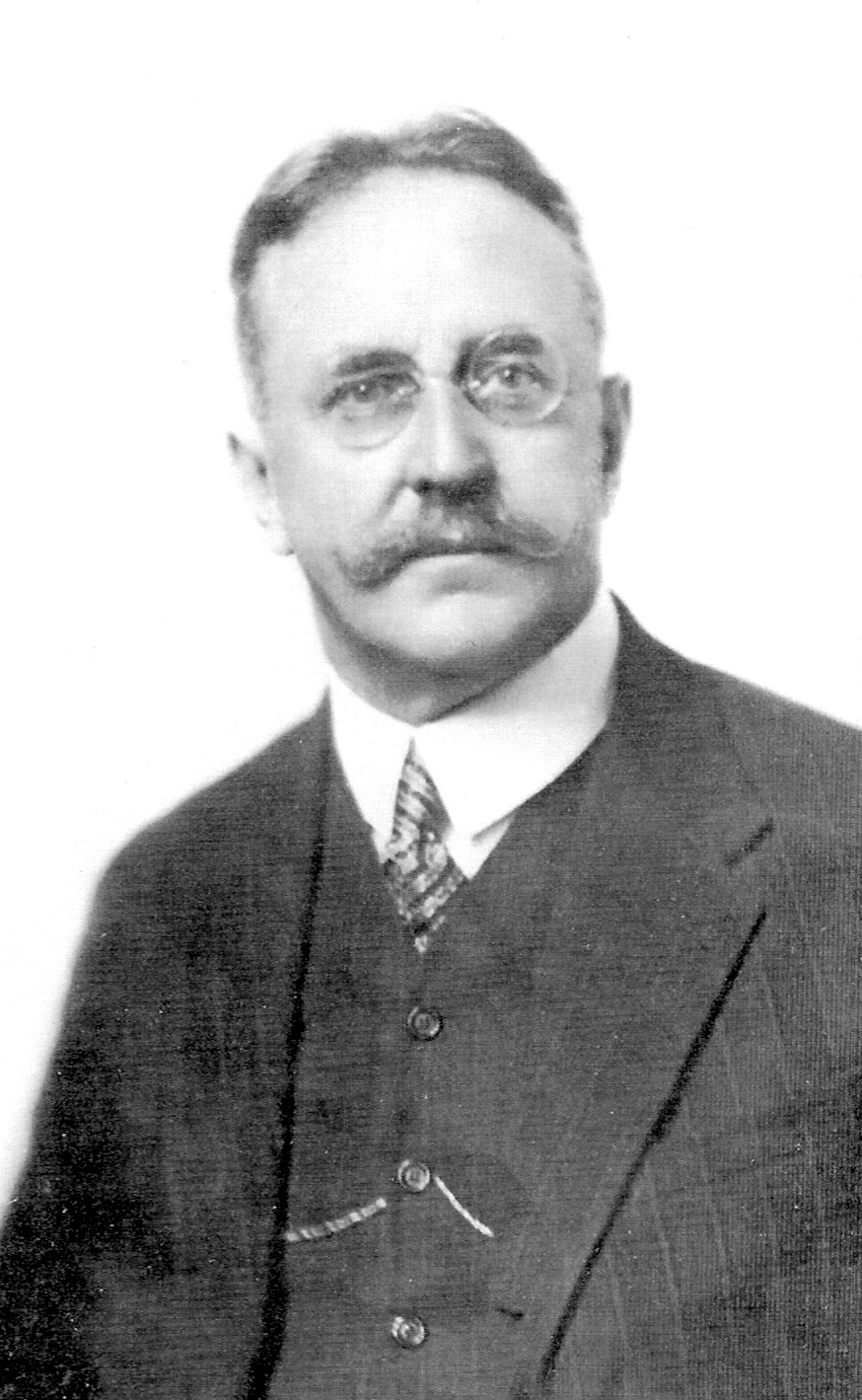
	First party	Second party	Third party
Leader	Michael Mayr	Karl Seitz	Franz Dinghofer
Party	CS	SDAPÖ	GDVP
Last election	35.93%, 69 seats	40.75%, 72 seats	–
Seats won	85	69	21
Seat change	▲16	▼3	New
Popular vote	1,245,531	1,072,709	390,013
Percentage	41.79%	35.99%	13.08%
Swing	▲5.86 pp	▼4.76 pp	New
Chancellor before election
Michael Mayr
CS
Elected Chancellor
Michael Mayr
CS

Parliamentary elections were held in Austria on 17 October 1920, although they were not held in Carinthia until 19 June 1921 and in Burgenland until 18 June 1922. They were the first regular elections held after a permanent constitution was promulgated two weeks earlier.

The result was a victory for the Christian Social Party, which won 85 of the 183 seats. Voter turnout was 80%.

== Results ==
Following the election, a coalition was formed between the CS and GDVP.

Party	Votes	%	Seats	+/–
Christian Social Party	1,245,531	41.79	85	+16
Social Democratic Workers' Party	1,072,709	35.99	69	−3
Greater German People's Party	390,013	13.09	21	New
Landbund	124,114	4.16	7	New
Civic Workers' Party	42,826	1.44	1	New
Democrats	42,826	1.44	0	0
Burgenland Citizens' and Farmers' Party	42,826	1.44	0	New
Communist Party of Austria	27,386	0.92	0	New
Socialist and Democratic Czechoslovaks	7,580	0.25	0	−1
Christian National Unity List	70,169	2.35	0	New
Jewish National Party	70,169	2.35	0	−1
Carinthian Slovenes	70,169	2.35	0	New
Total	2,980,328	100.00	183	+13
Valid votes	2,980,328	98.96		
Invalid/blank votes	31,455	1.04		
Total votes	3,011,783	100.00		
Registered voters/turnout	3,752,212	80.27		
Source: Mackie & Rose, Nohlen & Stöver
