= Mayreder =

Mayreder is a surname. Notable people with the surname include:

- Julius Mayreder (1860–1911), Austrian architect
- Karl Mayreder (1856–1935), Austrian architect
- Rosa Mayreder (1858–1938), Austrian freethinker, author, painter, musician, and feminist
