= Döbling Carmelite Monastery =

Church building in Döbling, Austria

Coordinates: 48°14′51″N 16°20′59″E

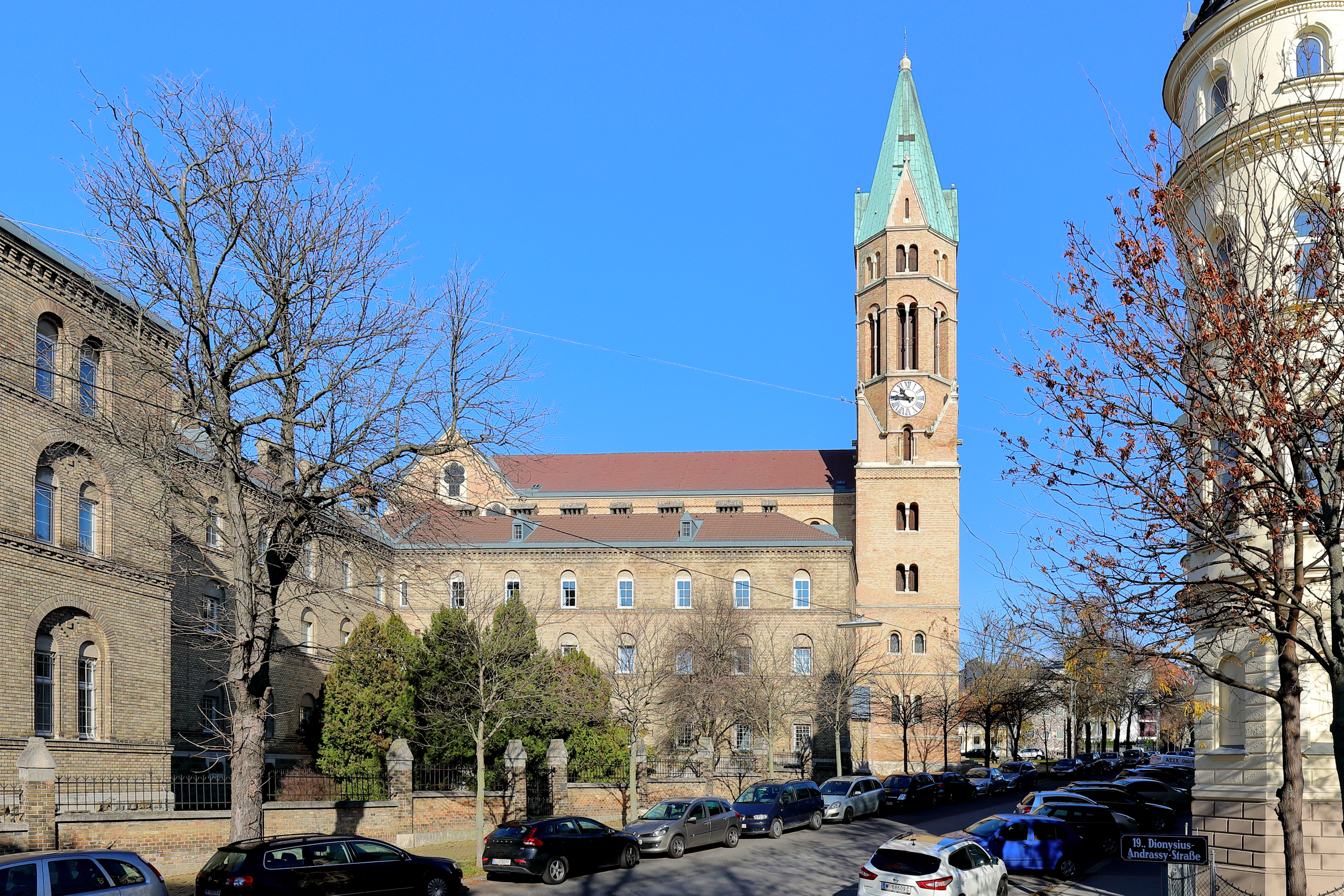
Döbling Carmelite Nunnery

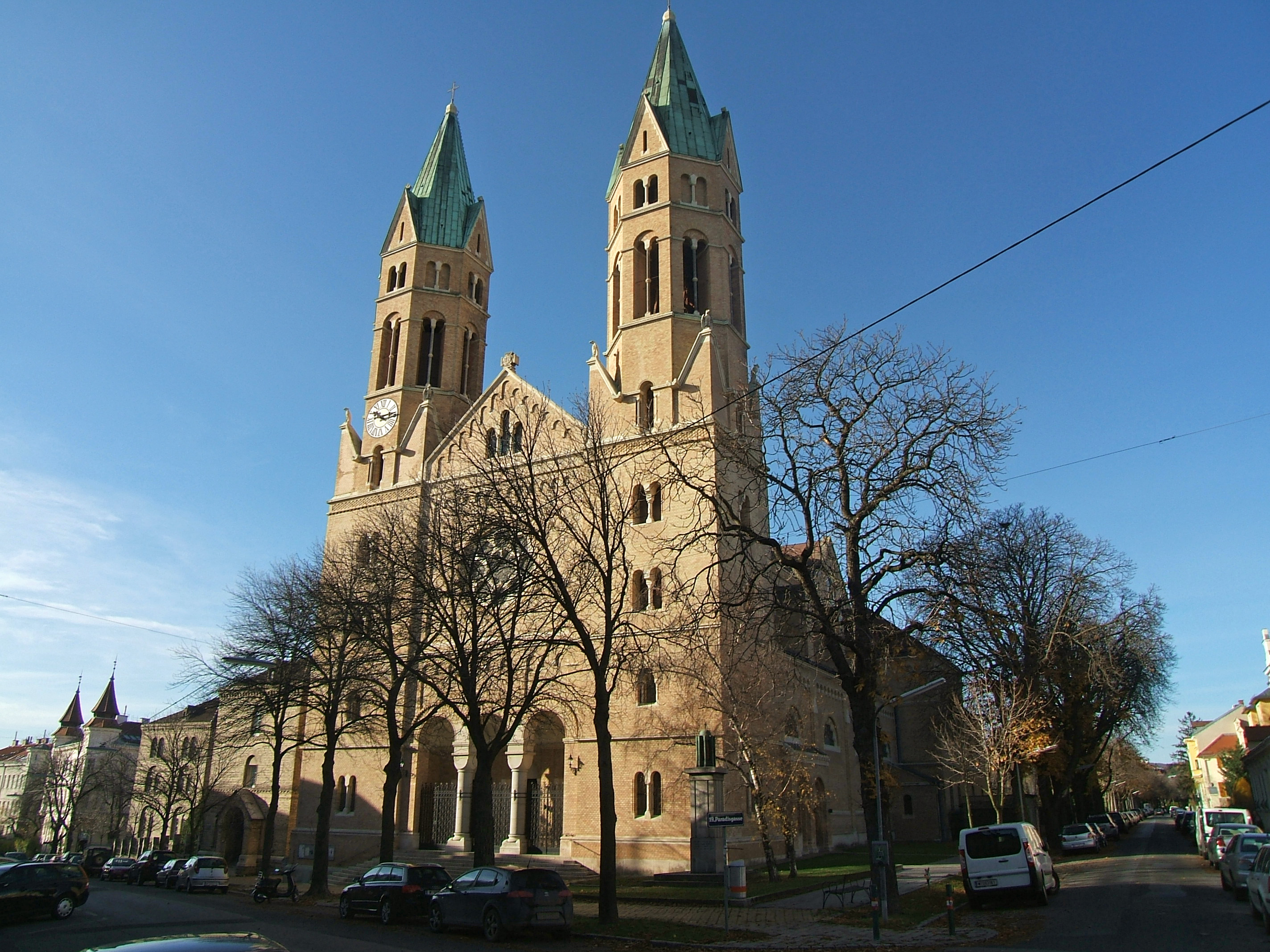
Döbling Carmelite Church

The Döbling Carmelite Monastery (Karmelitenkloster Döbling) is an Austrian monastery belonging to the Teresian Carmelites, a reformed branch of the Carmelites that arose out of the reform of the Carmelite Order by two Spanish saints, St. Teresa of Ávila and St. John of the Cross; the Teresian Carmelites thus belong to the Discalced Carmelites (Ordo Carmelitarum Discalceatorum). The monastery stands next to a Roman Catholic church in the suburb of Unterdöbling in the 19th district of Vienna, Döbling.

== History of the monastery ==
The first monastery belonging to the Discalced Carmelites was founded in Austria on 4 February 1622 in Leopoldstadt (see Karmeliterviertel). This was made possible by Ferdinand II and his wife Eleonora, but after Joseph II dissolved the Carmelite convent, along with many other monasteries, the order was only able to maintain a single parish. Later, this parish also passed to the lay clergy. The monastery building was later torn down, but the former monastery church is still used as a parish church.

It was not until the end of the 19th century that the order found a new home in Döbling. The Karmelitenkloster Döbling was built in the Silbergasse in Unterdöbling between 1898 and 1901. It was financed from the state religion fund.

== Construction ==
Work began on the monastery and church, which had been designed by architect Richard Jordan, in 1898. The church was built with a nave with four sets of pillars and a double tower facade. The nave is 40 metres long and 20 metres wide. Jordan made particular use of forms found in Romanesque architecture in his construction. The interior of the church is particularly impressive because of the use of Art Nouveau and Art Deco. In addition to a main altar, six secondary altars and a chapel, the church boasts a pulpit in carrara marble made by Ludwig Schadler and decorated with the four original Doctors of the Church – Saint Ambrose, Saint Augustine, Saint Jerome, and Pope Gregory I, although the figure of Pope Gregory resembles Pope Leo XIII, during whose papacy the church was erected.

== The main altar ==
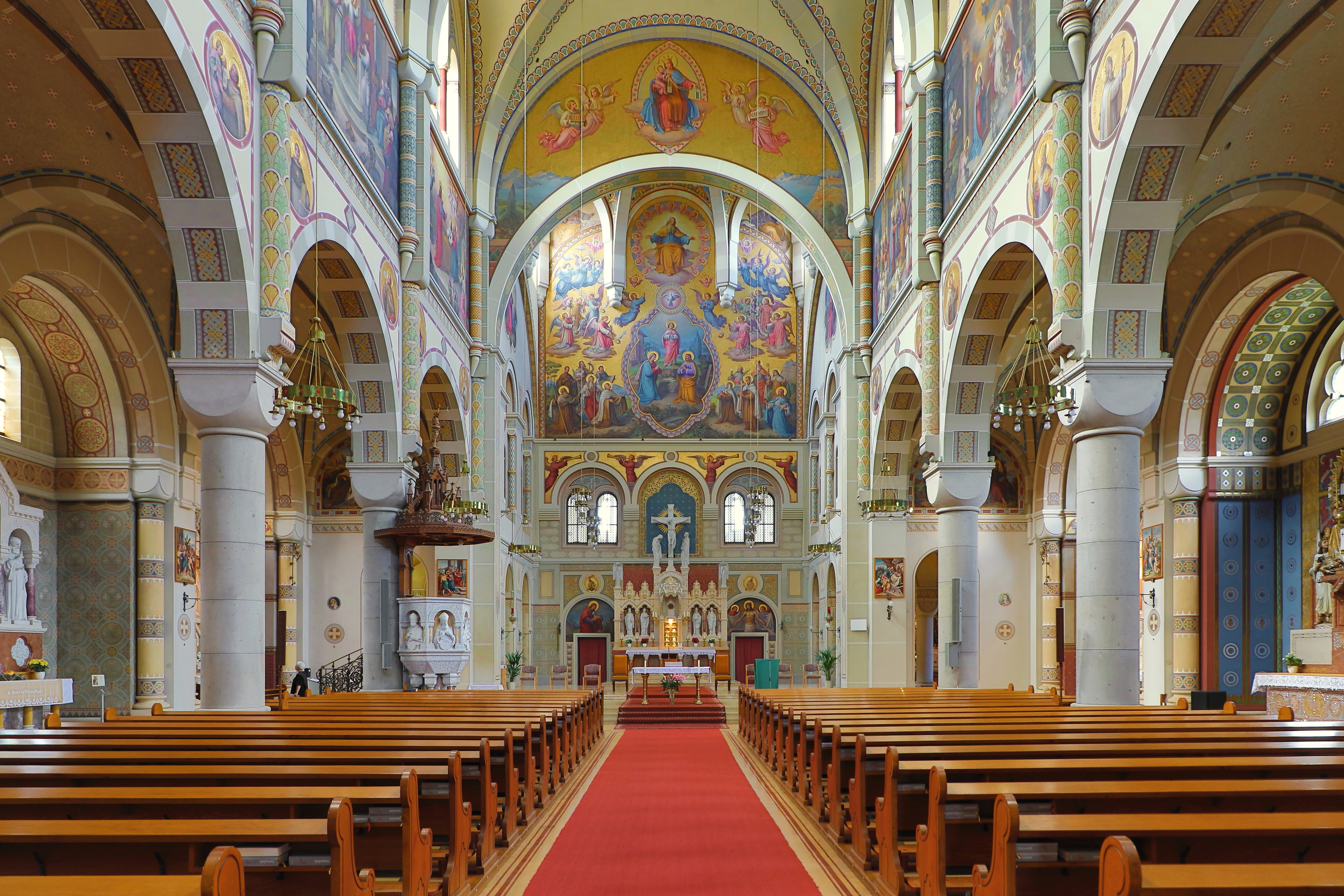
Interior view towards the high altar

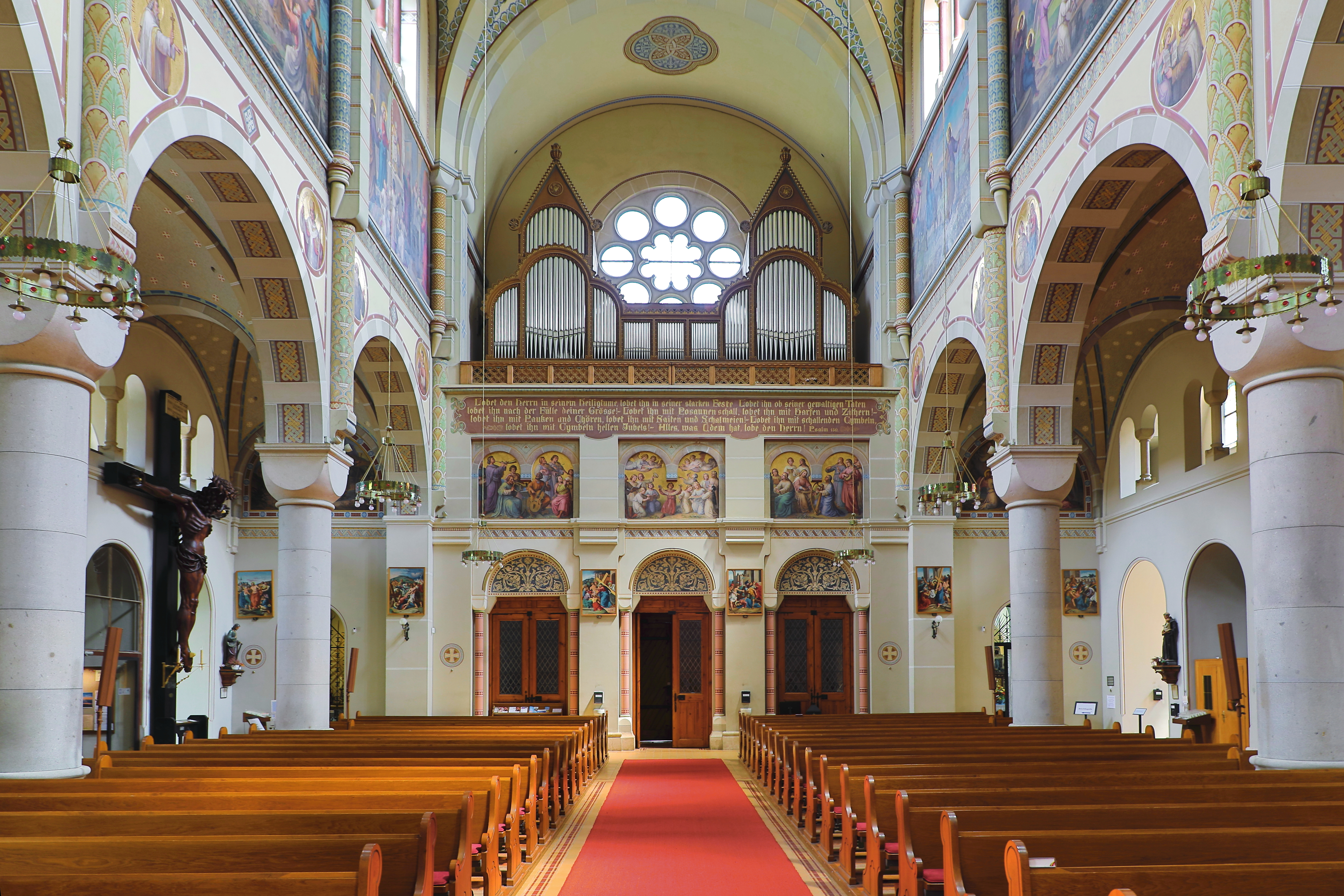
Interior view towards the organ gallery

A large mural depicting angels, saints and the Holy Family decorates the wall above the main altar. It is the work of Josef Kastner, who also decorated the nave with scenes from the life of the Holy Family. The altar is the work of Ludwig Schadler and also depicts the four Doctors of the Eastern Church (John Chrysostom, Basil the Great, Gregory of Nazianzus, and Athanasius of Alexandria) in the foreground and Jesus on the cross, flanked by his mother Mary and John the Apostle in the background.

== The secondary altars ==
The church has six side altars, which are described here in clockwise order from the front left-hand corner of the church.

=== The altar of mercy ===
The most important side altar is called the altar of mercy, Mary with bowed head. The altar was made in 1904 by the Marmorindustrie Kiefer AG company from Oberalm using Untersberg marble in accordance with a design by Richard Jordan. The depiction of Mary is to be found on a niche altar reminiscent of Romanesque designs. It is flanked by two angels shown in relief and bears the inscription Ave Maria, gratia plena. The history of the depiction itself is explained on an arch over the altar.

The depiction of Mary is an oil painting 45 x 60 cm in size. It is the work of an unknown master of the Italian school of the 15th or 16th century. It shows Mary with her head slightly bowed. A crown was added in 1931. According to legend, the depiction was found by Pater Dominicus covered in dust in an old building near the first Carmelite monastery in the Roman neighborhood of Trastevere. It was restored and made its way to the court in Munich, before being moved to Vienna. It was revered by female Carmelites belonging to the Ordo Carmelitarum, and Ferdinand II is supposed to have prayed before it during the Battle of White Mountain in 1620. Ferdinand II later ascribed the Catholic army's victory to Mary's help. During World War I, the picture was carried in great processions through the streets of Vienna to St. Stephen's Cathedral, where thousands prayed before it for peace. Even Franz Joseph I believed Mary's help could be achieved via this picture and had it brought to Schönbrunn Palace so that he too could pray for peace before it.

=== The altar of the child Jesus ===
Opposite the altar of mercy is the altar of the child Jesus. It too was made using Untersberg marble in 1904. Above the altar, there is a copy of a wooden figure of the child Jesus from the 18th century which the Carmelites had brought from their hermitage in Mannersdorf. For its part, the original figure was based on the famous Jesulein (the little Jesus) wax figure in Prague.

=== The altar of Christ the King ===
The altar of Christ the King stands to the right of the altar of the child Jesus. It was made in 1922 by the architect of the church, Richard Jordan, from maiolica and marble in art deco style. The altar's design demonstrates the dramatic change in style that had taken place in the space of 20 years.

=== The altar of Saint Teresa ===
To the right of the altar of Christ the King is the altar of Saint Teresa. It was donated by the family of Unterdöbling industrialist Johann Zacherl and shows the Transfiguration of Christ on Mount Tabor. The altar was made by the same artists who participated in the construction of the altar to Saint John.

=== The altar of Saint John ===
Opposite the altar of Saint Teresa is the altar of Saint John. Like the altar of Saint Teresa, it was donated by the Zacherl family, and shows a vision that Saint John of the Cross had. It was created between 1913 and 1914 by the Dutch Benedictine Jan Verkade. Verkade was also responsible for the glass window above the altar. The marble altar table with its cross and candlesticks is the work of Slovenian architect Jože Plečnik.

=== The altar of Saint Joseph ===
The altar of Saint Joseph is located between the altar to Saint John and the altar of mercy.

== The chapel of Saint Teresa ==
The chapel of Saint Teresa houses the grave of the Spanish Carmelite priest Dominicus a Jesu Maria, who participated in the foundation of the monastery in Leopoldstadt in 1632. He was also responsible for bringing the depiction of Mary featured on the altar of mercy to Vienna. In 1903, Dominicus’ remains were brought from Leopoldstadt to Döbling. Behind his grave stands a white marble altar with a figure of Thérèse of Lisieux, a Carmelite nun who was canonised in 1925.

The Carmelite crypt, which is accessible from the chapel, was used between 1917 and 1932 to house coffins, including that of Charles X of France, brought to Vienna on Empress Zita’s orders from the Kostanjevica Monastery in Gorizia which the Empress feared would be damaged in the course of World War I.
