= Zacherlfabrik =

Coordinates: 48°14′38″N 16°21′5″E

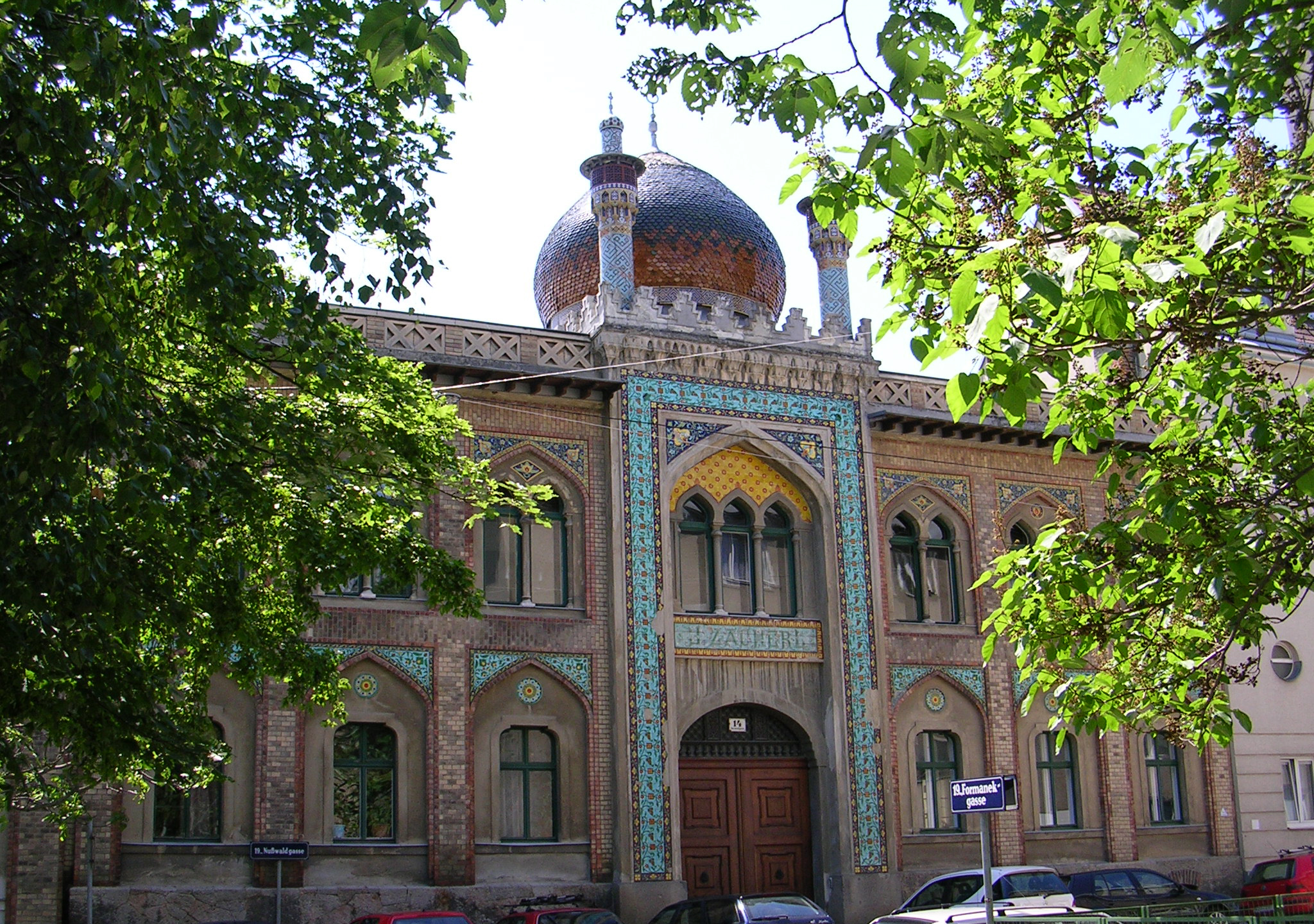
The Zacherlfabrik

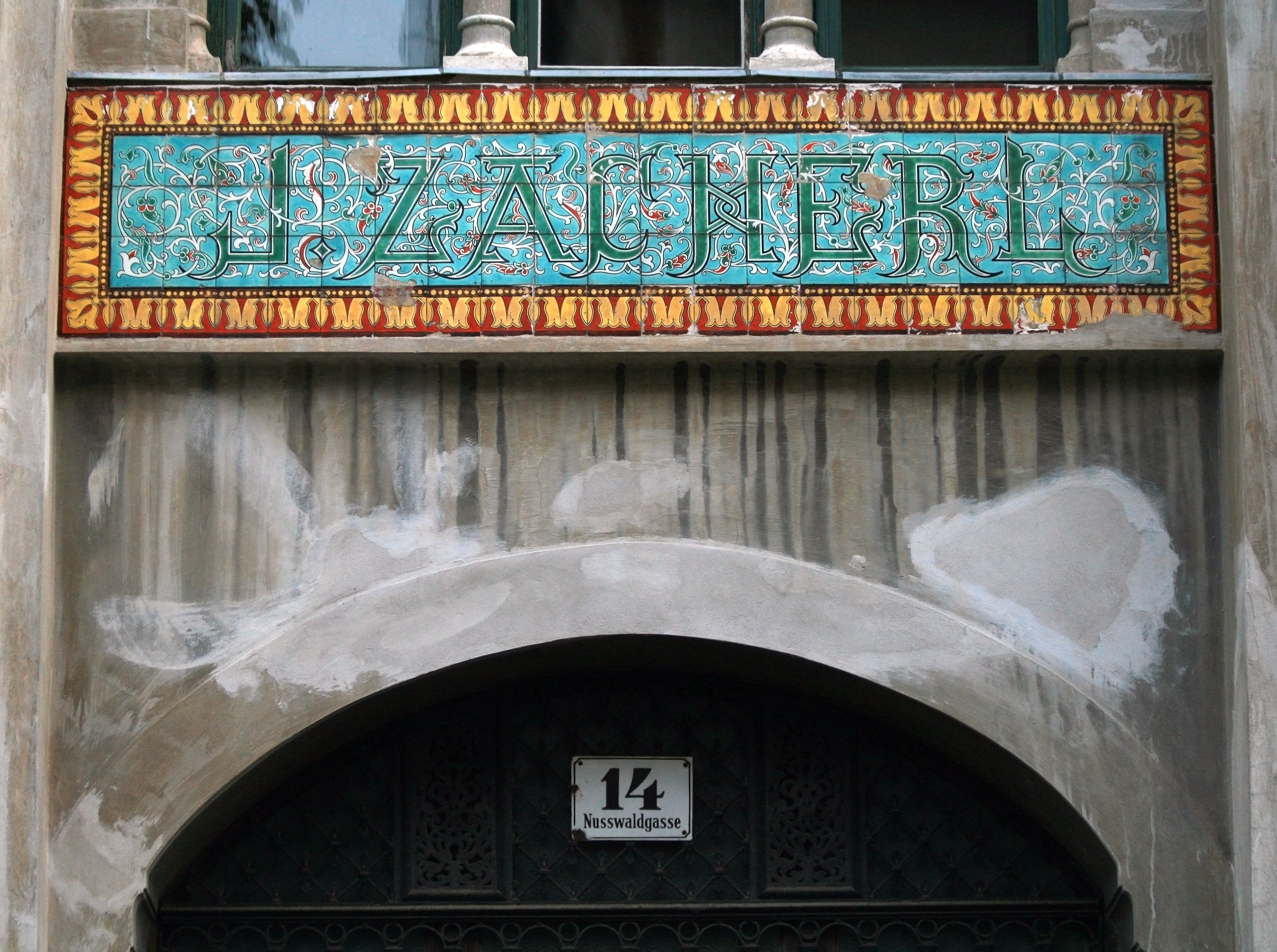
Lettering J. Zacherl on the portal

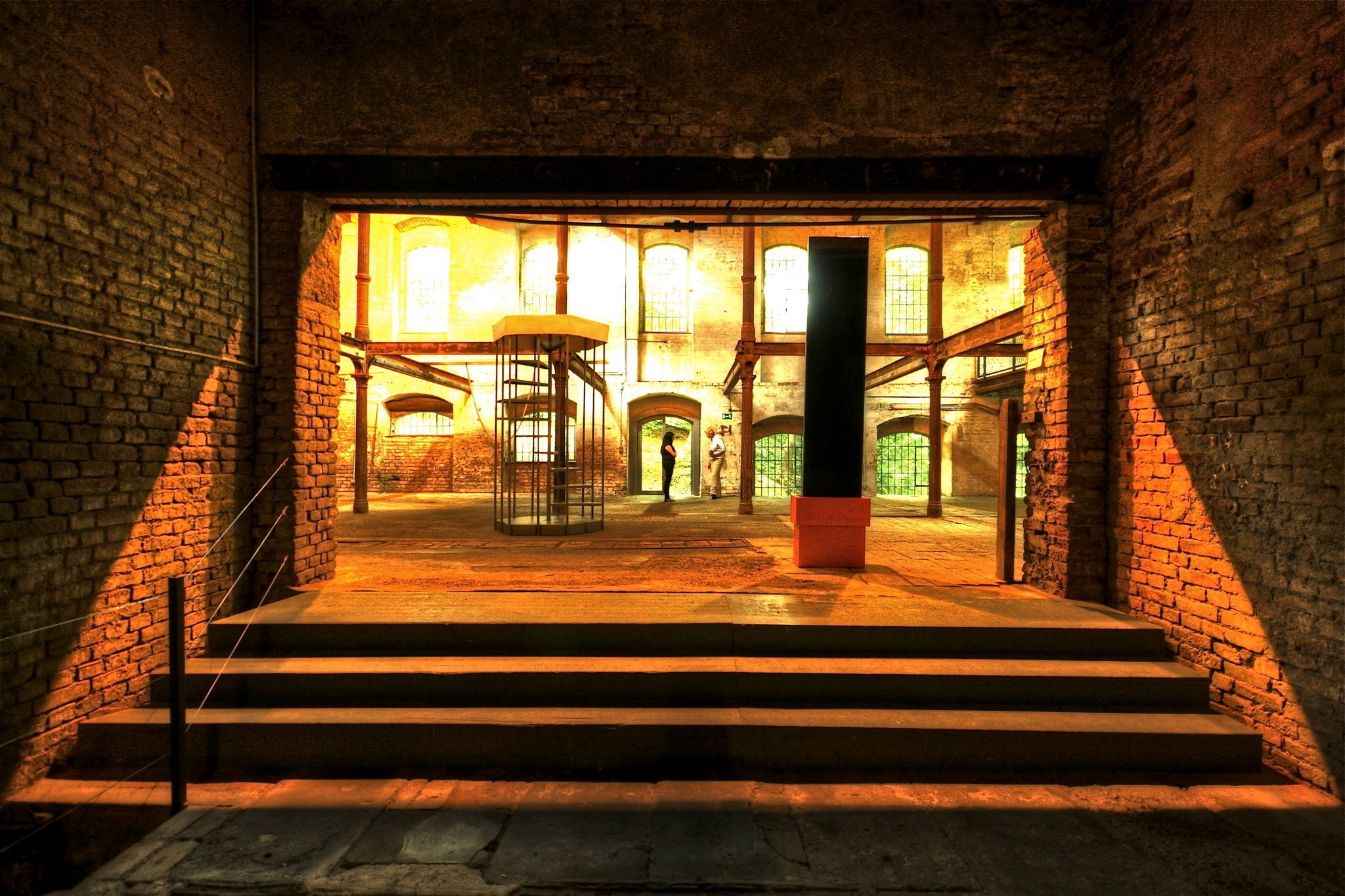
Exhibition in the Zacherlfabrik

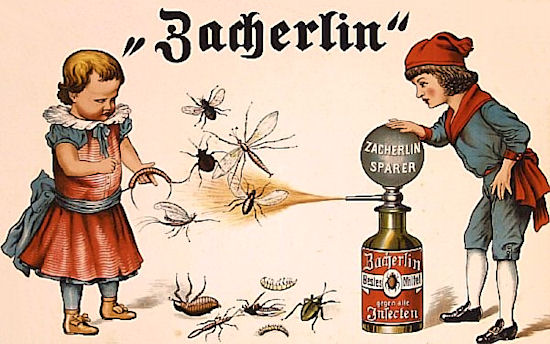
An advertisement for Zacherlin from 1907

The Zacherl factory (Zacherlfabrik) is a former factory in the 19th district of Vienna, Döbling. It was built in an oriental style.

== History ==
Johann Zacherl began importing insecticide made from pyrethrum from Tiflis in 1842. In 1870, he started to produce moth powder in Unterdöbling, which he sold under the name Zacherl’s insect-killing tincture (Zacherlin). By 1873, the four employees in his factory were already producing 600 tonnes of Zacherlin per year, which were sold in Zacherl's shops in Paris, Istanbul, Amsterdam, London, New York and Philadelphia.

In 1880, Zacherl left the company to his son, Johann Evangelist Zacherl. The factory in Unterdöbling was rebuilt between 1888 and 1892 to produce insecticide. The street-facing administrative wing of the building, which was designed by Karl Mayreder, is a rare example of commercially motivated Orientalism in European architecture. The Yenidze cigarette factory in Dresden is another example of this trend.

The ceramic tiles that were used in the facade and on the roof of the Zacherl factory were produced by the Wienerberger AG.

Johann Evangelist Zacherl expanded the Zacherl company's activities from the production of insecticide to include the cleaning, repair and storage of fur and rugs. Between 1903 and 1905, he built the Zacherlhaus at the Wildpretmarkt.

Following World War I, sales of insecticide were stunted by expensive import taxes and the growth of chemical industries. After Johann Evangelist Zacherl's death in 1936, his son Gregor Zacherl took control of the family factory, which from 1933 also produced ski bindings, but in 1949 Gregor Zacherl surrendered his merchant's licence. He died in 1954 and the name Zacherl was removed from the register of companies in 1958.

The factory building and its gardens stood empty for several decades, until in 2006 Veronika and Peter Zacherl, in cooperation with the Jesuit art fund, opened the former factory up for artistic projects. Since then, exhibitions and music soirees have been held in the building every summer.

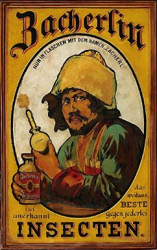
Zacherlin-advertising (1900)

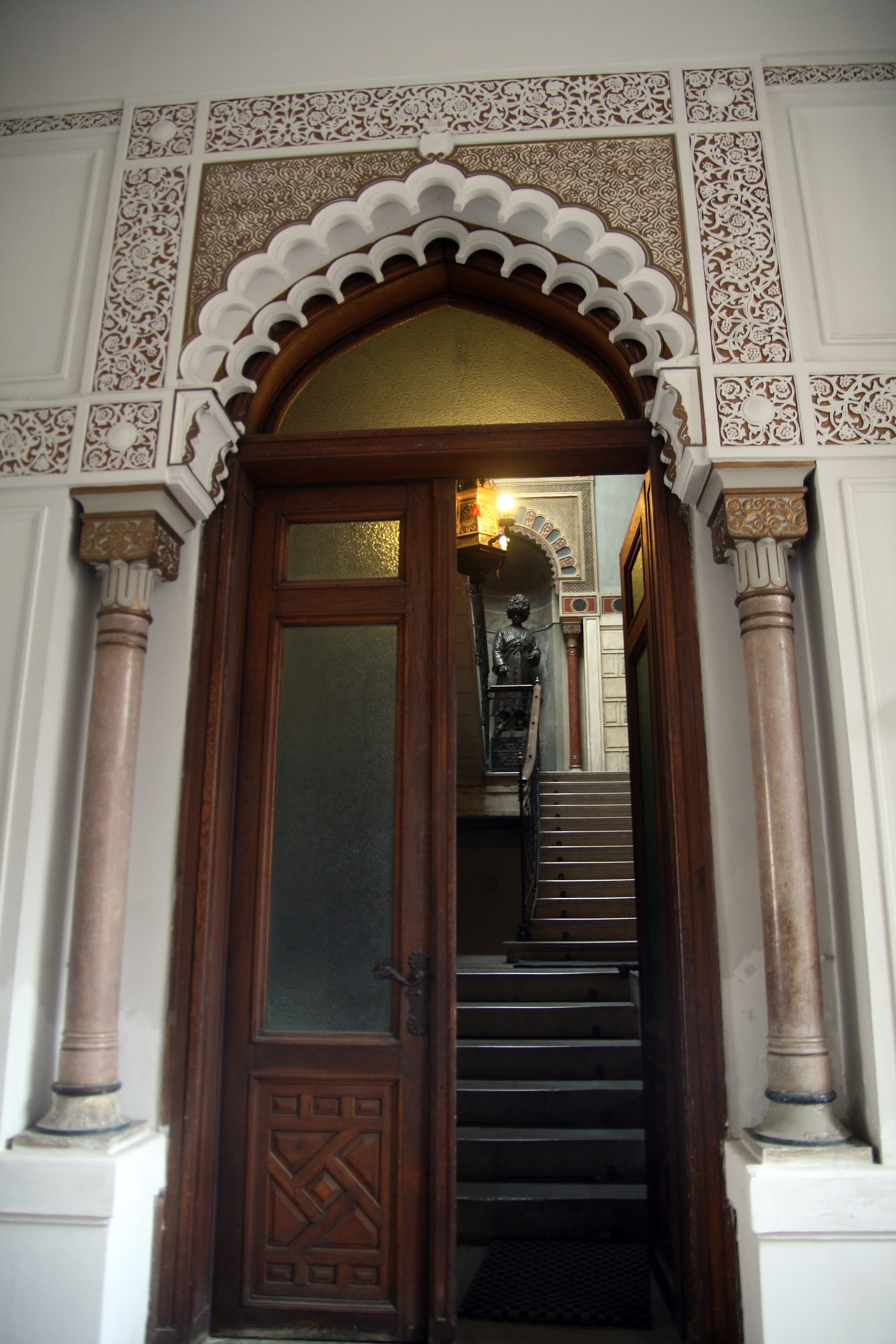
Internal door

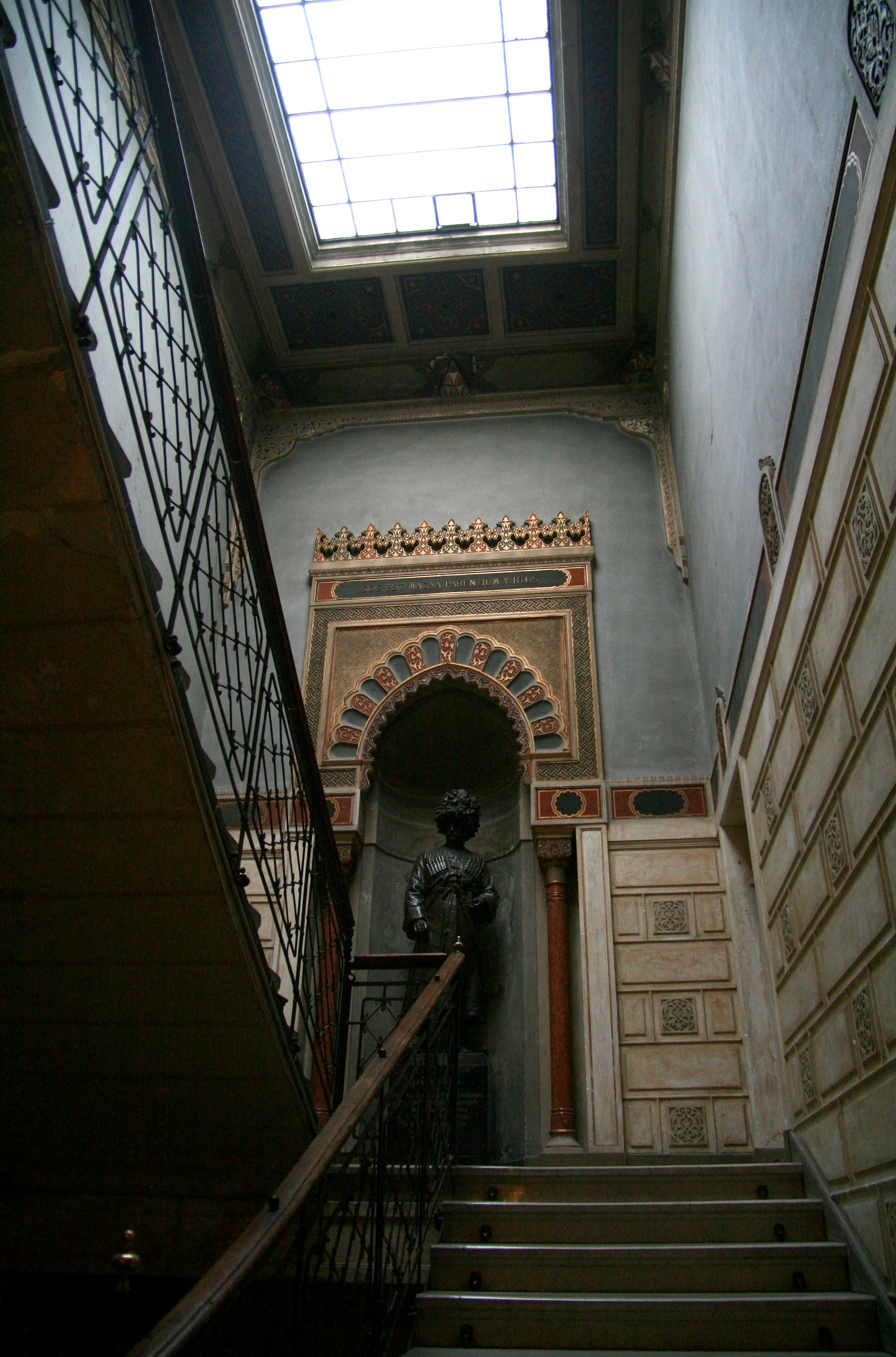
Staircase with statue of Johann Zacherl

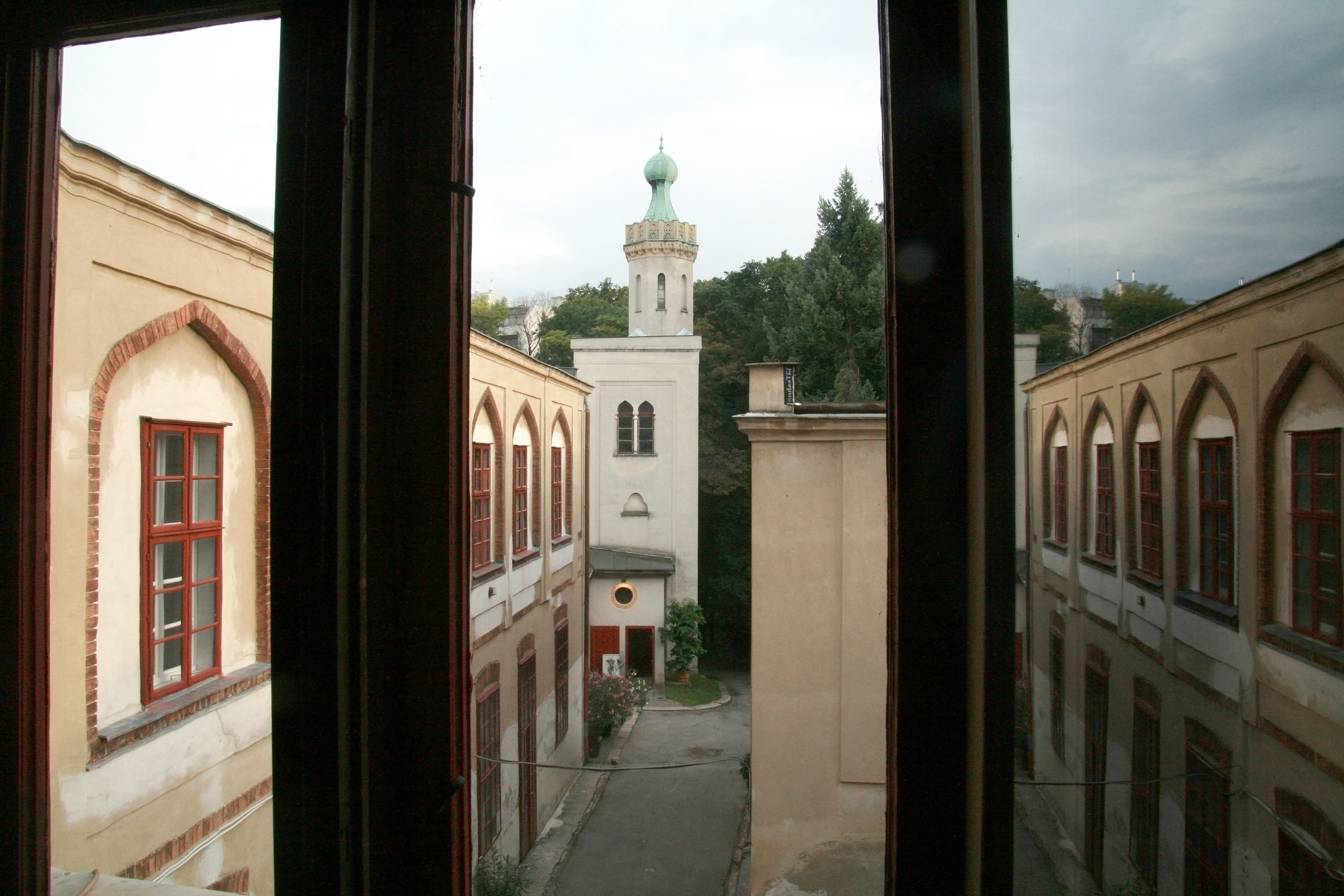
View of the factory area
