= Zacherlhaus =

Building in Vienna, Austria

Coordinates: 48°12′36″N 16°22′18″E

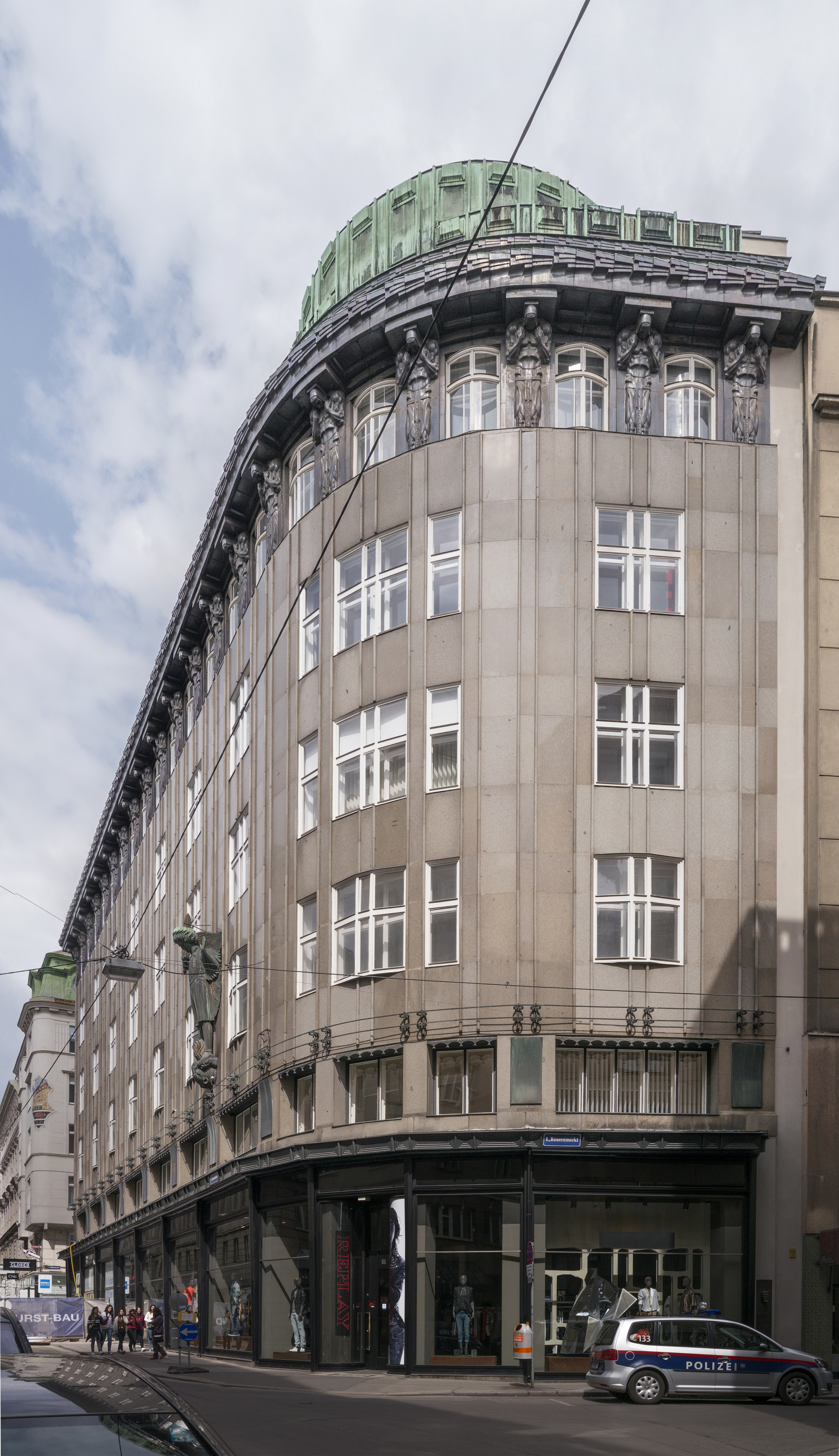
The Zacherlhaus in the centre of Vienna

The Zacherlhaus is a residential and business building designed by Jože Plečnik and built between 1903 and 1905 in the 1st district of Vienna, the central district of Innere Stadt (at Brandstätte 6 / Wildpretmarkt 2–4 / Bauernmarkt 2).

The construction was commissioned by Johann Evangelist Zacherl, son of the industrial magnate Johann Zacherl, who built the Zacherlfabrik. It was one of the first modern buildings erected at the Wildpretmarkt in Vienna's city centre. The façade is made of polished grey granite plates; the artistically executed cornice is also noteworthy. The figure of Archangel Michael on the façade is the work of Ferdinand Andri, while the atlantes were designed by Franz Metzner. The oval-shaped stairwell features a lamp that resembles an insect; this is a reference to insecticide, the production of which had made the Zacherl family rich.

In 1949, it was necessary to restore the Zacherlhaus after it had been damaged during World War II.

Today, the Zacherlhaus is a listed building. It is one of the most important examples of the work of the Otto Wagner-school. It belongs to Johann Zacherl's descendants and is used as office space.

== Gallery ==
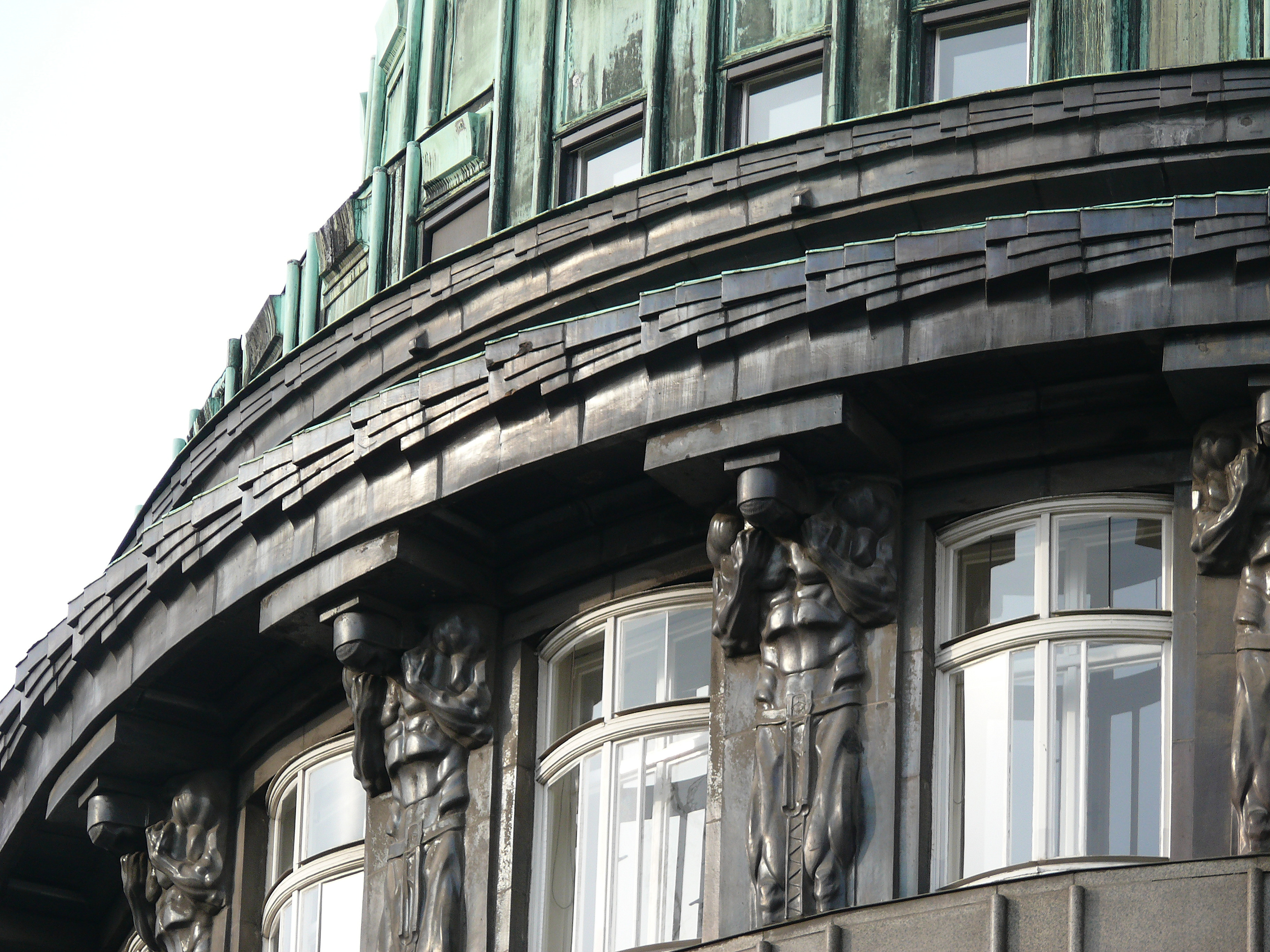
eaves with atlantes

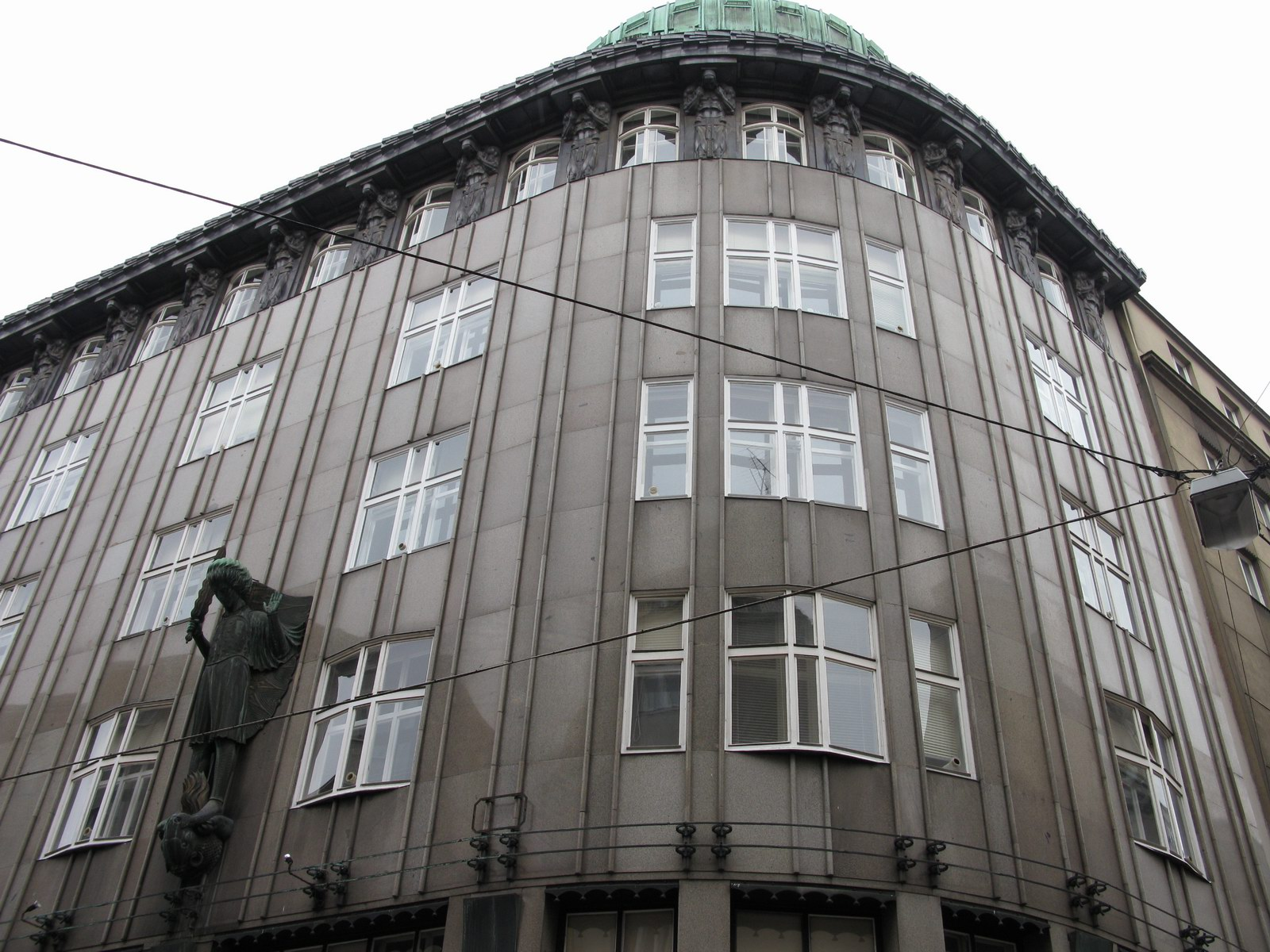
facade

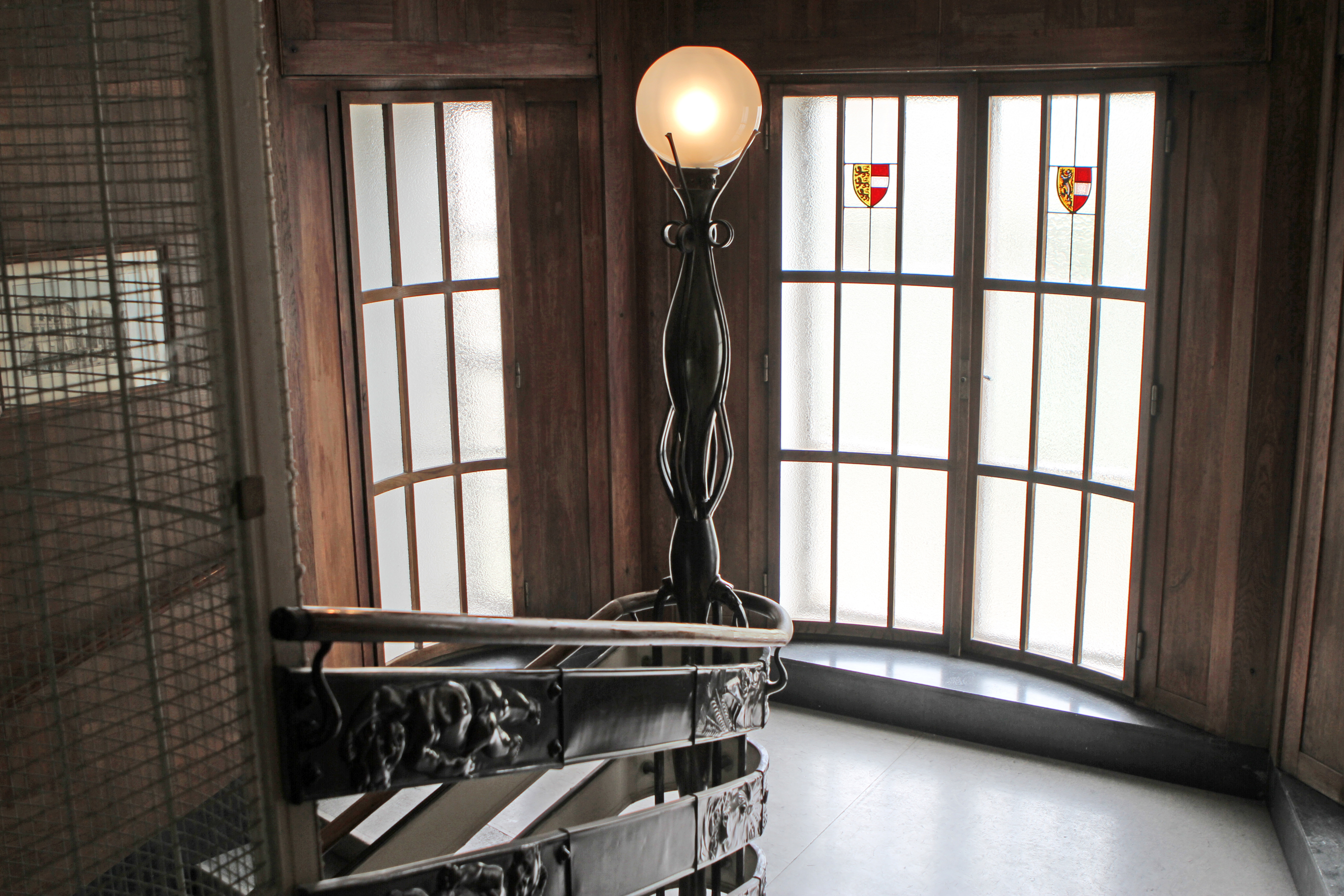
stairwell

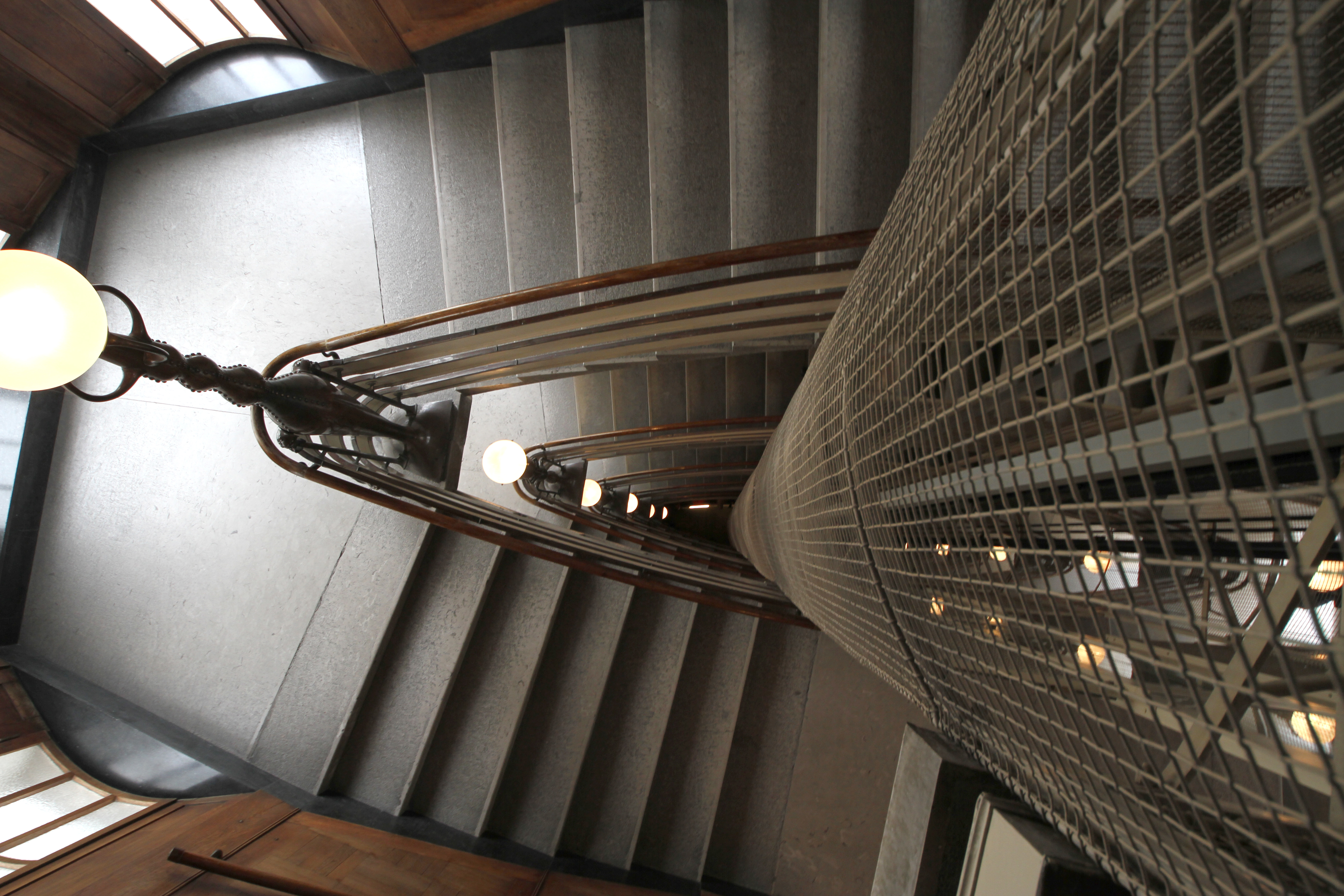
stairwell

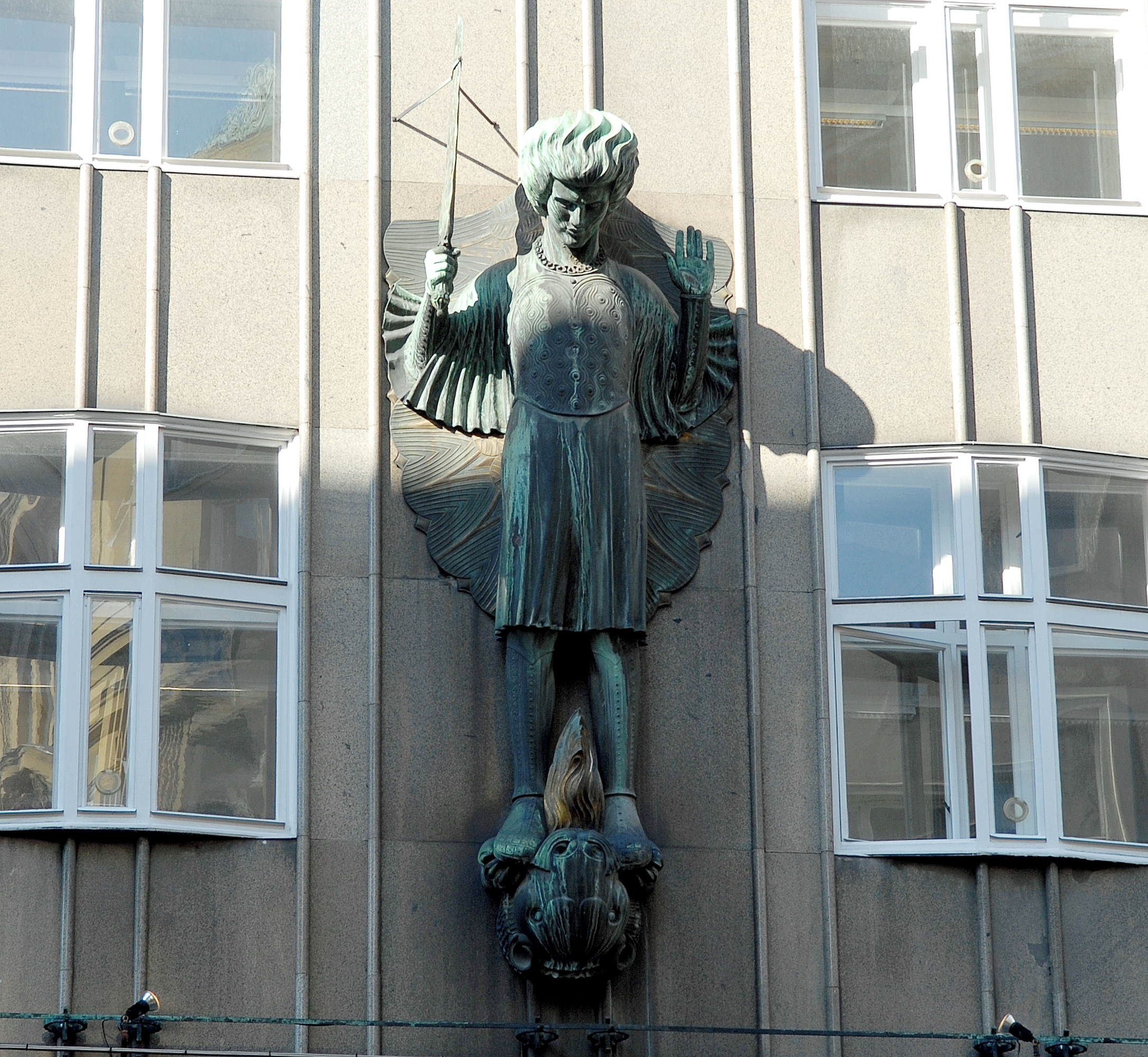
Ferdinand Andri: sculpture Archangel Michael on the facade
