= Unterdöbling =

Unterdöbling (Central Bavarian: Untadöbling) was an independent municipality until 1892 and is today a part of Döbling, the 19th district of Vienna. It is also one of the 89 Katastralgemeinden.

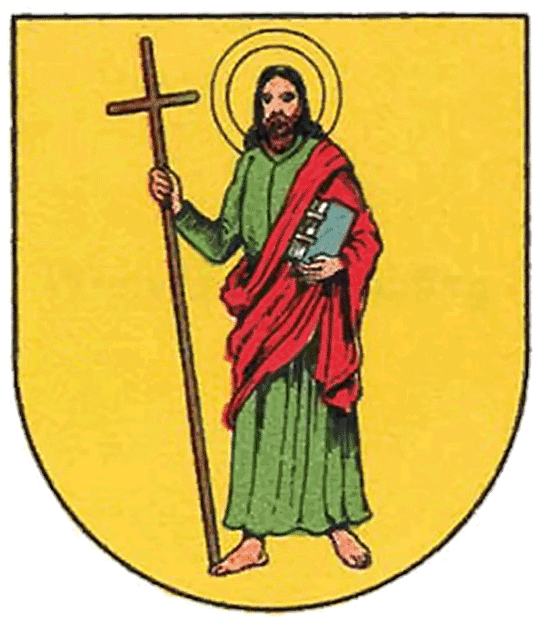
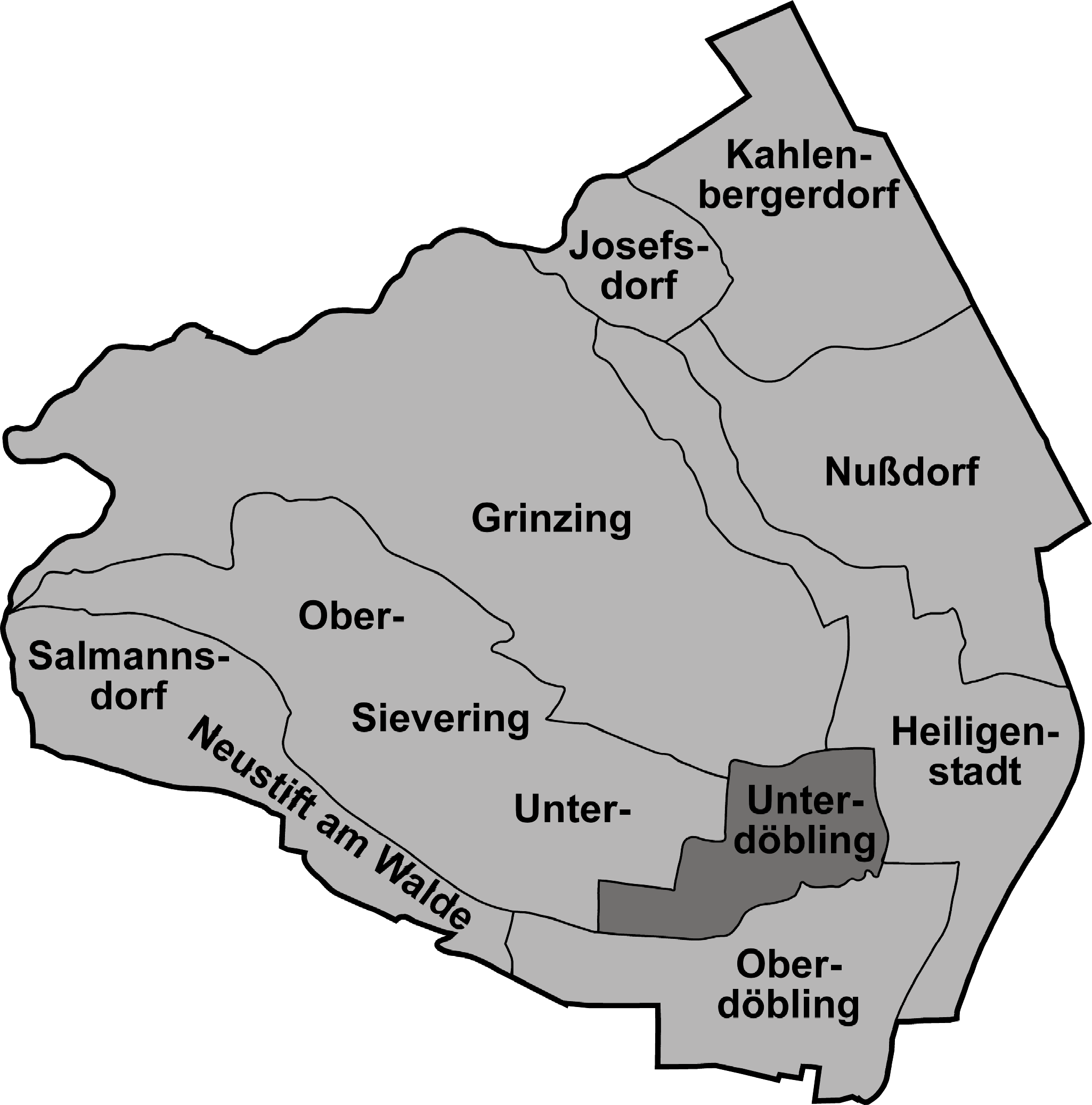
Unterdöbling
| Coat of arms | Map |
|---|---|
| AUT Unterdöbling COA |
Location: 48°14′39″N 16°21′5″E

== Geography ==
The Katastralgemeinde Unterdöbling lies in Döbling, the 19th district of Vienna, to the north of Oberdöbling. The border between Unterdöbling and Oberdöbling is largely determined by the Krottenbach, a stream which today serves as a canal. The medieval town centre lay in a dip by the stream, where nowadays the Rudolfinergasse and the Nußwaldgasse (which used to be called the Herrengasse) lie. In more recent times, settlement took place on the plateau that rises slowly to the west and to the north towards the Kahlenberg. Unterdöbling’s southern border runs alongside Oberdöbling, in the west it borders on Untersievering and in the north on Grinzing as well as on parts of Heiligenstadt. The eastern border is marked by a road leading from Oberdöbling via the Hohe Warte to Heiligenstadt.

== History ==
=== The origin of the name Döbling ===
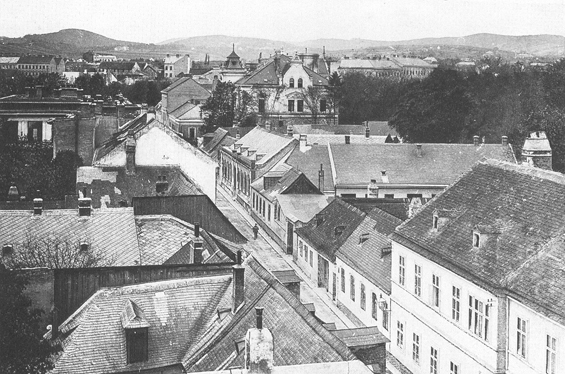
The Rudolfinergasse in 1910

Döbling is mentioned for the first time in an official document in 114 as de Teopilic. This name is of Slavic origin; toplica either means “marshy water” and refers to the settlement’s location by the Krottenbach or derives from the Old Slavic term for a “warm creek”. Later usage includes spellings such as Toblich, Töbling and Tepling.

Originally, Unterdöbling was known as Chrottendorf because of its location by the Krottenbach. The name Unterdöbling was first used in the 15th century.

=== Unterdöbling from the Middle Ages to the 16th century ===
Medieval Unterdöbling was inhabited by farmers who were largely reliant on their own produce. They produced wine for sale, but also planted cereals for this purpose and produced fruit, vegetables and milk products. In the 12th century, the nobles derer von Topolic owned Döbling, later it was the property of the Dominican monastery in Tulln. It is mentioned in a document from 1310 as the village of the ladies of Tulln. As time progressed, separate villages evolved, divided from one another by the Krottenbach. The separation of the two settlements was recorded in an official document for the first time in 1591.

=== Unterdöbling since the 16th century ===
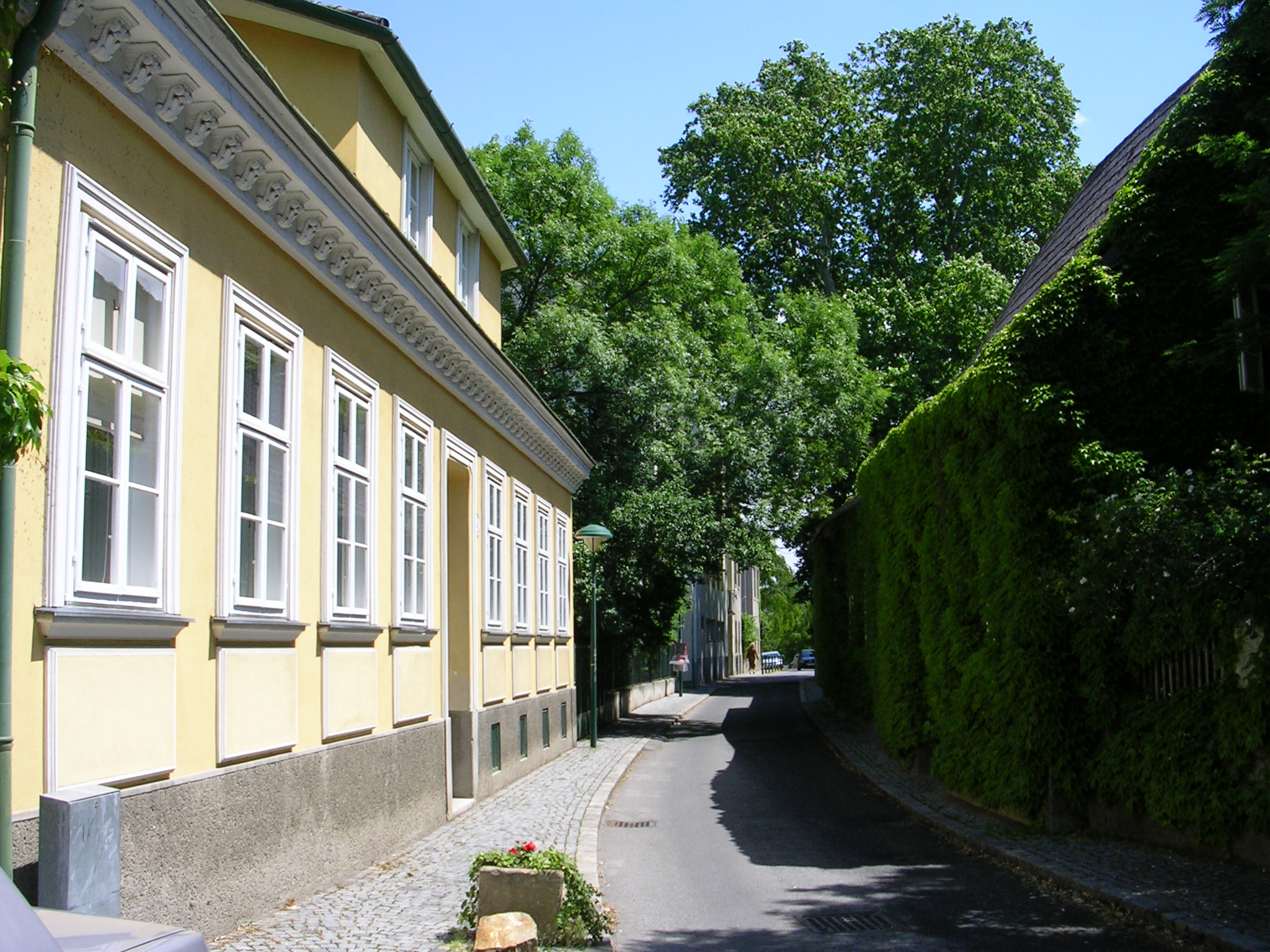
The Nußwaldgasse

A village seal dating from 1688 has been preserved. It depicts Saint James with the inscription Sigil der gemain Under Thöbling 1688 ("Seal of the municipality Under Thöbling 1688"). Unterdöbling’s development was impeded by a lack of available land and remained behind that of Oberdöbling. By the start of the 18th century, Unterdöbling was nonetheless still around a third larger than Oberdöbling, but the plague hit Unterdöbling much harder than its southern neighbour in 1713. More than half of all houses were infected and 52 people died. Nearby Sievering was however hit even harder. In 1783, there were 300 inhabitants in Unterdöbling, and around 1800, Unterdöbling still had just one street. By 1828, the number of inhabitants had risen to around 500 and the number of houses to 53, but the population shrank again in the following years. In 1835, there were just 400 inhabitants left. Thereafter though, growth paralleled that in Oberdöbling. In 1853, 941 people were living in Unterdöbling; in 1890 there were 2,074 people in 170 houses. In 1892, Unterdöbling and Oberdöbling, along with the surrounding suburbs of Grinzing, the Kahlenbergerdorf, Nußdorf, Heiligenstadt, Sievering and Josefsdorf, were turned into the 19th district of Vienna, Döbling.

In the post-war years of the 1950s, the Krim, a part of Unterdöbling, experienced rapid growth. This once infamous and poverty-stricken quarter was turned into an upmarket residential area with its own parish church.

== Economy ==
Viticulture still had a prominent place in Unterdöbling's economy in 1826. Almost half of the available land was covered with vineyards. Agriculture occupied a further quarter of the land and pasture made up around one fifth.

The Zacherl insecticide factory in the Nußwaldgasse developed into Unterdöbling's most important industrial enterprise. Johann Zacherl had been importing insecticide made of pyrethrum from Tiflis since 1842, and in 1870, he began production in Unterdöbling. His Zacherlin product was sold in his own shops all over the world. Karl Mayreder’s reconstruction of the factory in the form of a mosque gave Unterdöbling the most unusual factory building in all of Vienna. Zacherl’s heirs struggled with the growth of the chemical industry after World War I; in 1933, they were also producing ski bindings. The Zacherl factory closed in the 1950s.

== Sights ==
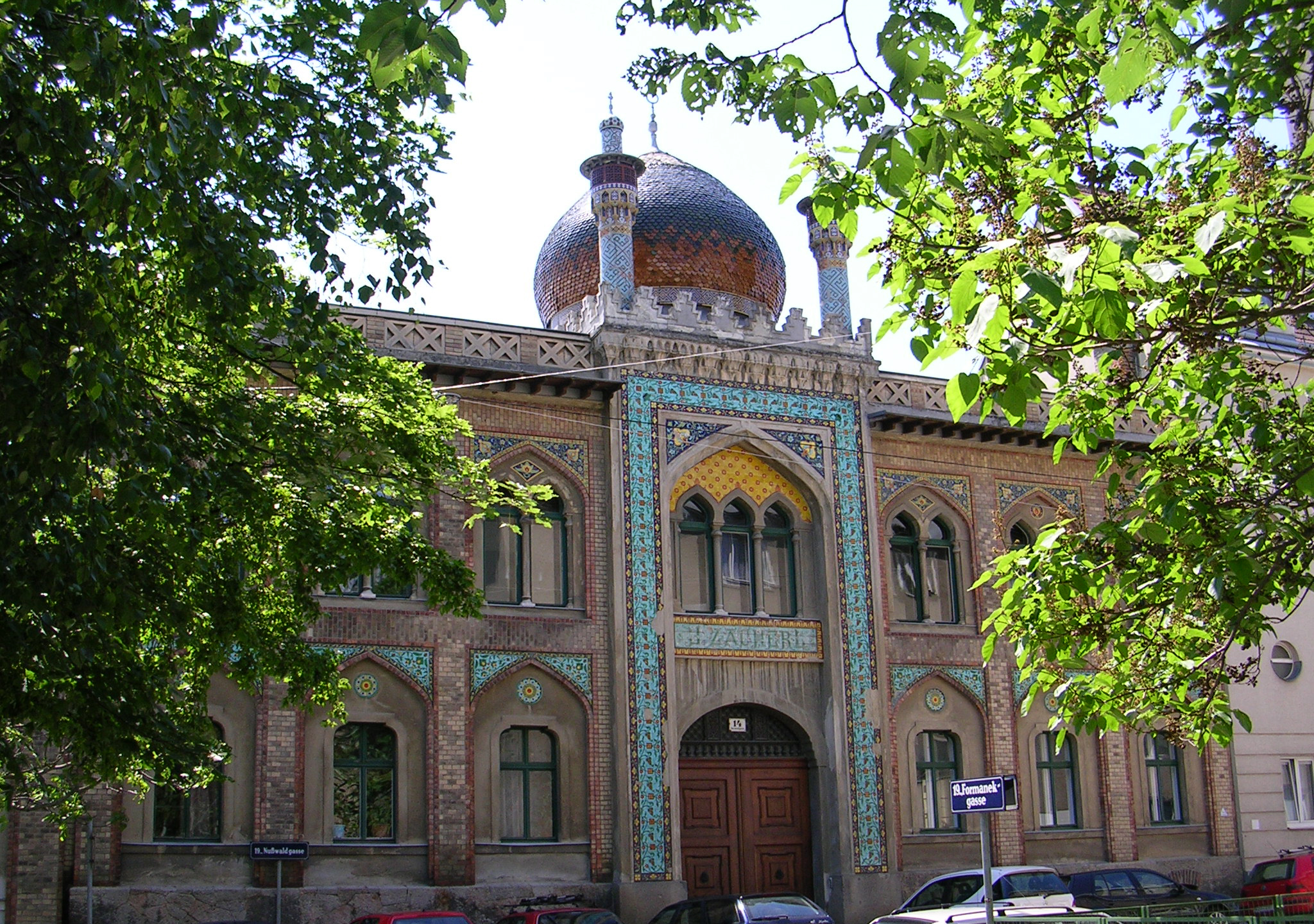
The Zacherl factory

Johann Zacherl’s Zacherlfabrik, designed in an oriental style and resembling a mosque, is a unique construction. Another important building is the Döbling Carmelite Nunnery in the Silbergasse and its Kirche Hl. Familie (Holy Family Church). There are also several former vintner’s houses in Unterdöbling. The local cemetery, which held the graves of Johann Strauß the Elder und Joseph Lanner, was also in Unterdöbling, but it was closed in 1927. Although their remains were moved to Vienna’s Zentralfriedhof, their graves became a feature of the Strauß-Lanner-Park, which was established on the site of the former cemetery.
