= Johann Zacherl =

Austrian inventor, industrialist, and manufacturer (1814–1888)

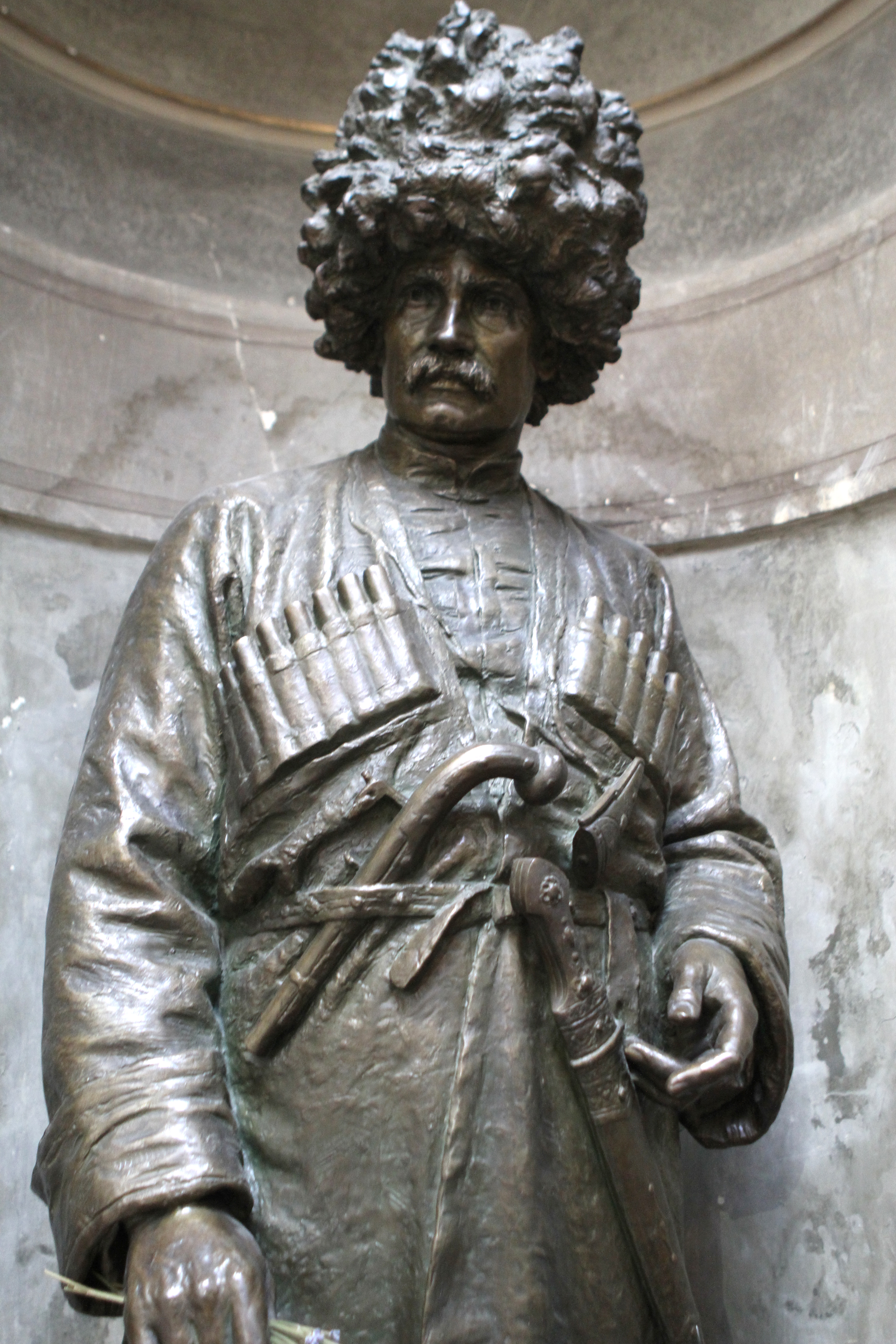
- Born: 1814; Munich, Kingdom of Bavaria
- Died: 30 June 1888; Vienna, Austria-Hungary
- Occupations: inventor, businessman
- Known for: Zacherlin (insecticide)

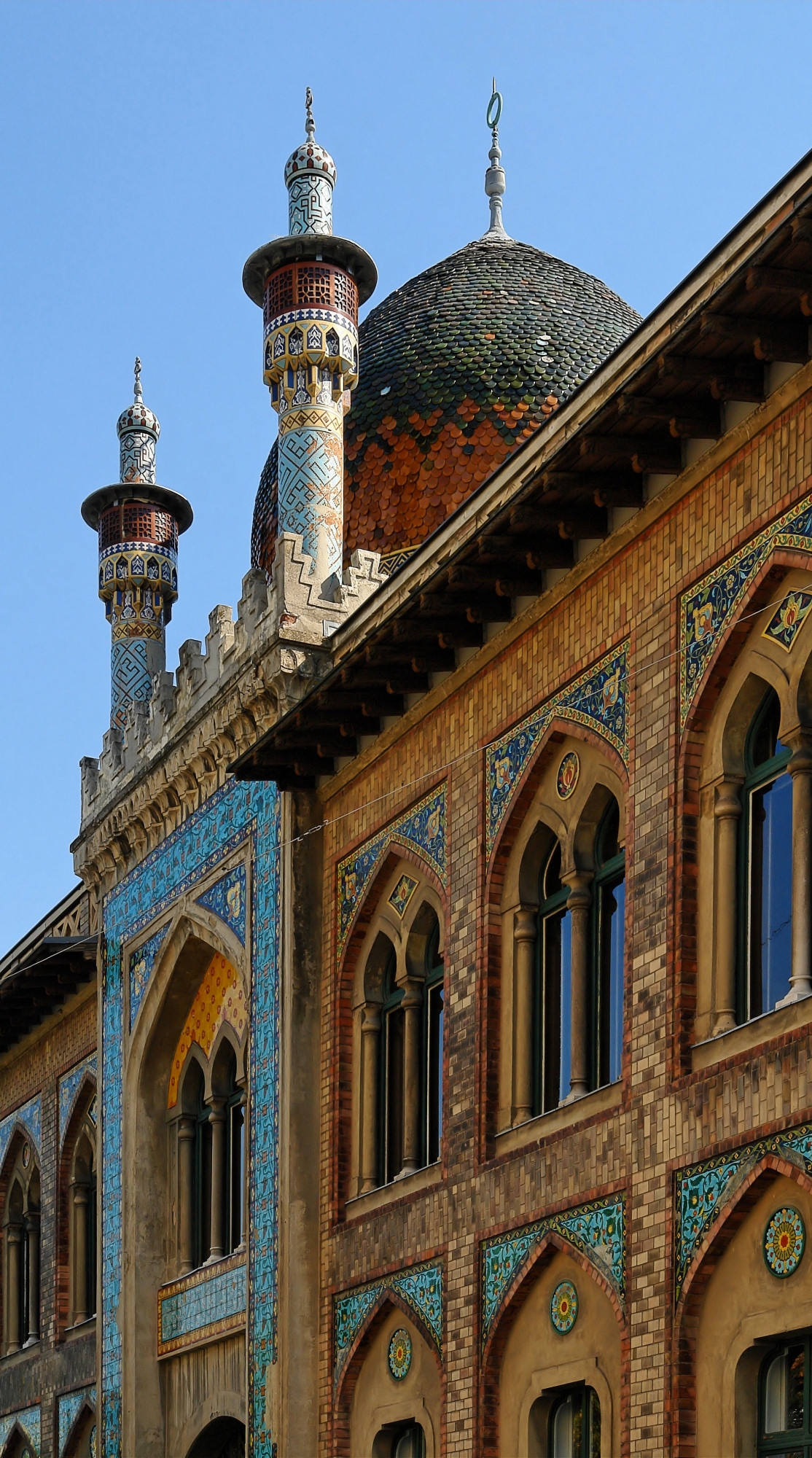
Zacherl insecticide factory (Vienna, Austria) by Hugo von Wiedenfeld. 48°14′38.3″N 16°21′3.9″E

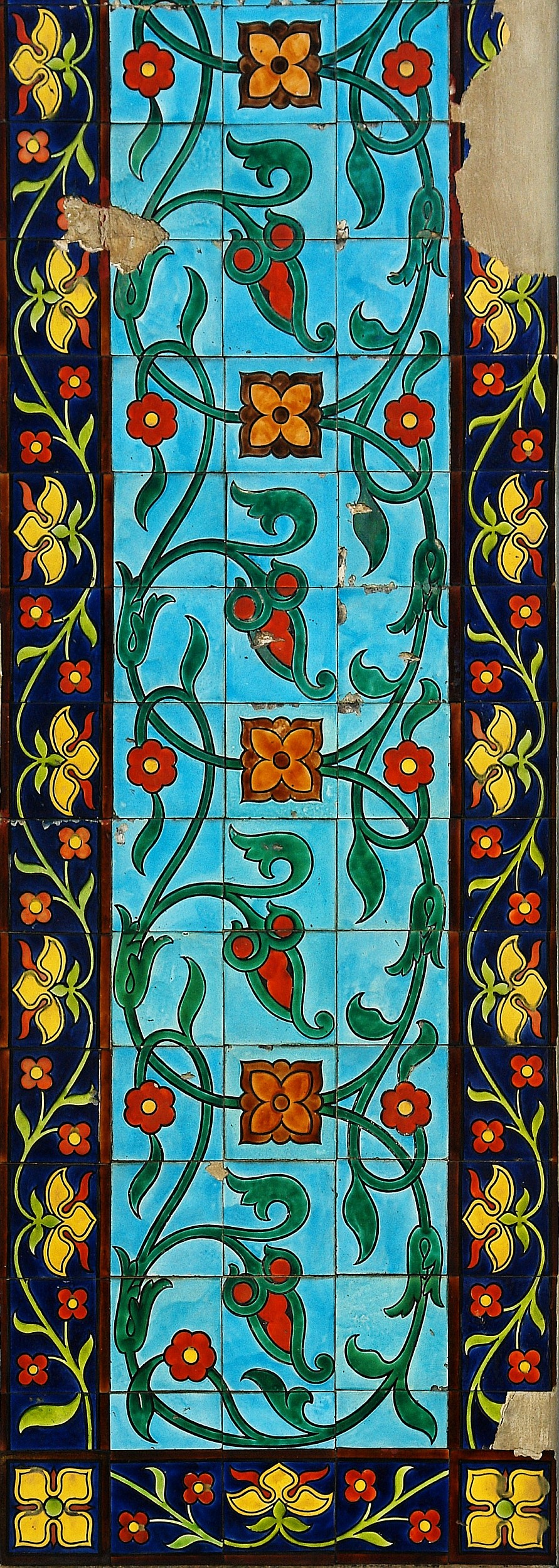
Ceramic covering the facade of the Zacher insecticide factory

Johann Zacherl (1814 – 30 June 1888) was an Austrian inventor, industrialist and manufacturer who made a fortune in the late 19th century selling dried flower heads of Chrysanthemum cinerariifolium as an insecticide.

== Biography ==
Zacherl was born in Munich (Germany) in 1814. After finishing his studies, he left Munich to visit Vienna, St Petersburg and Odessa. He eventually reached Tiflis in the Caucasus, where he discovered villagers used a natural insecticide, Pyrethrum, against vermin. He began to develop the powder's trade with Austria in 1842. The powder received different names: Lowizachek (in Armenia), Bug Flower, Powder of Persia and Persian insect powder.

After a longer stay in Tiflis, in 1855 he established his company, Mottenfraß-Versicherungsunternehmung Johann Zacherl, in Vienna's 19th district, and began selling the insect repellent Zacherlin. With the help of his son, Johann Evangelist, he developed the Pyrethrum product line.

Zacherl died in Vienna, Austria in 1888.

== Zacherlin insecticide ==
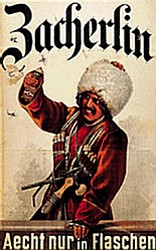
Advertising campaign (1900)

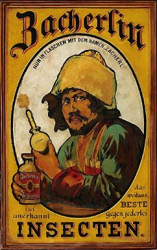
Advertising campaign (1910)

Zacherl developed an effective, all-natural moth insecticide made from Pyrethrum blossoms. He agreed with the chiefs of the villages to collect the flowers and ship them to Tiflis. He then ground the dried blossoms into powder, filled bags with it, and put them in sheep leathers for transport to Europe. He continued importing dried heads of Chrysanthemum Cinerariifolum and Chrysanthemum Coccineum directly from Tifflis until 1870, when he began producing it locally. His insecticide powder was called Zacherlin. He developed other products, including a carpet-cleaning machine "distributing over the cleansed carpet the insecticide to guard it against the attack of moth" in 1882, a Pyrethrum Soap, and a tincture for destroying insects.

According to Hiscox, the insecticide was obtained as follows:

The powder is obtained by brushing the dried flowers of the pellitory (pyrethrum). The leaves, too, are often used. (...) The active principle is not a volatile oil, as stated by some writers, but a rosin, which can be dissolved out from the dry flowers by means of ether. The leaves also contain this rosin but in. smaller proportions than the flowers. Tincture of pyrethrum is made by infusing the dried flowers in five times their weight of rectified spirit of wine. Diluted with water it is used as a lotion. (...) The dust resulting from the use of insect powder sometimes proves irritating to the mucous membranes of the one applying the powder. This is best avoided by the use of a spray atomizer.

Zacherlin's packaging showed a cossack with a high cap and an atomizer in hand, a marketing strategy that proved very successful.

== Architecture ==
The insecticide factory in Döbling was designed by the architect Hugo von Wiedenfeld and constructed by Karl Mayreder in 1888–1892. Explicitly oriental in style, the polychromed brick building with pointed arches, two minarets and a dome was one of Vienna's most recognized structures.

Since the collapse of the Zacherl company, the building has been used as a warehouse for carpets, furs and textiles. Today, it is used for art exhibitions and symposiums, in association with the contemporary art exhibitions Position:Gegenwart at Jesuit's Church of Vienna.

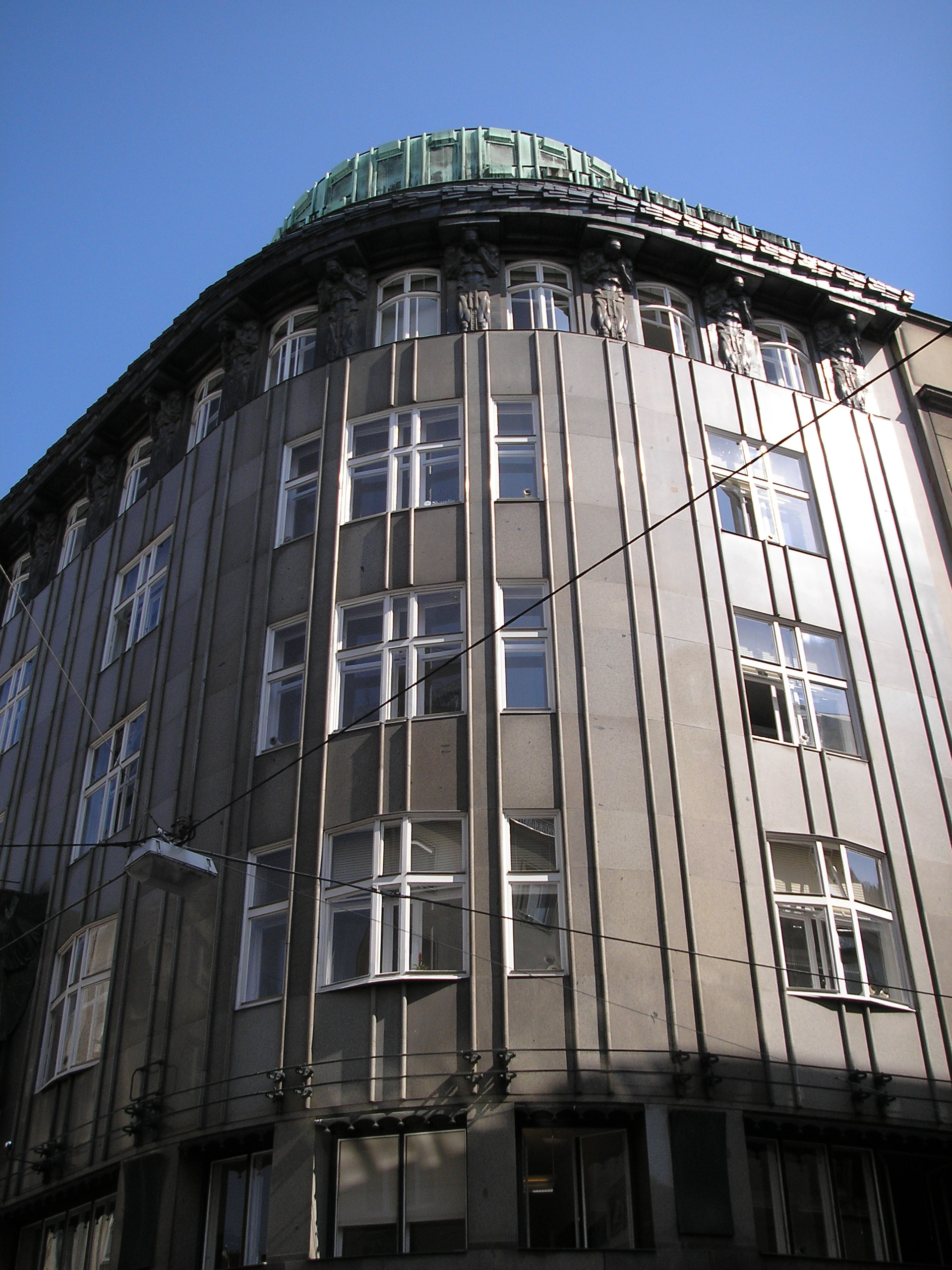
Zacherl-Haus, located at Brandstätte 6, 1010 Vienna constructed by Jože Plečnik. 48°12′34.9″N 16°22′17.2″E

Zacherl's son, Johann Evangelist Zacherl, commissioned Jože Plečnik to build the office building Zacherlhaus in Vienna's Innere Stadt from 1903 to 1905. It includes a row of atlantes along the cornice line by sculptor Franz Metzner.
