= Rosa Mayreder =

Austrian freethinker, author, painter, musician and feminist

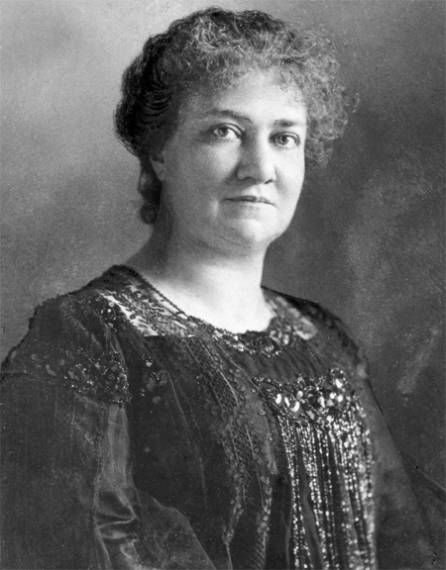
- Born: Rosa Obermeyer; 30 November 1858; Vienna
- Died: 19 January 1938 (aged 79); Vienna
- Spouse: Karl Mayreder

Rosa Mayreder (née Obermeyer; 30 November 1858 – 19 January 1938) was an Austrian freethinker, author, painter, musician and feminist. She was the daughter of Marie and Franz Arnold Obermayer, who was a wealthy restaurant operator and barkeeper.

Rosa had twelve brothers and sisters, and although her conservative father did not believe in the formal education of girls, he allowed her to participate in the Greek and Latin lessons of one of her brothers. She also received private instruction in French, painting and the piano.

== Life and marriage ==
Rosa Obermeyer was born on 30 November 1858. Her father was Franz Arnold Obermayer, who was the owner of a prosperous tavern. Accounts of Mayreder's family, social atmosphere, and insights into her personality are recorded in a series of diary entries, the first of which is dated 28 April 1873; she was fourteen at the time. Her autobiographical diary entries covered a range of topics from her everyday life to her feelings on war.

Growing up, Mayreder lived in a large household and received an education that was typical of the well-off. Mayreder was taught to play the piano, sing, speak French, and draw by private tutors. However, Mayreder was jealous that her less academically inclined brothers were given more educational opportunities. Later, the impact of this schooling would become evident, as Mayreder would revolt against the way girls were educated among the middle class. She criticized the sexual double standard and prostitution. At seventy, in 1928, she was recognized as an honorary citizen in Vienna. One such instance of rebellion was her decision to never wear a corset when she turned eighteen. This act of defiance was not only a social statement but a personal dig against her mother, who believed it was a woman's duty to derive her sense of self from her husband and sons.

As she grew into adulthood, Mayreder was exposed to a plethora of artists, writers, and philosophers. One of the most influential activities on Mayreder's future were her frequent meetings with Josef Storck, Wiener Kunstgewebeschule, Rudolf von Waldheim, Friedrich Eckstein, and her brothers Karl, Julius, and Rudolf. Additionally, the writings of Nietzsche, Goethe, and Kant had a significant influence on her as well. Her exposure to people such as these allowed Mayreder to come in contact with those who acknowledged the discrepancies between men and women in society and encouraged her to pursue involvement in the sociological issues she believed in.

In 1881, Rosa married the architect Karl Mayreder, who later became rector of the technical university in Vienna. The marriage was harmonious but remained childless. In 1883, Rosa had an abortion, and she also had two affairs, which she describes in detail in her diaries. Karl suffered repeated depressions from 1912 until his death in 1935.

== Feminism, writing, and art ==
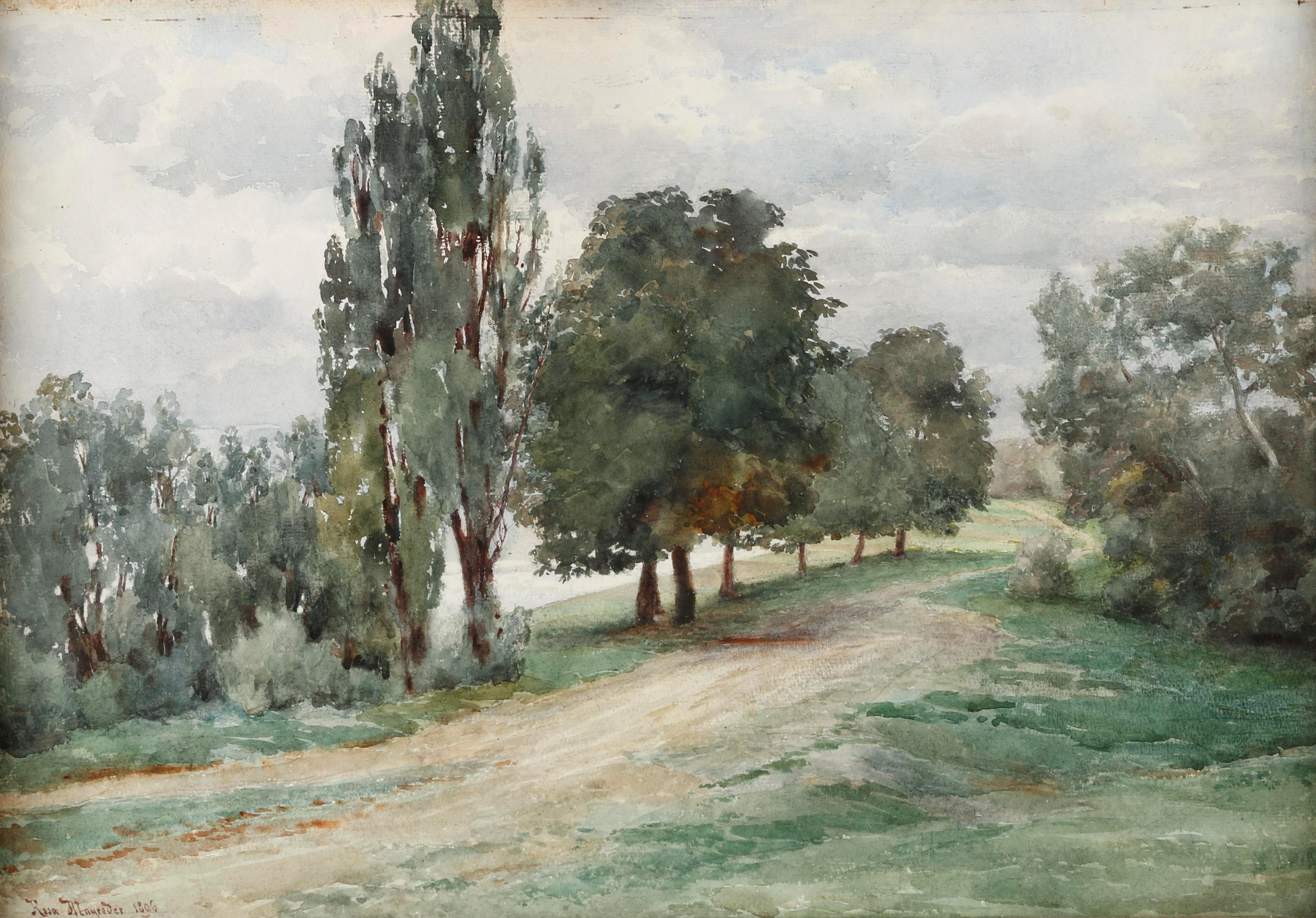
Landschaft, 1896, Dorotheum, Austria

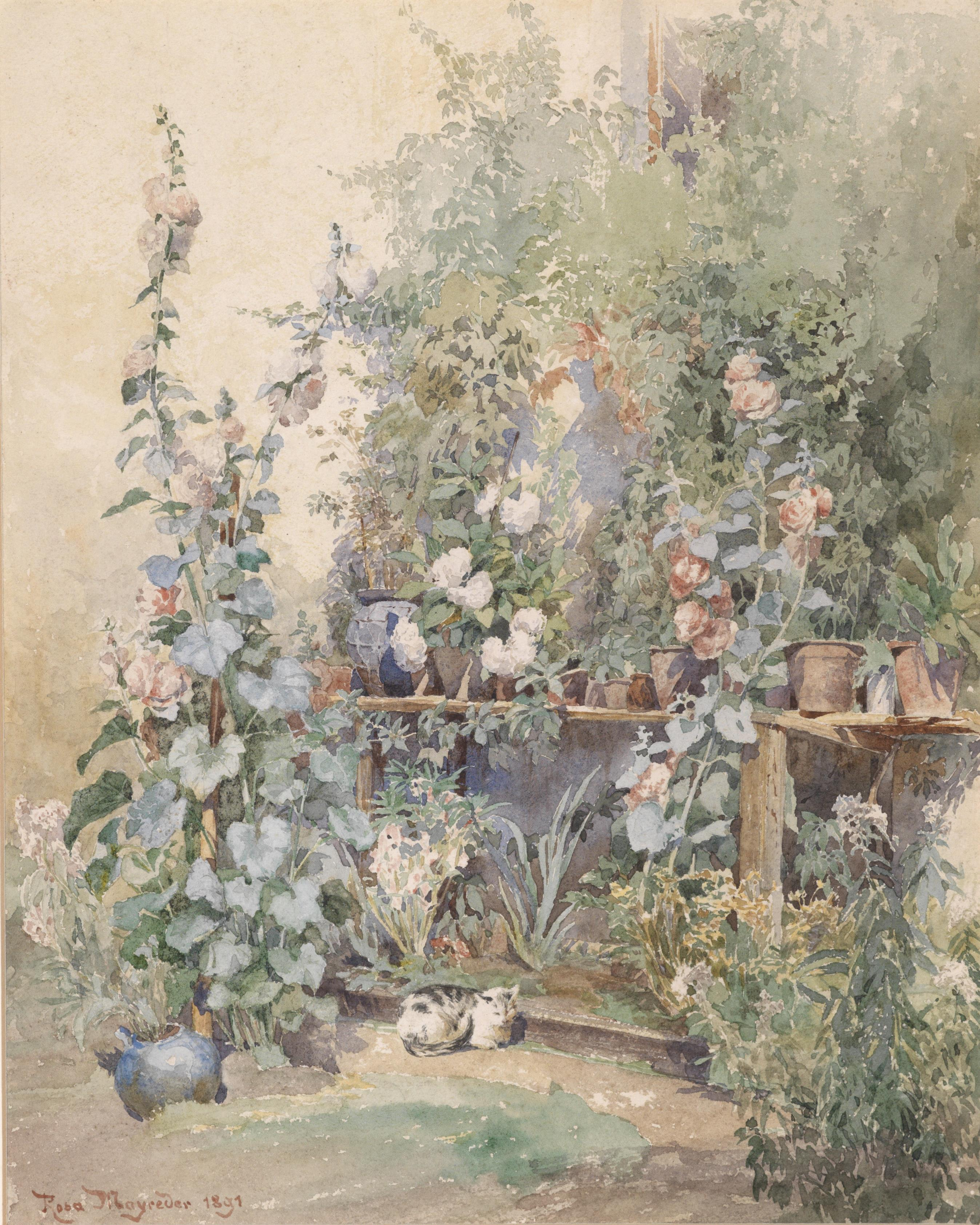
Gartenstilllben mit Kätzchen (Gardening with Kitten), 1891, Dorotheum, Austria

Rosa Mayreder was a radical critic of the patriarchal structures of society as well as a critic of feminism. Throughout her adult life, Rosa Mayreder expressed her frustration with the lack of authentic expression for women throughout history. A good deal of her critiques of society aimed at reforming the imbalance between men and women and expanding the roles which women could take up and be engaged in more generally. Mayreder considered fighting for the rights of women to be her calling in life, and she was aware that her attempts at fighting the status quo were groundbreaking for her time. While she was accused of being "bluestocking," or misbehaving, she continued to openly criticize her environment.

Mayreder published two influential works, one being Zur Kritik der Weiblichkeit (To Critics of Femininity) in 1905 (later published in English as A Survey of the Woman Problem in 1912). This was a collection of essays that refuted quotes from "accepted" philosophers and established authoritative support, a style of writing that was inspired by the ideals of the seventeenth and eighteenth centuries. Her inspiration for writing A Survey of the Women Problem steamed from her belief that the basis of the women's movement was caused by three issues: economic, social, and ethical-psychological sources. Mayreder's second influential publication was Geschlecht und Kultur (Sex and Culture) (1923). The latter work, which criticized the double standard and discrimination against women, was translated into English. She also published an autobiography, Das Haus in der Landskrongasse.

During World War I Mayreder published articles and reports in which she advocated a pacifist approach in various media outlets, including Neues Frauenleben and Internationale Rundschau.

In addition to writing, Mayreder took a liking for painting and became the first woman admitted to the Aquarellist club. In 1981, one of her watercolours was accepted for an exhibition at the annual Viennese Kunstlerhaus (House of Artists). Furthermore, Mayreder founded the Kunstchule for Frauen und Madchen (Art School for Girls and Women) with Olga Prager, Marriane Hainisch, and Karl Federn.

Rosa Mayreder was one of the founding members of the General Austrian Women's Association. She met Rudolf Steiner (with whom she entered into a long and extensive correspondence) through women's rights campaigner Marie Lang. She also met Hugo Wolf and Friedrich Eckstein. Rosa formed a warm friendship with Wolf and developed one of her stories as the libretto for his opera Der Corregidor, which was first performed in Mannheim in 1896. During these years, she published her first novel Aus meiner Jugend (From My Youth). It was also in Lang's circle that Rosa met Marianne Hainisch with whom she worked in the Austrian women's association "Allgemeiner Österreichischer Frauenverein", which was formed in 1902.

Rosa Mayreder was the only female founding member of the Sociological Association of Vienna, which was initiated in 1907. During World War I Mayreder engaged in the peace movement and became in 1919 the chairman of the "Internationale Frauenliga für Frieden und Freiheit" (International Women's League for Peace and Liberty, IFFF).

Mayreder was an influence on Swedish literary critic Klara Johanson.

== Rosa Mayreder and Nietzsche’s philosophy ==
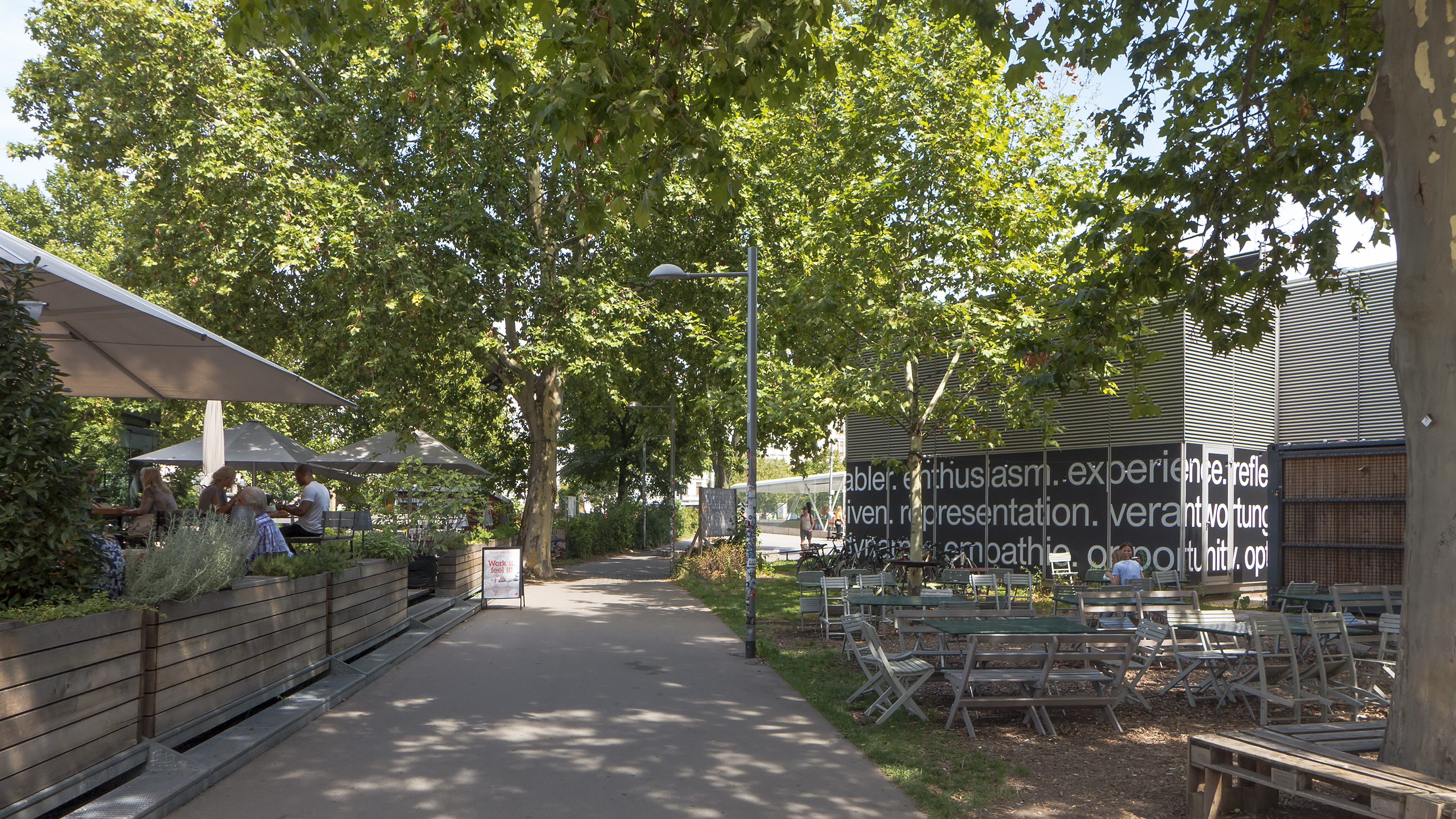
Rosa-Mayreder-Park in Wien 4, Peter Gugerell, 2017

In her early publications on various social issues such as feminism and public health, Mayreder was enthusiastically appreciative of the work of Nietzsche. In her later writings in the late 1920s, Mayreder became more critical of Nietzsche's writings as well as the excesses of the emerging cult around Nietzsche's philosophy; however, she did not abandon her overall appreciation of Nietzsche.

== Books ==
- A Survey of the Woman Problem. New York, George H. Doran Compagny (1913). Trans. of Zur Kritik der Weiblichkeit (1905)
- Askese Und Erotik (Asceticism and Eroticism)
- Idole (Idol)

== See also ==
- List of Austrian writers
