= Julius Mayreder =

Austrian architect

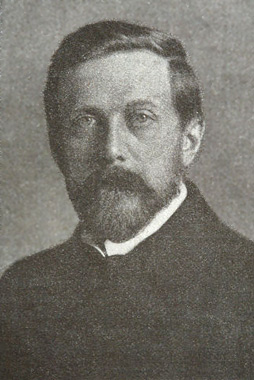
- Born: 26 June 1860; Vienna, Austria
- Died: 15 January 1911 (aged 50)
- Occupation: Architect
- Awards: Prix de Rome, 1887
- Practice: Architect

Julius Mayreder (26 June 1860 – 15 January 1911) was an Austrian architect.

== Early life ==
Mayreder was born the son of Leopold (1823–1892), a restaurateur and hotelier, and Henriette Rettmeyer (1834–1923). His siblings were Karl Mayreder (1856–1935), also a prominent Austrian architect; and Rudolf (1865–1937), a lawyer, civil engineer, and contractor. He married Marie Einsle (1873–1958) in 1904 and had a son, Frederick (1905–1954), also an architect.

== Education ==
From 1878 to 1880, Mayreder studied at the Technical University in Vienna, but left after two years to pursue greater artistic freedom. From 1880 to 1882, he was a student at a Kunstgewerbeschule (school of arts and crafts). Between 1883 and 1886, he studied at the Academy of Fine Arts Vienna (Akademie der bildenden Künste) under Friedrich von Schmidt. In 1887, he traveled in Greece, Constantinople, Italy, Germany, and France on a Prix de Rome scholarship, awarded to promising arts students.

== Career ==
Mayreder began work in the offices of the architects Victor Luntz and Adolf Lang (in Budapest) in 1888. In 1890, he worked in the architectural studio of Franz von Neumann. Beginning in 1891, he worked as an independent architect.

He collaborated frequently with his brothers Karl and Rudolf. In 1893, they won a competition to manage construction in Stubenviertel, close to Vienna's historic city center. They also won second prize for a project to manage construction in all of Vienna.

Mayreder designed many buildings, both residential and industrial. As an architect, Mayreder favored a Baroque style. He was also a founding member of the Vienna Secession in 1897.

Mayreder died in 1911 of a brain disease. He is buried at Zentralfriedhof, the "central cemetery" of Vienna.

=== Selected works ===
- 1894, Cemetery chapel, Bystřice pod Hostýnem
- 1895, Villa Schenker, Vienna (no longer exists)
- 1896, tombs of Spitzer Lukasc and the Schenker Family, Heiligenstadt cemetery, Vienna
- 1898–1899, Villa Ernst Regenhart, Czech Republic
- 1900-1901, "Zum Herrnhuter" ("Moravians house"), residential and commercial building, Vienna
- c. 1901, Tilgner Fountain, Vienna
- 1902, House, Naglergasse 6, Vienna
- 1902, Vienna Bicycle Club, Vienna (no longer exists)
- 1905, Pension Fortino, Grado, Friuli-Venezia Giulia, Italy
- c. 1906, Home of Rudolf Mayreder (brother), Dürnstein

== Gallery ==
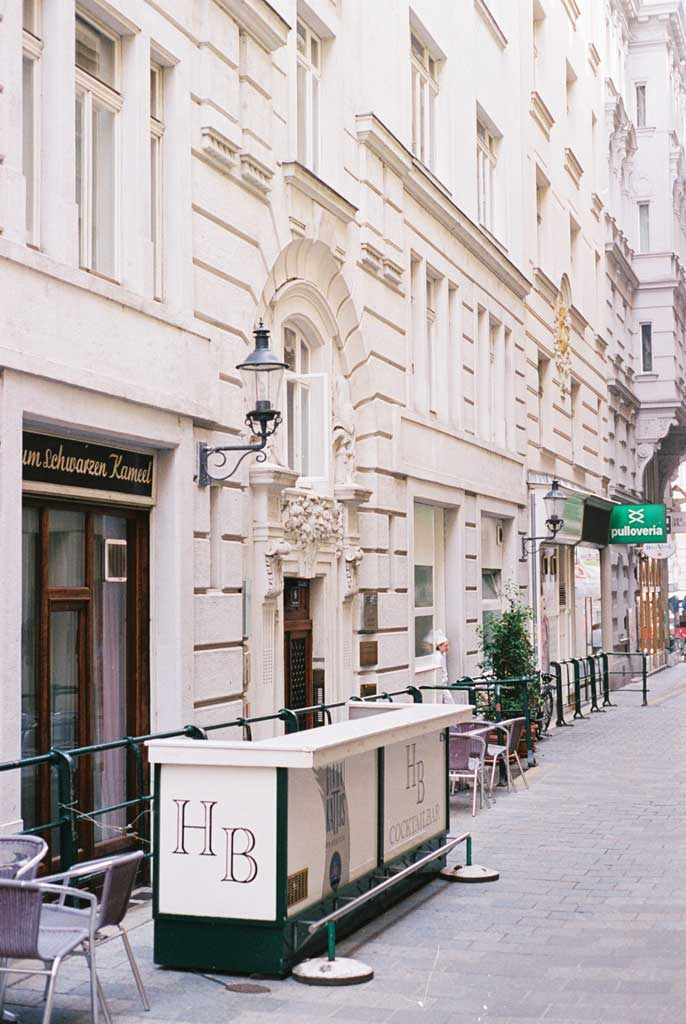
Naglergasse 6, Vienna

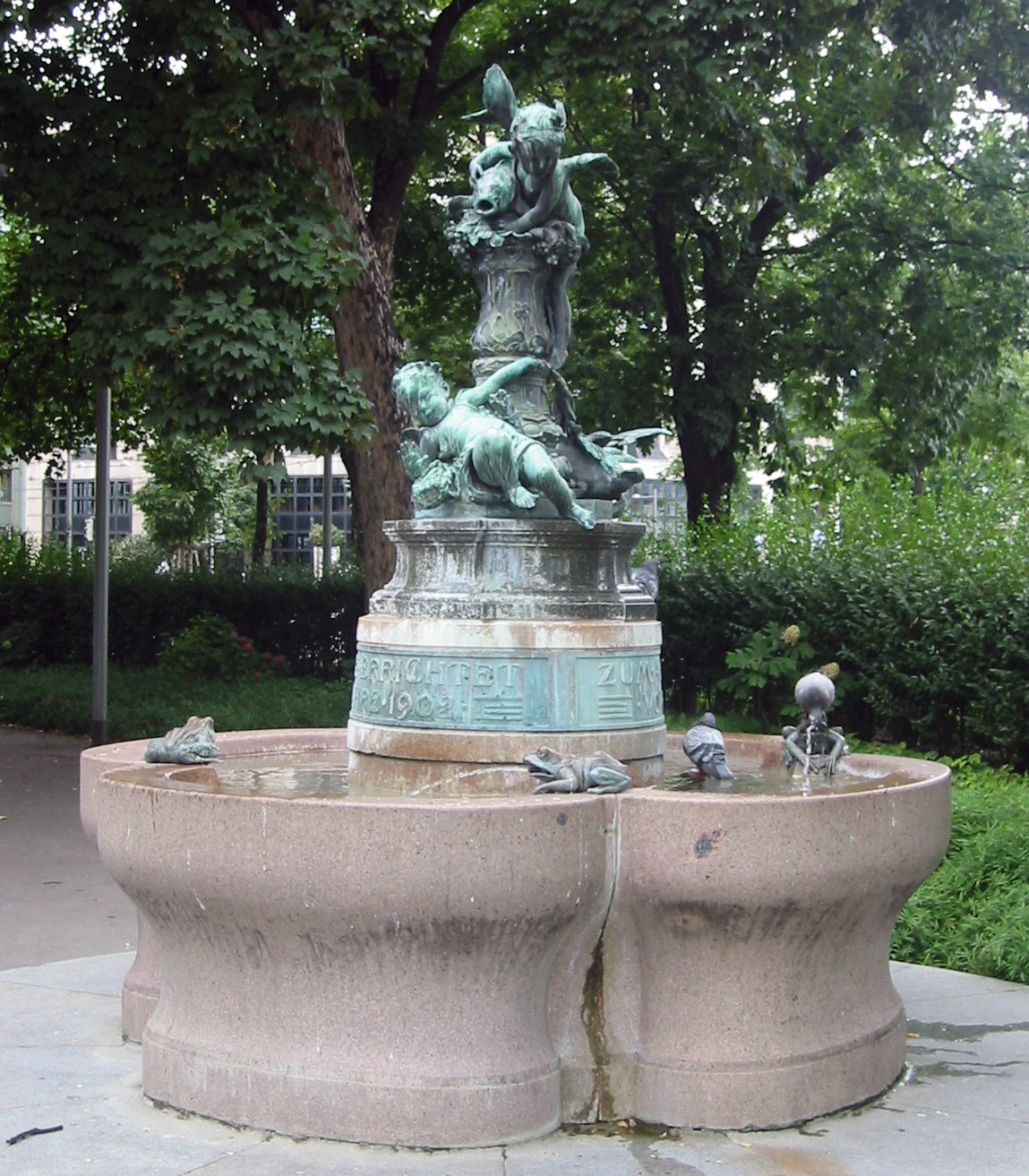
Tilgner Fountain, Vienna

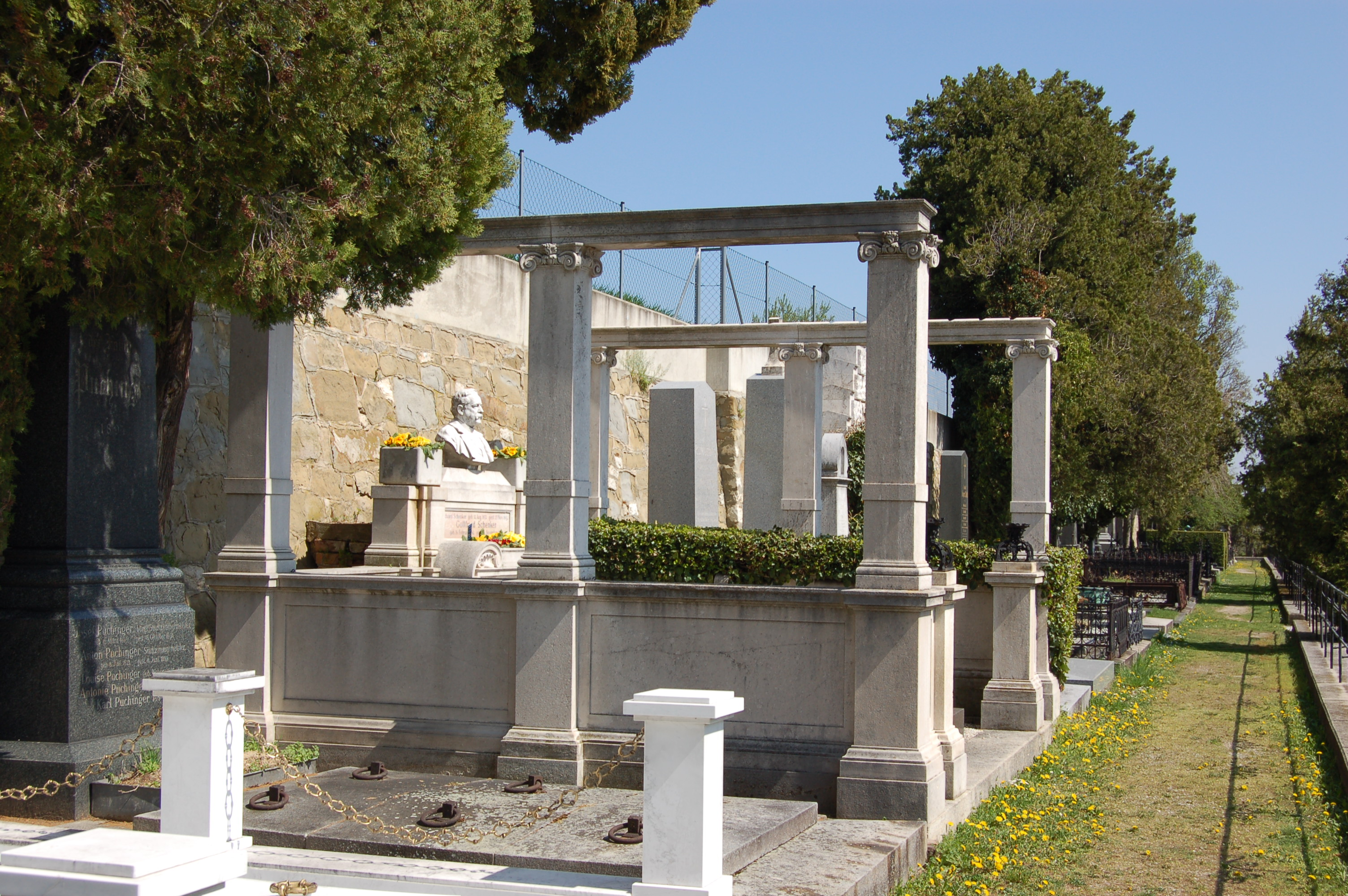
Schenker tomb, Heiligenstadt cemetery, Vienna

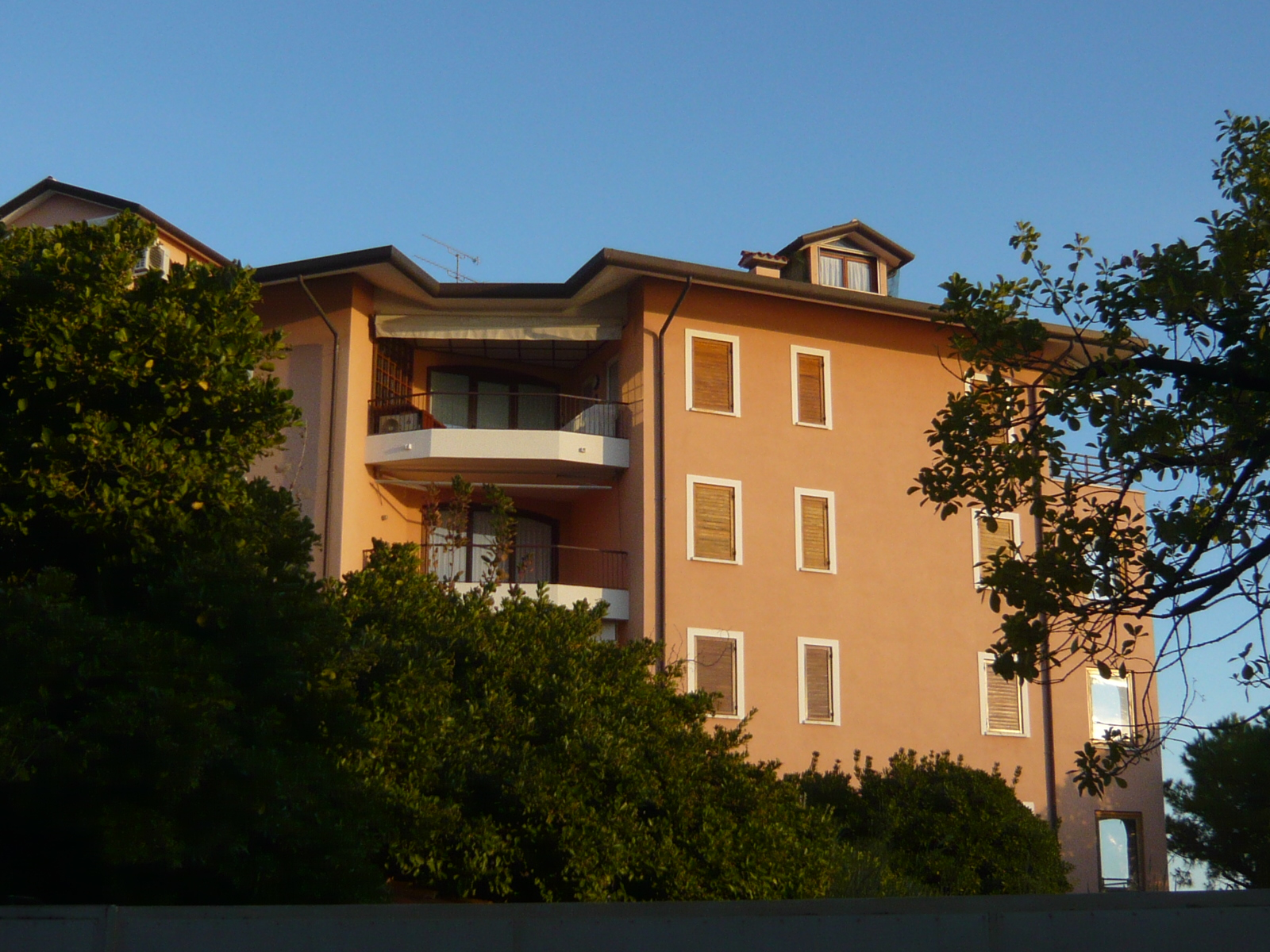
Pension Fortino, Grado
