= Karl Mayreder =

Austrian architect

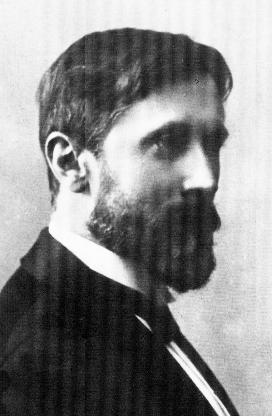
Karl Mayreder

Karl Mayreder (13 June 1856, Vienna – 9 September 1935, Vienna) was an Austrian architect.

== Life and work ==
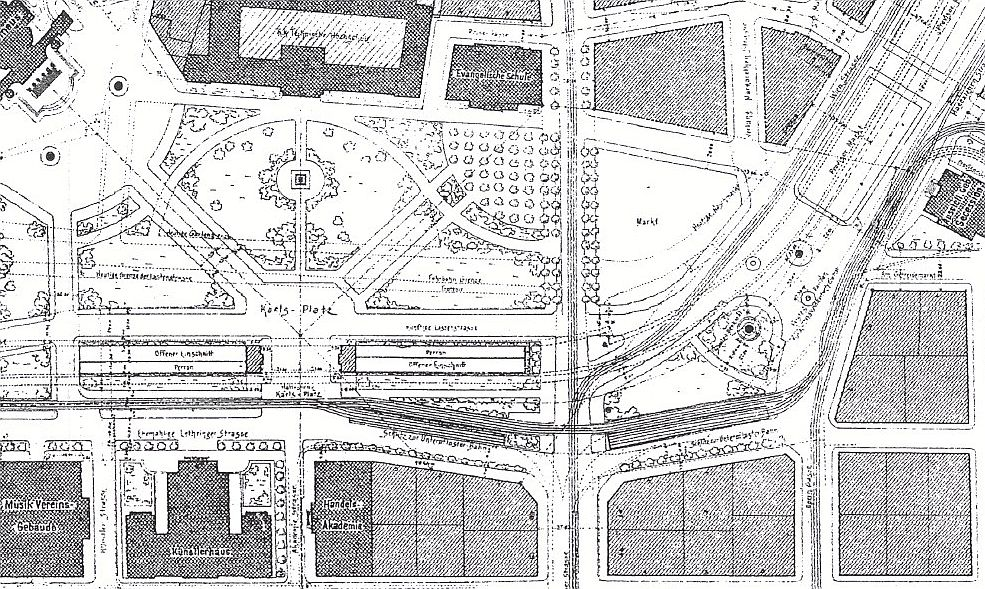
Mayreder's designs for the Karlsplatz

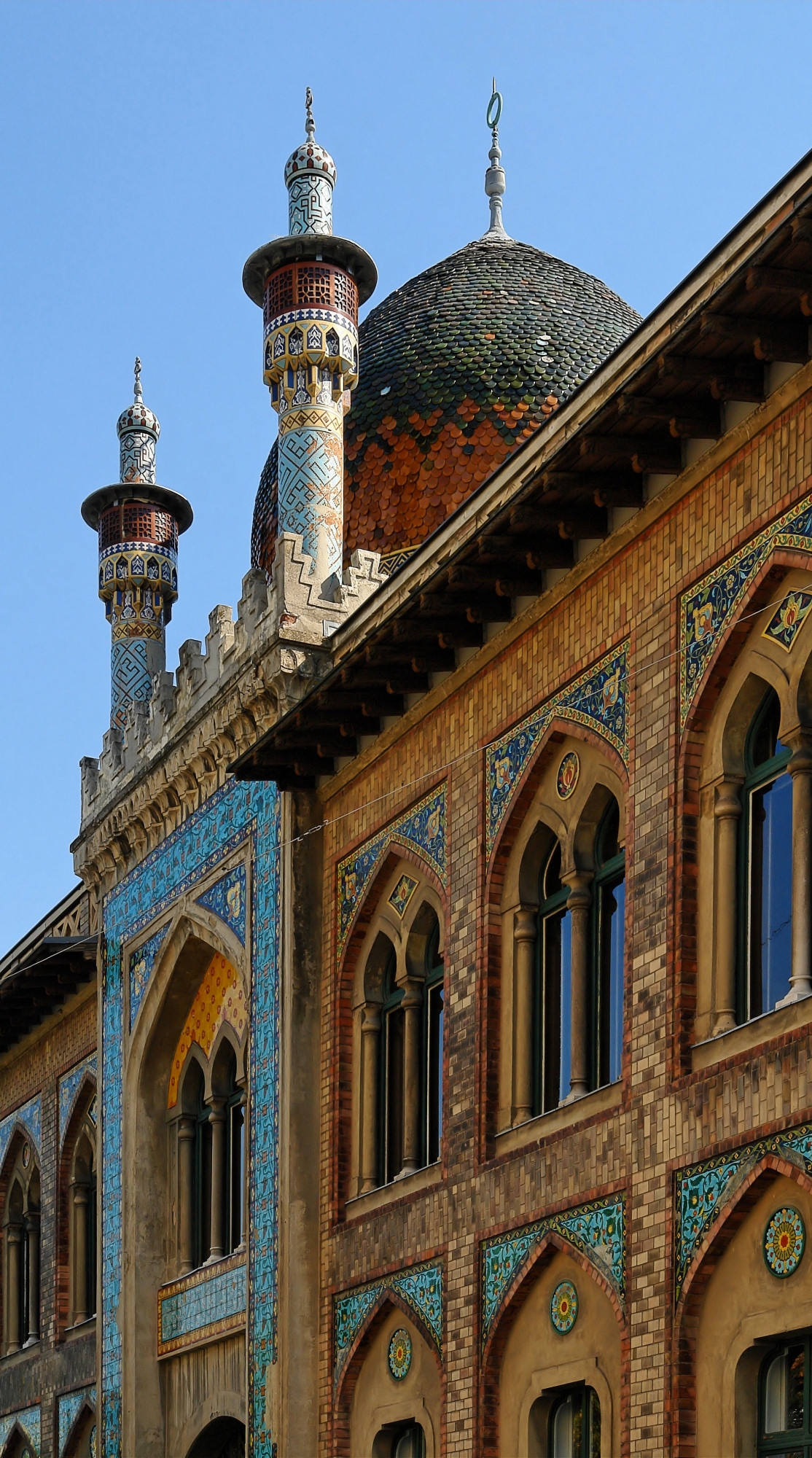
The Zacherl factory in Unterdöbling

Karl Mayreder was born the son of hotelier Leopold Mayreder and his wife Henriette Mayreder. Leopold Mayreder had taken over the famous hotel “Matschakerhof” at number 5 in the Spiegelgasse/number 7 in the Seilergasse in the first district of Vienna from his father and ran it successfully.

Karl Mayreder studied from 1872 to 1877 at the Vienna University of Technology, where he was a student of Heinrich von Ferstel and later an assistant to Carl König. As a student, he met Rosa Obermayer, who was interested in the sciences and in improving women’s status in society. They met during a regular discussion round in a restaurant. Such meetings presented the only opportunity available to Obermayer to develop herself in line with her ideals. They married in 1881. Karl Mayreder was employed between 1880 and 1884 in von Ferstel’s atelier.

From 24 January 1885, Mayreder was a member of the Vienna Künstlerhaus. In 1888, he also became a member of the Österreichischer Ingenieur- und Architektenverein (Austrian Association of Engineers and Architects). In 1893, he and his brothers Julius and Rudolf Mayreder (the latter of whom founded the construction firm Mayreder-Kraus) won the competition to manage construction in the Stubenviertel. They also won second prize for a project to manage construction in all of Vienna. Between 1894 and 1902, Mayreder was the head of the city bureau for planning in the department for construction. He was responsible for numerous planning projects, including the creation of many new streets cutting through previous man-made or natural barriers. This position also led him to be selected as a member of the jury for city planning competitions in several European cities. In 1907 he was called to draw up the urban plan of Rovereto (South Tyrol).

In 1898, Mayreder was made a professor extraordinarius for Propaedeutics of Architecture. In 1900, he was named a professor ordinarius for Architecture in Antiquity. He was furthermore the driving power behind the introduction of a Chair for Town Planning at the University of Technology. From 1923, he held the position of rector at the university, but in 1925 he was forced into early retirement through ill health. In 1929, he was named an honorary doctor of the Graz University of Technology.

Mayreder also worked as an architect on contract to private individuals. He built several palazzos and other buildings, although it is unsure in many cases if he initiated the work.

Karl Mayreder is buried in Vienna’s Zentralfriedhof in the Mayreder family grave. He lies beside his wife Rosa Mayreder, his parents Leopold and Henriette Mayreder, his brother Julius Mayreder and his sisters.

From 1997, the reverse of the Austrian 500 schilling note depicted Rosa and Karl Mayreder alongside a group picture of the female participants at the Federal Convention of Austrian Women’s Associations, which took place in Vienna in 1911.

== Selected works ==
- Palais Oberleitner, Šumperk
- Palais Isbary, Vienna
- Kreuzherrenhof, Vienna
- Zacherl insecticide factory, Vienna
