= Women's suffrage in Austria =

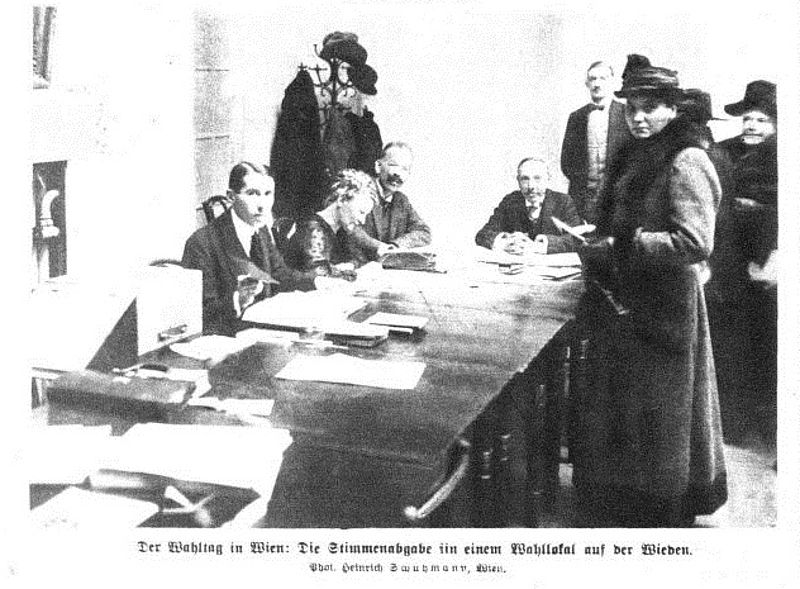
Women in Vienna voting for the National Constituent Assembly in February 1919

Women's suffrage was introduced in Austria on 12 November 1918 with the foundation of the Republic of Austria after the fall of the Habsburg monarchy with the end of World War I. While men had gained the right to vote in the years of 1861 until 1907, women were explicitly excluded from political participation since the February Patent in 1861. Only unmarried landholding women were allowed to vote, before 1907.

== Suffrage movements ==
Women's organisations that existed since the German revolutions of 1848–1849 were focusing on improving educational and career opportunities as well as labour rights. Only at the end of the 19th century, women started to demand women's suffrage.

The suffrage movement in Austria didn't unite at first because of differing approaches between different groups. The two main groups were the Social Democrats and the bourgeois-radical Allgemeiner Österreichischer Frauenverein, founded in 1893 by Auguste Fickert. Both had close alliances with their respective parties. The Social Democratic Party of Austria was the first political party to demand universal suffrage for men and women, although introducing men's suffrage was more important for the party and women's suffrage was often left out of negotiations as a compromise. Adelheid Popp was a leading figure in the Social Democratic women's movement and on 1 October 1893 she organised a protest for women's suffrage in Vienna.

In 1902, Marianne Hainisch founded the Bund Österreichischer Frauenvereine in order to create an umbrella organisation for the Austrian women's organisations and in order to be better able to network also internationally. More than the Social Democrats and the Allgemeiner Österreichsicher Frauenverein, both of which were careful in their demands or were focusing more on other topics, Bund Österreichischer Frauenvereine was very vocal in demanding women's suffrage. While the law of associations from 1867 prohibited the foundation of an explicitly political association, Ernestine Fürth in 1905 initiated a committee for women's suffrage within the structures of Bund Österreichischer Frauenvereine. An appeal to turn this committee into an own association was rejected in 1907.

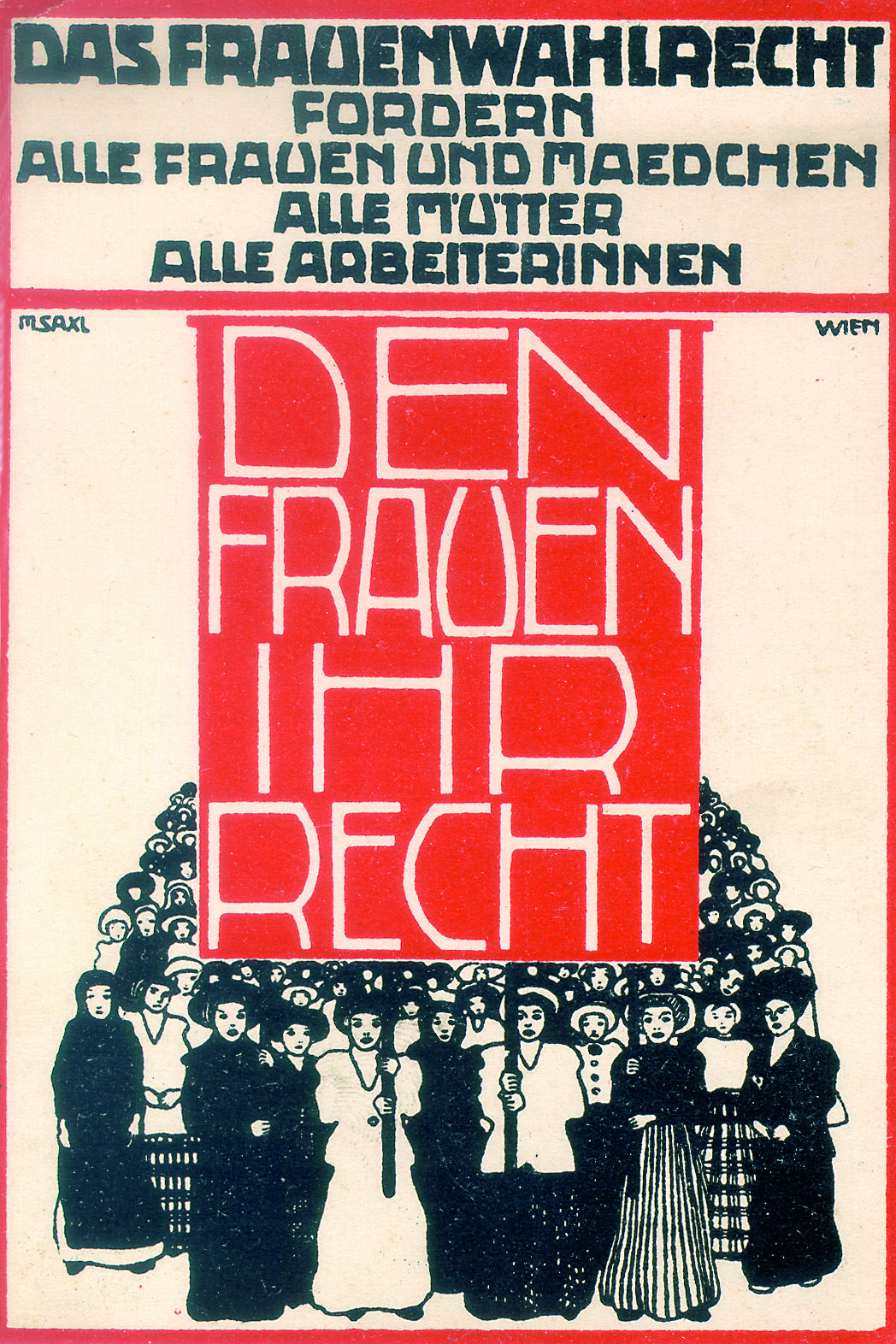
Poster by Marianne Saxl-Deutsch for the 1912 Women's Day in Vienna

In the 1910s, activism for women's suffrage increased. The women's suffrage committee within Bund Österreichischer Frauenvereine from 1911 on published the magazine Zeitschrift für Frauen-Stimmrecht around women's suffrage and the committee was founded in several cities across Austria. Inspired by a speech by German socialist Clara Zetkin about introducing an International Women's Day, Adelheid Popp and other Social Democrats organised a demonstration for women's suffrage in Vienna on 19 March 1911. According to Arbeiter-Zeitung, around 20.000 women and also men participated in the demonstration. Signs like "Heraus das Frauenwahlrecht" or "Hoch das Frauenwahlrecht" were shown at the demonstration. The demonstration happened annually, even during World War I.

== Introduction of women's suffrage ==
Still during the war, in a parliamentary assembly on 30 May 1917, Social Democrat Karl Seitz demanded to treat women as equal citizens. In October 1918, bourgeois and Social Democratic women's organisations wrote a common petition to the national assembly.

On 12 November 1918, the day that the Republic was announced, the law of state and government reform was introduced. Article 9 of the reform mentioned that suffrage for the election of the Austrian Parliament should be universal and without making a difference between genders. Social Democrat Karl Renner drafted the law and he later recalled that he tried to frame women's suffrage as obvious and not to place too much attention on the topic. The Constituent National Assembly in February 1919 was the first time that women could participate in national elections in Austria. Anna Boschek, Emmy Freundlich, Adelheid Popp, Leopoldine Glöckel, Gabriele Proft, Therese Schlesinger, Amalie Seidel and Maria Tusch (all Social Democrats) as well as Hildegard Burjan (Christian Social Party) were the first women to be elected into parliament.

All Social Democrats were in favour of introducing the law, the Christian Social Party and the German National Party were originally against it, but the Christian Social Party was eventually convinced to introduce it. They wanted to only introduce women's suffrage if the law included compulsory voting as they were afraid that their female voter base could be less easily convinced to participate in elections than women voting for the Social Democrats. Compulsory voting in the end could be introduced by the Federal States of Austria, which took place in Tyrol and Vorarlberg.

Until 1930, women and men voted with envelopes in different colors, which made it possible to analyse political preferences according to gender. This was important for the established political parties, as they didn't know how the introduction of women's suffrage would affect the political landscape.

Sex workers were excluded from voting based on "moral" grounds and only in 1923, this was changed.
