= 1919 in women's history =

This is a listing of noteworthy historical events relating to the international women's movement which occurred in 1919.

== Events ==
=== January ===
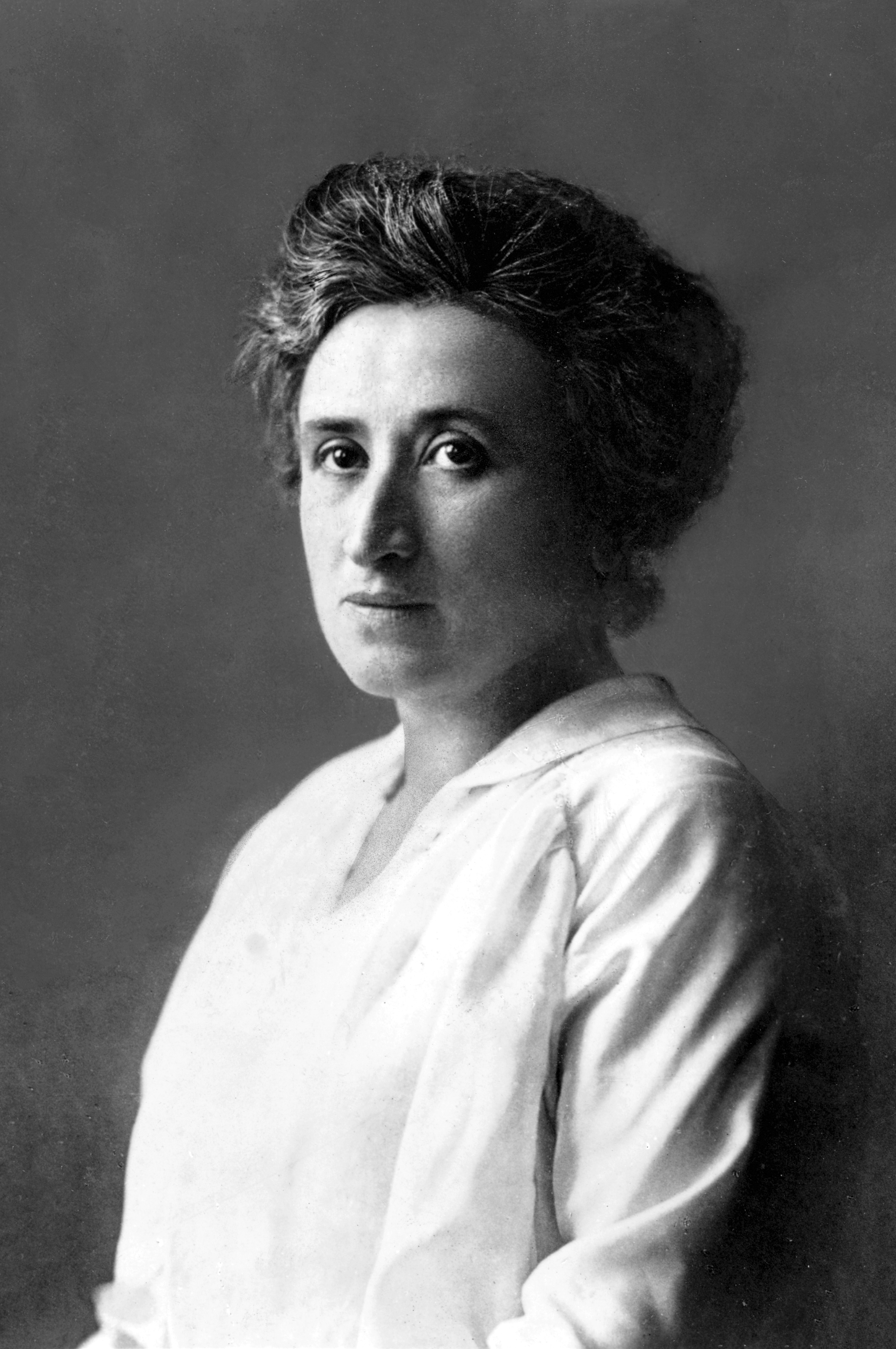
German socialist revolutionary Rosa Luxemburg.

- January 1919: Czechoslovakia — Under the terms of the Electoral Rules for Settlements in Czechoslovakia, Act 75, adopted in January 1919, men and women in the Czech area of the country were granted equal voting rights in municipal elections.
- 1 January 1919: Canada — Women were granted the right to be candidates in federal elections.
- 15 January 1919: Germany — Revolutionary socialist anti-war activist Rosa Luxemburg was murdered by right wing nationalist soldiers.
- 19 January 1919: Germany — Under the terms of the Weimar Constitution women were accorded equality in access to education, equal opportunity in appointments to the civil service, and equal pay.
- 26 January 1919: Poland — Five women — Gabriela Balicka-Iwanowska, Jadwiga Dziubińska, Irena Kosmowska, Maria Moczydłowska, and Zofia Moraczewska — were elected to the first Parliament, after the establishment of the Second Polish Republic.

=== February ===
- 4 February 1919: Belarus — Women were granted the right to vote and stand in elections.
- 10 February 1919: U.S. Senate defeats women's suffrage amendment.
- 10 February 1919: Paris, France — The Inter-Allied Women's Conference, also known as the Suffragist Conference of the Allied Countries and the United States, convened to compile a list of women's issues to present to the delegates of the Paris Peace Conference, since they were barred from the official conference.
- 14–16 February 1919: Georgia — Women participated for the first time in national voting, electing members of the constitutional assembly. On 2 December 1918 Peri-Khan Sofiyeva (Azerbaijani: Pərixan Sofiyeva, Georgian: ფარიხან სოფიევა), an Azerbaijani woman living in Georgia was elected to serve on a local counsel for the village council of Karajala, in the Kakheti Region, and she began her term as a regional representative in parliamentary elections held in 1919.
- 16 February 1919: Austria — Women were allowed to vote for the first time. Eight women were elected, including 7 representatives of the Social Democratic Party of Austria: Anna Boschek, Emmy Freundlich, Adelheid Popp, Gabriele Proft, Therese Schlesinger, Amalie Seidel and Maria Tusch; and 1 for the Christian Social Party: Hildegard Burjan.
- 22 February 1919: Isle of Man — Women were able to run as candidates in elections for the first time, when universal suffrage was granted, though property restrictions for voters continued until 1969.
- 26 February 1919: Maine – The State Senate passed a resolution allowing women to vote for presidential electors.

=== March ===
- 6 March 1919: Michigan — Women voted for the first time under a state law which had been approved in November 1918. The first woman to exercise the vote was Rosa John, the wife of a prominent Syrian merchant.
- 9 March 1919: Italy — The Sacchi Bill was introduced, which eliminated husbands' superiority in family law; giving women the right to control their own property, have equal guardianship of their children, stand for public office and enter professions. (The bill was approved by the Senate commission and passed without change in July). Simultaneously, the Sichel agenda was proposed, which would have given Italian women the vote. Before a vote of the Senate was called, the legislature adjourned.
- 10 March 1919: Ukraine — Women were granted the right to vote.
- 17 March 1919: Canton of Neuchâtel, Switzerland — The Council agreed to put the question of women's suffrage on the ballot to be decided by voters.
- 19 March 1919: Maine – The State House passed a resolution allowing women to vote for presidential electors.
- 21 March 1919: Hungarian Soviet Republic — Universal suffrage was extended to trade union members only; with the dissolution of the Republic, in August 1919 the law was overturned and universal suffrage did not exist again until 1945.
- 28 March 1919: Missouri – Women were granted the right to vote for presidential electors by the state legislature. The Governor signed the legislation on 5 April.

=== April ===
- 9 April 1919: British East Africa (now Kenya) — Legislators passed in the third reading a franchise bill, Legislative Council Ordinance No.16, giving equal adult suffrage for women and men of "pure European descent", who were English-speaking, literate British subjects and owned property. It specifically excluded Africans and British subjects from India, or other locations outside of Europe.
- 17 April 1919: New Brunswick, Canada — women were granted complete universal suffrage.

=== May ===
- 3 May 1919: Atlanta, Georgia — White women were granted the right to vote in municipal elections.
- 8 May 1919: Luxembourg — The constitutional assembly extended the right to vote to all citizens over age 21, regardless of sex. The new constitution went into force on 15 May 1919.
- 9 May 1919: Belgium — Women, as proxies for heroic men who died in World War I, who were widows or single mothers of servicemen killed in action, who had been political prisoners held by the enemy, or who were themselves involved in the resistance movement were allowed to vote and be candidates.
- 12–17 May 1919: Zürich, Switzerland — The Second International Women's Congress for Peace and Freedom denounced the final terms of the Treaty of Versailles ending World War I and renamed the peace organization founded in 1915 as the Women's International League for Peace and Freedom.
- 15 May 1919: Isle of Jersey, (Channel Islands) — Single women over age 20 were given the right to vote in local elections.
- 16 May 1919: Crown Colony of Jamaica, British West Indies — Women of twenty-five years or more, who earned £50 or more per year, or paid taxes of £2 annually became eligible to vote.
- 20 May 1919: France — The Chamber of Deputies passed a bill to grant equal suffrage to women with 377 deputies in favor and 97 against. The measure did not pass the Senate, delaying women's voting rights until 1944.
- 24 May 1919: Sweden — Women were granted the right to vote.

=== June ===
- 5 June 1919: The National Suffrage Amendment, the Nineteenth Amendment to the United States Constitution, passed by Congress.
- 10 June 1919: Illinois, Wisconsin and Michigan, in that order, became the first three states to ratify the National Suffrage Amendment.
- 15 June 1919: Czechoslovakia — Women and men in the Czech areas first voted under equal suffrage for municipal candidates.
- 16 June 1919: Kansas, Ohio, and New York, in that order, ratified 19th Amendment.
- 17 June 1919: Illinois — Because of a minor error in the text of the initial introduction to the resolution to ratify the 19th Amendment, both the State Senate and House reconfirmed ratification of women's suffrage. After submitting a brief to explain the legality of the amendment itself had not been in jeopardy and the second vote was merely a legal formality, Illinois was acknowledged by the U.S. Secretary of State as the first state to ratify the federal amendment.
- 19 June 1919: Pennsylvania — The State Senate ratified the 19th Amendment.
- 21 June 1919: Armenia — The first elections under universal suffrage were held. Three women were elected Perchuhi Partizpanyan-Barseghyan, Varvara Sahakyan and Katarine Zalyan-Manukyan, who served until the government collapsed in 1920.
- 24 June 1919: Pennsylvania — The State House ratified the 19th Amendment, making the state the 7th to endorse the federal amendment.
- 25 June 1919: Massachusetts — The State House ratified the 19th Amendment by a vote of 185 in favor and 47 against and the State Senate by 34 for and 5 against, making the state the 8th to ratify the federal amendment.
- 28 June 1919: Texas — The State legislature ratified the 19th Amendment, making the state the 9th to approve the federal amendment.
- 28–29 June 1919: Canton of Neuchâtel, Switzerland — Voters rejected granting women the right to vote.

=== July ===
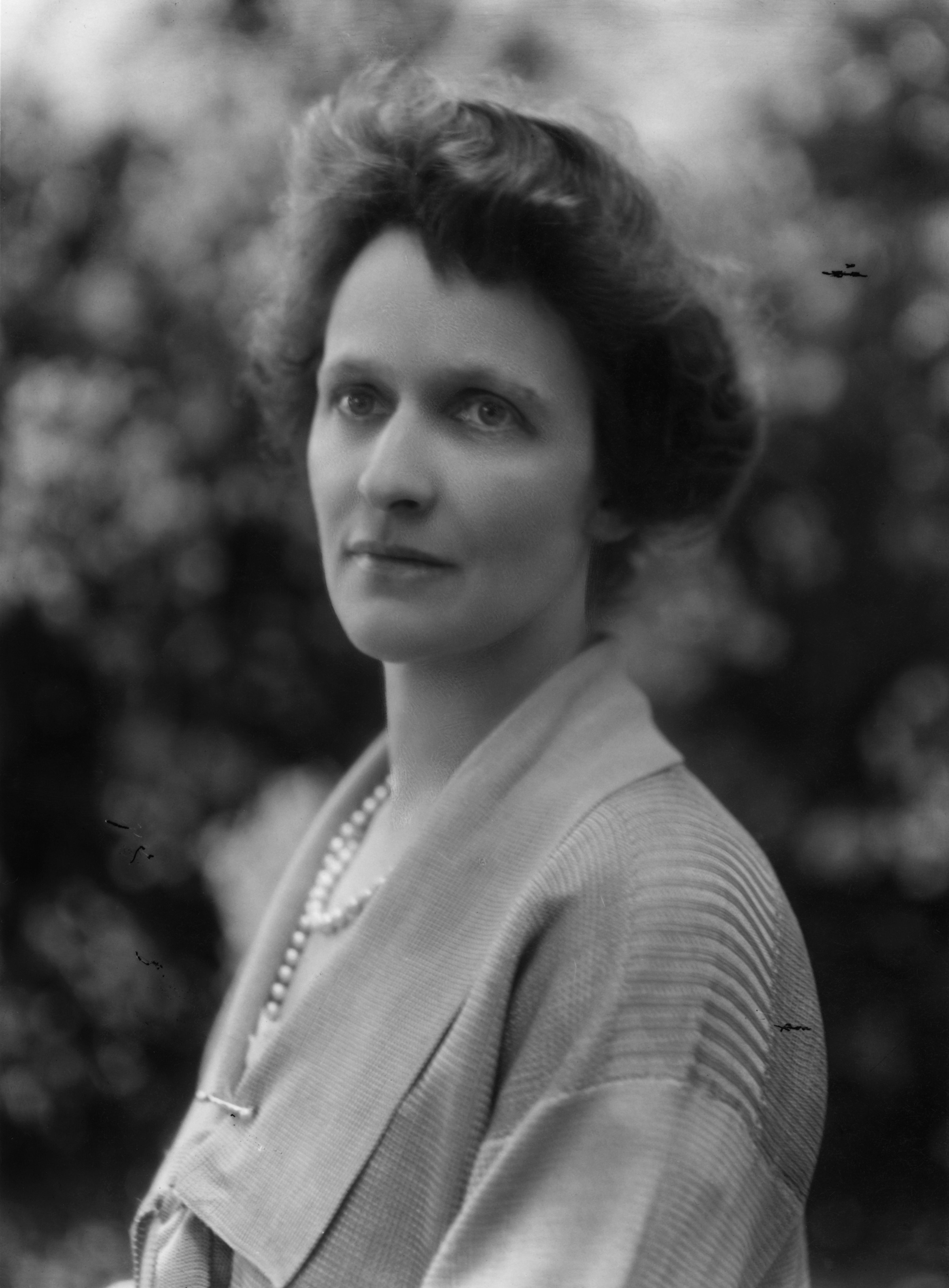
Conservative Nancy Astor, first female member of the British parliament.

- 2 July 1919: Iowa — In a special session of the legislature called by the governor, both the State House and Senate approved ratification of the Nineteenth Amendment.
- 3 July 1919: Missouri — Both the State Senate and State House ratified the 19th Amendment.
- 4 July 1919: British Rhodesia — The Women's Enfranchisement Ordinance gained the assent of the High Commissioner allowing women of age 21 or older to vote and serve as members of the Legislative Council, provided they met the occupational and salary qualifications. Married women automatically had the same rights as their husbands, as long as the couple lived together in a non-polygamous relationship and he met the income requirements.
- 12 July 1919: Isle of Jersey, (Channel Islands) — The passage of the Loi sur les Droits Electoraux gave the vote to married women whose husbands were ratepayers and women over 30 who paid rent of £10 or more per annum.
- 15 July 1919: The Vatican — Pope Benedict XV issued a declaration in support of women's political rights.
- 17 July 1919: Alabama — State Senate rejects ratification of the 19th Amendment with a vote of 19 against and 13 in favor.
- 21 July 1919: Azerbaijan — Women were granted the right to vote.
- 24 July 1919: Georgia — Both the State Senate and House rejected the ratification of the 19th Amendment to the US Constitution.
- 28 July 1919: Arkansas — After a State Senate vote of 29 in favor and 2 against and House vote of 75 for and 17 against, Arkansas became the 12th state to ratify the 19th Amendment.
- 31 July 1919: Montana — The State Senate ratified the 19th Amendment approving women's suffrage.

=== August ===
- 2 August 1919: Montana and Nebraska — The Montana State House ratified the 19th Amendment to which the governor immediately affixed his signature and the Nebraska State legislature unanimously ratified the federal amendment the same day.
- 11 August 1919: Germany — Under the Weimar Constitution, Germany granted women the right to vote.

=== September ===
- September 1919: Luxembourg — Women voted for the first time on a referendum concerning retaining the monarchy.
- 8 September 1919: Minnesota — The State House and State Senate ratified the Nineteenth Amendment with votes of 120 to 6 and 60 to 5, respectively.
- 10 September 1919: New Hampshire — The State Senate followed suit with the State House which had ratified the Nineteenth Amendment the previous day and passed the suffrage amendment with a vote of 14 for and 10 against.
- 17 September 1919: Alabama — State House rejects ratification of the Nineteenth Amendment with a vote of 60 against and 31 in favor. Alabama would not ratify the amendment until 8 September 1953.
- 18 September 1919: Netherlands — The Netherlands granted women the right to vote. The right to stand in election had previously been granted in 1917.
- 29–30 September 1919: Utah — At a special legislative session, the State Senate ratified the Nineteenth Amendment on the 29th and the following day the State House followed suit.

=== October ===
- October 1919: Italy — The Chamber of Deputies passed a bill giving literate women 21 and older and illiterate women 30 years and older, who were not criminals, deaf, lunatic, mute, paupers or prostitutes equal rights with male voters effective in 1920 for local elections. Parliament was later dissolved without the Senate voting on the measure.
- 26 October 1919: Luxembourg — Women participated for the first time in the parliamentary elections and Marguerite Thomas-Clement was elected, as the first woman parliamentarian.
- 28 October - 6 November 1919: Washington, D. C. — The International Congress of Working Women brought together over 200 women to discuss women's labor issues and present recommendations to the International Labour Organization.
- 29 October 1919: New Zealand — Women were allowed to stand for election into parliament. Rosetta Baume, Aileen Cooke, and Ellen Melville ran as the first female candidates, though none was elected.

=== November ===
- 1 November 1919: California — In a special legislative session, the State Senate unanimously voted in favor of the Nineteenth Amendment and the State House approved it with a vote of 73 for and 2 against, becoming the 18th state to ratify the federal amendment.
- 4 November 1919: Maine – The State Senate ratified the Nineteenth Amendment.
- 5 November 1919: Maine – The State House ratified the Nineteenth Amendment, making Maine the 19th state to approve ratification.
- 20 November 1919: Lithuania – The Council of Lithuania passed the Law on Elections legalizing universal suffrage to all citizens over the age of 21, which had been outlined in the Provisional Constitution of 1918.
- 26 November 1919: North Dakota – The State Senate ratified the 19th Amendment.

=== December ===
- 1 December 1919: England — Nancy Astor became the first woman to take her seat in the House of Commons.
- 1 December 1919: North Dakota — The State House ratified the 19th Amendment, becoming the 20th state to approve the federal amendment.
- 3–4 December 1919: South Dakota — On the 3rd, the State House adopted the federal suffrage amendment followed on the 4th by the State Senate's ratification of the Nineteenth Amendment.
- 12 December 1919: Colorado — In a special legislative session, both the State Senate and House unanimously ratified the Nineteenth Amendment. The governor signed the legislation three days later.
- 21 December 1919: United States — Anarchist Emma Goldman was deported from the United States to Soviet Russia.
- 22 December 1919: Australia — Grace Benny became the first Australian woman to sit on a local council.
- 23 December 1919: United Kingdom — The Sex Disqualification Act became law, enabling women to join the professions. In a broad opening statement it specified that, "[a] person shall not be disqualified by sex or marriage from the exercise of any public function, or from being appointed to or holding any civil or judicial office or post, or from entering or assuming or carrying on any civil profession or vocation". The Act did provide employment opportunities for individual women and many were appointed as magistrates, but in practice it fell far short of the expectations of the women's movement. Senior positions in the civil service were still closed to women and they could be excluded from juries if evidence was likely to be too "sensitive".

== See also ==
- Timeline of women's suffrage
