= Allgemeiner Österreichischer Frauenverein =

Austrian suffragette association

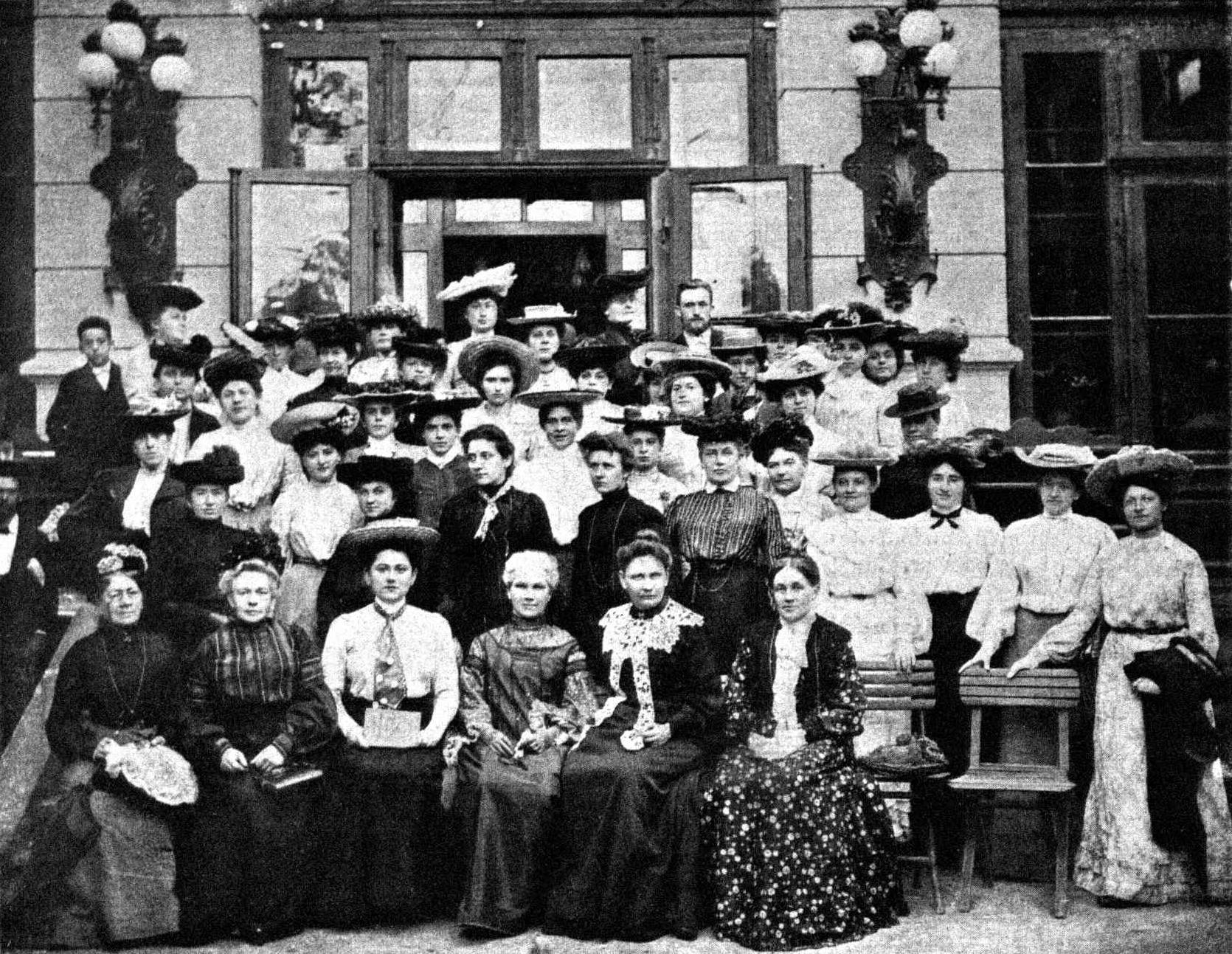
Meeting of the Allgemeiner Österreichischer Frauenverein 1904 in Vienna

The Allgemeiner Österreichischer Frauenverein (abbr. AÖFV, English: General Austrian Women's Association) (Note: This article generally uses native German names, but gives the English translations in brackets.) was an Austrian women's organization for women's suffrage, active between 1893 and 1919.

It was the main women's suffrage organisation in Austria.

== History ==
=== Background ===
During the Revolution of 1848, Karoline von Perin-Gradenstein founded the first Austrian women's association, the Wiener Demokratischer Frauenverein (Viennese Democratic Women's Association). However, in the aftermath of the violent suppression of the revolution, the political participation of women was forbidden and the club dissolved.

With the Vereinsgesetz (Law on Associations) of 1867 political associations were allowed again, but its §30 discriminated against "foreigners, female persons and minors", which meant that women could officially only participate in charitable or educational societies.

After the Revolution of 1848, a minority of women who owned significant property or a business had been given the right to vote in some local municipalities, and from 1861 also for the Landtag (Austria-Hungary), but not for the actual legislative assembly, the Imperial Council. However, even this fragmentary and incomplete right to vote was retracted between 1884 and 1904 in the wake of electoral reforms, which prompted renewed efforts by women to gain proper voting rights. In 1892, the Social Democratic Party of Austria included the demand for a general, equal and secret suffrage without distinctions based on gender in its party platform. Yet male party members often provided little support, and women's suffrage was generally deemed a goal of only minor importance.

=== Foundation ===
On 28 January 1893 Ottilie Turnau presided over the inaugural meeting of the Allgemeiner Österreichischer Frauenverein in the Altes Rathaus, Vienna. Auguste Fickert was elected its first president, other important members were Rosa Mayreder as vice-president, Marie Lang and Marianne Hainisch. Irma von Troll-Borostyani was also a co-founder.

=== Early years ===
Although associations were forbidden by law from being politically active, (Note: See section "Background".) individual persons were not, which allowed Auguste Frickert to call public gatherings on political topics. Through statements on contemporary issues such as maternity leave, prostitution, sexuality and women's suffrage, the AÖFV contributed to the politization of women. From the middle of the 1890s, the club campaigned for a reform of marital and family law, and championed the issues of middle-class working women and female civil servants. In 1894, Therese Schlesinger joined and became an important participant.

Between 1893 and 1897 the monthly party paper Das Recht der Frau (The right of the woman) was published with the help of liberal politician Ferdinand Kronawetter and his Voksstimme (The people's voice). In 1899 the association published their own journal, the Dokumente der Frauen (Documents of the women), which put a major focus on the suffragette issue. After a fallout between Fickert and Mayreder and their associate Marie Lang, publication was ceased, and the new magazine became Neues Frauenleben (New lives of women) which was circulated between 1902 and 1918.

=== Cooperation and Conflict ===
In 1902, several Austrian women's associations joined to form the (still extant) umbrella organization Bund Österreichischer Frauenvereine (Federation of Austrian women's associations), and the Allgemeiner Österreichischer Frauenverein became a member. But Auguste Fickert demanded that the AÖFV be represented in the new organization's executive committee, and wrote critical articles for the Neue Frauenleben, in which she accused the BÖFV of being too unpolitical.

Already in 1895, on initiative from Fickert a consulting service called Rechtsschutzstelle had been established in Vienna, which gave (especially poor and unmarried) women pro bono legal advice. Originally this counseling was done in Fickert's private home, but later the city of Vienna allowed the use of an office in a public building; by 1901 the service operated from three separate places, and a year later it had grown so much that it was organized as its own section of the AÖFV.

Also in 1902, the Beamtinnensektion (Section for female civil servants) led by Ida Meyer was founded, which aimed to represent women who – due to their work in civil service – were not included in the "working class" notion of socialist organizations. These included primarily postwomen and later female operators of telegraphs.

Brewing dissent between the AÖFV and the BÖFV escalated when in January 1906 the latter founded a new association in direct competition to the AÖFV's Beamtinnensektion, the Reichsverein der Post- und Telegraphenmanipulantinnen und Posthilfsbeamtinnen (Imperial association of mailwomen and female telegraph operators and auxiliary mailwomen). This prompted the AÖFV to leave the umbrella organization, which in turn resulted in the protest and resignation of 24 members of the Allgemeiner Österreichischer Frauenverein, amongst them Marianne Hainisch. This has been interpreted as a split between a moderate (BÖFV) and radical (AÖFV) wing of Austria's women's movement.

=== Final Years ===
Auguste Fickert died in 1910, and the presidency was left vacant at first, with Mathilde Hanzel-Hübner sharing the vice-presidency with Sofie Regen. Although Jewish women had previously held important positions within the association, in the wake of the First World War, antisemitic discussions ensued related to Leopoldine Kulka (who was opposed to antisemitism) and her wish to succeed Fickert. The war at first halted most suffragette efforts, and it was not until 1916 that women returned to campaigning, and it took another year until women's associations held meetings again. The issue of pacifism was controversial, as pacifist activities were forbidden; but the AÖFV - unlike other women's associations - adhered to its anti-war principles. Already in 1915 Leopoldine Kulka and Olga Misař had participated at the Peace Congress of The Hague, and in 1917 yet another section of the AÖFV was founded called the Friedenspartei (Peace party) led by Elsa Beer-Angerer, which pleaded for an end of the war.

On 12 November 1918, after the collapse of Austria-Hungary, the Republic of German-Austria was proclaimed, which granted active and passive suffrage to all adult citizens regardless of gender. This meant that women's suffrage had finally been achieved in Austria. Possibly as a result, in 1919 the Allgemeiner Österreichischer Frauenverein was dissolved. Still, several members continued their political activities on an international level, for example within the Women's International League for Peace and Freedom.

== Goals ==
The association's primary aim was to enable women to participate in the improvement of the society, which included general welfare, the school system, and demilitarization. The right for women to vote was seen as a means to reach these goals.
