= Neues Frauenleben =

Feminist magazine in Austria (1902–1917)

- Categories: Feminist magazine
- Publisher: General Austrian Women’s Organization
- Founder: Auguste Fickert
- Founded: 1902
- Final issue: 1917
- Country: Austria
- Based in: Vienna
- Language: German

Neues Frauenleben (German: New Women's Life) was a socialist feminist magazine which was published in Vienna, Austria, in the period 1902–1917. It was the official organ of the General Austrian Women’s Organization.

== History and profile ==
Neues Frauenleben was established by Auguste Fickert in 1902 as the successor of Dokumente der Frauen which was also a feminist magazine again founded and co-edited by Fickert. The editor-in-chief of the magazine which had its headquarters in Vienna was also Fickert who held the post until 1910. She was succeeded by Emil Fickert, and Leopoldine Kulka and Christine Touaillon also served as the editor-in-chief.

Neues Frauenleben was a publication of the General Austrian Women’s Organization. Austrian peace activist Rosa Mayreder published articles in the magazine. Some international figures, including Finnish feminist Maikki Friberg, Anna Brunnemann from Sweden, Frederiksen Kristine, Anna Holst, Migerka Elsa, Kohlt Havdan and Bjørnstjerne Bjørnson, also contributed to Neues Frauenleben. Its target audience was working class women. The magazine folded in 1917.
