= Otto Glöckel =

Austrian politician (1874–1935)

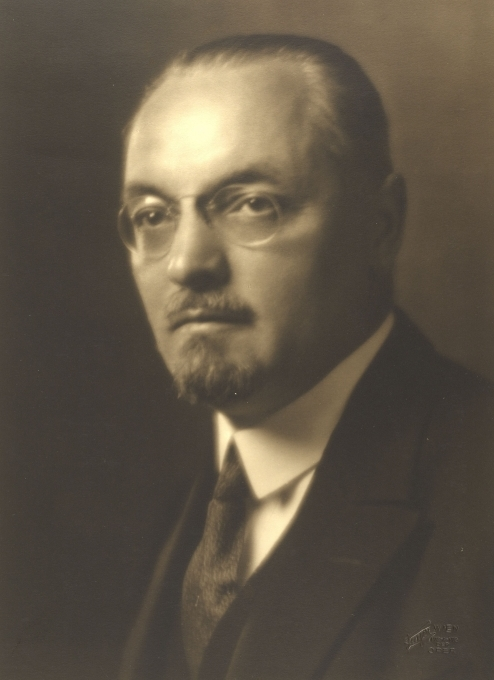
- Glöckel in 1927

President of the Vienna Board of Education
- In office 1922–1934

Undersecretary of State for Education
- In office 15 March 1919 – 24 October 1920

Undersecretary of State for the Interior
- In office 1918–1919

Personal details
- Born: 8 February 1874 Pottendorf, Lower Austria, Austria-Hungary
- Died: 23 July 1935 (aged 61) Vienna, Austria
- Party: Social Democratic Workers' Party of Austria (SDAPÖ)
- Spouse: Leopoldine Pfaffinger (m. 1897)
- Occupation: Teacher, politician

Otto Glöckel (8 February 1874 – 23 July 1935) was an Austrian social democratic politician and school-reformer during the First Austrian Republic.

== Life ==
Otto Glöckel was born in 1874 in the town of Pottendorf, Lower Austria. He trained as a teacher in Wiener Neustadt, graduating in 1892, and subsequently worked as an assistant teacher at primary schools in Vienna's 14th district, Penzing. He joined the Social Democratic Workers' Party of Austria (SDAPÖ) in 1894. Together with Karl Seitz and Paul Speiser, he founded the Viennese teachers' movement Die Jungen ("The Young Ones"). After publicly opposing the discriminatory treatment of assistant teachers, he was dismissed from his post by Mayor Karl Lueger on the grounds of political radicalism.

Glöckel was elected to Vienna's Municipal Council in 1906 and to the Imperial Council in 1907. He served as a member of the Imperial Council, and later of the National Council, until 1934. Within the SDAPÖ, Glöckel became a leading authority on education policy. In January 1917, during the First World War, he outlined an ambitious vision for school and educational reform. His program called for independent schools free from church influence, a unified school system, and free education.

In 1918, Glöckel became a member of the newly established State Council, a collegiate body formed in the final days of the First World War, and was appointed Undersecretary of State for the Interior. This post included responsibility for organising the first elections to the National Council. From 15 March 1919 to 24 October 1920, he served as Undersecretary of State for Education in the Social Democratic–Christian Social coalition government. In this capacity, he promoted school reforms based on liberal principles and abolished compulsory participation in religious instruction. After the coalition collapsed in 1920, Glöckel moved to Vienna to continue his reform efforts on a more limited scale, initially as deputy chair of the District School Board and, from 1922 to 1934, as president of the Vienna Board of Education, during which time he implemented the Viennese School Reform.

After the Austrian Civil War in 1934, in which Glöckel did not take part, he was arrested by the Ständestaat dictatorship and sent to the Wöllersdorf detention camp. He was held there for several months and released shortly before Christmas 1934, following international protests. He died of illness in June 1935. Thousands of mourners attended his funeral at Meidling Cemetery, which also served as an indirect demonstration against the dictatorship. After the Second World War, the City of Vienna resumed educational reforms based on Glöckel's ideas, and during the Kreisky era, many of his approaches were implemented at the federal level.
