= Wiener Demokratischer Frauenverein =

Austrian political women's association

The Wiener Demokratischer Frauenverein (Viennese Democratic Women's Association) was the first political association of women in Austria. It was founded by Karoline von Perin-Gradenstein during the Revolution of 1848, but dissolved immediately after the suppression of the revolution.

Goals of the association were the achievement of equality for women through education, as well as giving humanitarian aid to the victims of the revolutionary fighting. Men were allowed to participate in meetings under certain circumstances, but only women could become full members with voting rights. (Note: This source is originally in German and quoted as such, but is also available in an English translation: https://ghdi.ghi-dc.org/sub_document.cfm?document_id=452&language=english)

After its forced dissolution, its former members were accused of having been "daughter's of joy" (German: Freudenmädchen); an allegation that was known to have been a politically-motivated lie to contemporaries.

== See also ==
Allgemeiner Österreichischer Frauenverein
