= February Patent =

1861 constitution of the Austrian Empire

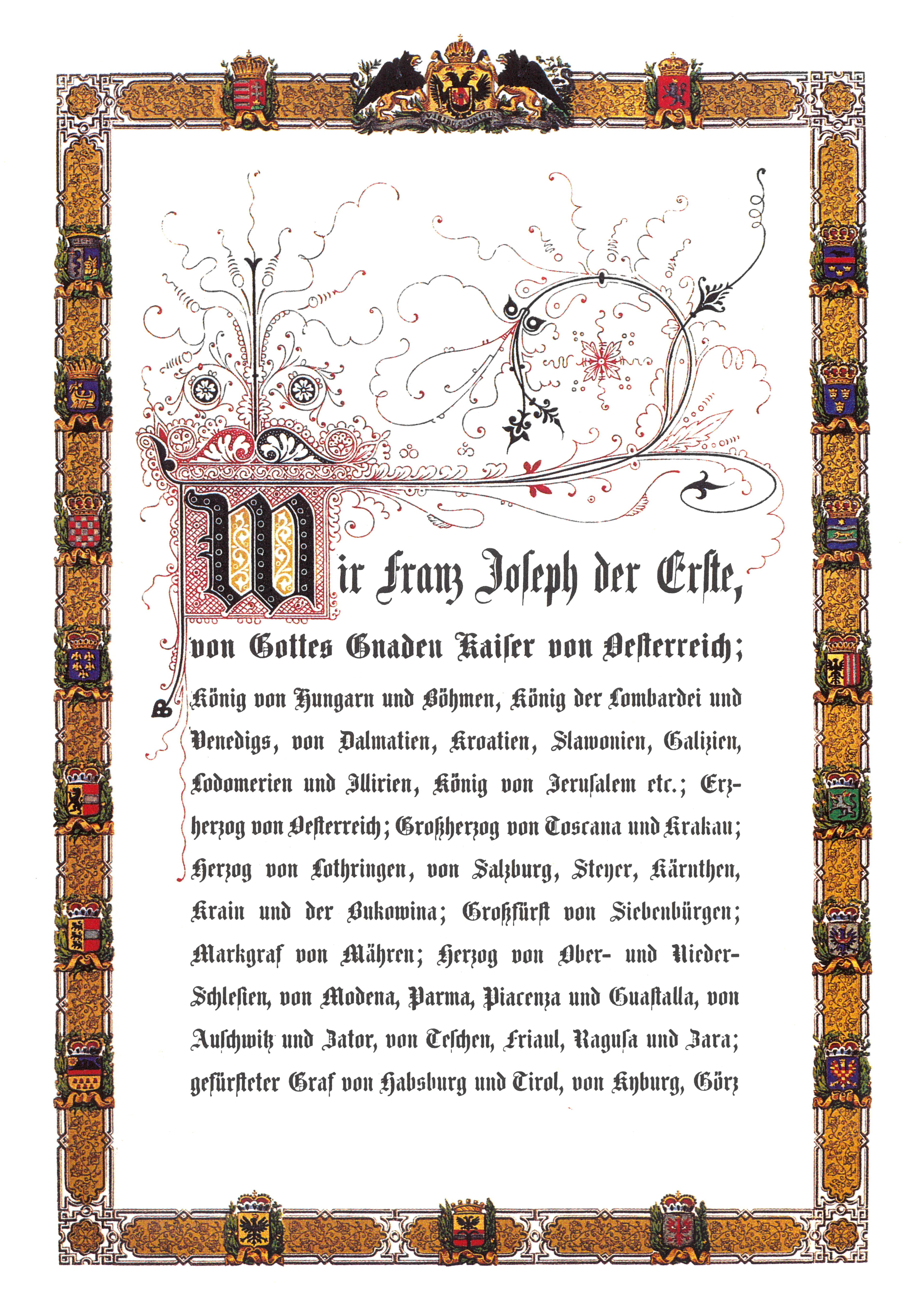
February Patent

The February Patent was a constitution of the Austrian Empire promulgated in the form of letters patent on 26 February 1861.

Franz Joseph I established absolutist rule by issuing the March Constitution (Austria) in 1849. Seeking to borrow money on foreign markets, he relented and issued the February Patent in 1861 which established the Empire's constitution.

== Background ==
In the Austrian Empire, the early 1860s were a period of significant constitutional reforms. The revolutions and wars of the late 1840s-1850s had created a national sense of discontent. The disastrous war in Italy demonstrated openly the weaknesses of the Austrian bureaucracy and army. The burgeoning influence of Prussia and the German Confederation was also a cause for concern. Emperor Francis Joseph I (r.1848-1916) saw that, if he was to maintain his empire, he must begin some reforms. In March 1860, the Emperor began a 'strengthening' of the Reichsrat, the imperial council, by adding new members and giving it advisory powers over major financial and legislative issues, including the formation of a new constitution. The parliament split into two parties, a native German-speaking and a non-German-speaking side. The German side pushed for a stronger central government, but the non-German side (Czechs and Hungarians) pushed for a division of power between the estates. Francis Joseph tried to formulate a compromise in the new constitution, the "October Diploma" (adopted 20 October 1860). The Diploma created a one-hundred-member parliament with extended powers over the empire's finances but no power over the military or legislation. Also, the Parliament did not have power over Hungary, except in matters that affected the entire empire. The Hungarian Diet controlled Hungarian internal affairs.

The new Parliament did not please either side, however. State finances continued to fail; the Germans were not happy with the power given to the diets; and the non-Germans were disappointed by the amount of power that remained in the Emperor's hands. In addition to continuing internal problems, the Austrian Empire was plagued by outside pressures, specifically the evolution of the German Confederation. For centuries, the Habsburgs had been in control of the German states. Even when the German Confederation of States formed in 1815, Austria maintained its influence. With the rise of Prussia in Eastern Europe, that influence was threatened. The Emperor saw the expansion and centralization of Parliament as a way to gain internal strength that would transfer into external power. When Anton Ritter von Schmerling became Secretary of State in late 1860, he took on the task of revising the October Diploma.

== Adoption ==
On 26 February 1861 the February Patent, a letters patent issued by Austrian Emperor Franz Joseph I, was adopted as the "Imperial Constitution of 1861." It was proclaimed as a revision of the previous October Diploma, the "Irrevocable Fundamental Law of the State." The February Patent established in the Austrian Empire a bicameral imperial parliament, still called the Reichsrat, with an upper chamber appointed by the emperor and an indirectly elected lower chamber. The members of the upper chamber were appointed for life and included the crown prince, prominent bishops, heads of noble families, and great citizens. Delegates sent from the diets comprised the 343-member lower chamber, with 120 representatives from Hungary, 20 from Venetia, and 203 from the remaining non-Hungarian estates. The Emperor could check the actions of the lower chamber by appointing more of his supporters to the upper chamber.

The responsibilities of the new Parliament were divided into a 'greater' and a 'lesser' section. In the 'greater' section were matters that affected the empire as a whole, including Hungary. The 'lesser' section was for matters in the estates. Essentially, it superseded the function of the diets in non-Hungarian lands. The Hungarian Diet could function alongside the 'lesser' Parliament if needed. Under the February Patent, the Parliament had more decision-making power than it had before, but it was still completely subject to the Emperor. On the other hand, the Emperor could make political and military decisions without the Parliament's consent and could make any decision he wanted whenever the Parliament was not in session, if it might be an 'emergency.'

The February Patent explicitly excluded women from political participation, and established a census suffrage for men.

The Patent retain the emperor's control over the army and foreign policy. The emperor chose the ministers who were responsible to him. Most ministers were civil servants, not politicians drawn from the bicameral legislature. It has been described as "bureaucratic constitutionalism".

== Suspension ==
The empire's Magyar population refused to cooperate in the new system, resiling from the more liberal changes made in the October Diploma which in fact still wanted to restrain the sovereignty of Hungary. Only German or Romanian delegates from Hungarian lands attended the lower house. This resistance severely undermined the purpose of the Imperial Parliament—to unify the diverse parts of the empire through representation in a central body.

In September 1865, Emperor Francis Joseph suspended the February Patent. The Austrian Germans protested, but the Czechs, Slavs, and Poles were delighted and pressed forward with their autonomous programs. On 17 February 1867, the Constitution of the Kingdom of Hungary was effectively restored, and matters progressed speedily towards the Compromise of 1867. Of its own accord, the Reichsrat added some laws which amended the February Patent, and decided that these laws, the Compromise, and the revised Constitution of Cisleithania, should come into force at the same time as a whole.

== Notes ==
- Austria Karl A. Roider Jr., Encyclopædia Britannica 2006, Encyclopædia Britannica Online accessed 21 Oct. 2006
- "Parliamentarism explained", Republik Österreich Parlament, accessed 21 Oct. 2006 Archived 2007-09-29 at the Wayback Machine
- Okey, Robin, The Habsburg Monarchy c.1765-1918: From Enlightenment to Eclipse. (Palgrave Macmillan: NY) 2001.
- Ingrao, Charles W., The Habsburg Monarchy 1618–1815, 2nd Edition. (Cambridge University Press: NY) 2000.
- "Austria and the Problem of Reform in the German Confederation, 1851-1863", Enno E. Kraehe, The American Historical Review, Vol. 56, No. 2. (Jan., 1951), pp. 276–294.
- Eisenmann, Louis [in German] (1910). "Chapter VII: Austria-Hungary". In Dalberg-Acton, John Emerich Edward; Ward, Adolphus William; Prothero, George Walter; et al. (eds.). The Cambridge Modern History. Vol. 12. Macmillan.
