= Stefanie Nauheimer =

Austrian teacher

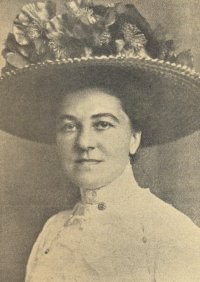
- Stefanie Nauheimer, 1911
- Born: 18 November 1868; Linz
- Died: 29 April 1946 (aged 77); Vienna
- Occupation: Teacher

Stefanie Nauheimer (18 November 1868 – 29 April 1946) was an Austrian feminist and teacher.

== Life and Works ==
Stefanie Nauheimer was born in Linz on 18 November 1868. She graduated from Lehrerbildungsanstalt in Vienna and passed the teaching exam for Volksschulen in 1889.

As a teacher, she committed herself to the equality of female teachers, and worked with Leopoldine Glöckel and Auguste Fickert to overhaul Reichsvolksschulgesetzes 1867, a law governing schools. She also was one of the co-founders of the Vereins der Lehrerinnen und Erzieherinnen, ("Association of Teachers") which developed into the central association of Viennese women teachers. In addition, she was the first woman to be elected to the district council in the elections of 1911.

After World War I, she was the district administrator of the 12th district of Meidling, Vienna from 1919 to 1927. After retiring from teaching in 1920, she was increasingly able to devote herself to the women's movement and the fight for women's equality.

She died in Vienna on 29 April 1946.

In 1952 the "Nauheimergasse" in Meidling, Vienna was named after her. In 2023 "Nauheimerstraße" in Linz was named after her.

== Bibliography ==
- Felix Czeike: Historisches Lexikon Wien vol. 4. Kremayr & Scheriau, Vienna 1995
- "Nauheimer Stefanie". In: Österreichisches Biographisches Lexikon 1815–1950 (ÖBL). Vol. 7, Austrian Academy of Sciences, Vienna 1978, ISBN 3-7001-0187-2, p. 43.
