= Marie Lang =

Austrian feminist, theosophist, publisher

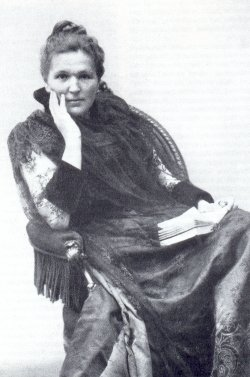
- Lang circa 1885–1899
- Born: Marie Katharina Auguste Friederike Wisgrill; 8 March 1858; Vienna, Austrian Empire
- Died: 14 October 1934 (aged 76); Altmünster, Federal State of Austria
- Other name: Marie Köchert
- Occupations: theosophist; women's rights activist; publisher
- Years active: 1880–1920
- Children: 3; including Erwin
- Relatives: Heinz von Foerster (grandson); Uzzi Förster (grandson); Wenzel Scholz (grand-uncle)

Marie Lang (8 March 1858 – 14 October 1934) was an Austrian feminist, theosophist and publisher. Born in 1858 in Vienna, Lang was raised in a liberal, upper-middle-class home. After divorcing her first husband in 1884, she married Edmund Lang and the two hosted an influential salon for politicians and intellectuals. Joining the women's movement toward the end of the 1880s, she quickly became an influential women's rights activist. In 1893, along with Auguste Fickert and Rosa Mayreder, she founded the Allgemeiner Österreichischer Frauenverein (General Austrian Women's Association). In spite of provisions in Section 30 of the law governing associations, which prohibited women's political involvement, the three friends used their networks of influential politicians and intellectuals to press for legal changes in laws governing women and children's civil rights and in favor of women's suffrage. In 1898, she co-founded the women's journal Dokumente der Frauen (Women's Documents), serving as its editor-in-chief until 1902.

In 1902, Lang attended the International Abolitionist Federation's conference in London and visited the Passmore Edwards Settlement, becoming an advocate of social welfare programs. When she returned to Austria, she gave lectures for the Frauenverein on the settlement movement and organized the Vienna Settlement Society, serving on its board until 1909. In 1901, she founded the Ottakring Settlement House, which served as a place for women to receive social services. Joining the Committee on Woman Suffrage in 1905, she worked actively to change Section 30 and gain women's voting rights. During World War I she worked in a war hospital, performing Swedish massage therapy. Her husband died in 1918 and after two years she retired from work with the Settlement Society to devote time to her family. She is remembered as one of the leading figures in the turn-of-the-century women's movement of Austria. The Settlement Society she founded remained in operation until 2003 and pioneered many social services in Austria, such as adult education, child and maternity care, summer camp programs, and tuberculosis treatment.

== Early life ==
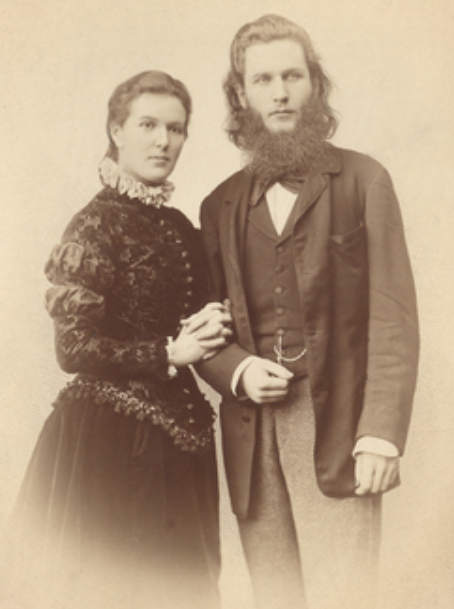
Marie and Theodor Köchert, circa 1880–1884

Marie Katharina Auguste Friederike Wisgrill was born on 8 March 1858 in Vienna, capital of the Austrian Empire, to Emilie (née Scholz) and Karl Wisgrill (also known as Carl Matthias Wissgrill). Her family were part of the small Viennese liberal upper-middle class. Her mother was an actress and the niece of the comedian Wenzel Scholz. Her father was a master carpenter; a proponent of civil liberty, he had supported the Revolutions of 1848. Wisgrill was educated at home by a teacher from the local gymnasium.

In 1880 or 1881 Wisgrill married the court jeweler Theodor Köchert. They had one son, Erich, before separating in 1884. As required by legal conventions of the time, she lost custody of her son by Köchert when they divorced, but mother and son would remain close. During the marriage, she met Edmund Lang, a Jewish lawyer, who was Theodor's brother-in-law, through Heinrich Köchert's marriage to Melanie Lang. In 1885 Wisgrill and Edmund had a son, Heinz, and married soon after. Upon their marriage, Edmund converted to Protestantism. In 1886, the Langs had a second son, Erwin, who would become a painter in later life and marry the dancer Grete Wiesenthal.

== Career ==
The Langs were heavily involved in the salon culture of Vienna, and hosted gatherings of artists and politicians in their home almost every evening. They also summered with a colony of friends in Grinzing at the Schloß Belle Vue, known as the place where Sigmund Freud experienced his dream, Irma's injection. The couple also created a theosophical study group with Friedrich Eckstein and Franz Hartmann. In 1888, they met Rudolf Steiner, a philosopher, and introduced him to theosophical literature, as well as to Lang's friend Rosa Mayreder. The women would both become influential in Steiner's development and he and Mayreder would continue a correspondence for many years. Steiner commented that Lang was the soul of the circle, and that it was her personality and interest in theosophy that encouraged the participation of group members with widely differing views. Her hospitality extended to the composer Hugo Wolf, for whom she cared in her home for many weeks during his illness.

At the end of the 1880s, Lang was introduced to the women's movement by her friends, Auguste Fickert and Mayreder. She quickly became one of the most prominent women's rights activists of her era. In 1891, Lang's daughter Lilith was born, for whom Mayreder would serve as godmother. In 1893, the Allgemeiner Österreichischer Frauenverein (General Austrian Women's Association) was formed by Lang, Fickert, and Mayreder, as one of the radical organizations in the Viennese women's movement. More similar to organizations developed for workers than middle- and upper-class women's groups, which focused on charity, the Frauenverein supported working class rights to employment, education and legal protection for the poor, and the abolition of laws regulating prostitution. In spite of Section 30 of the Vereinsgesetz (the law which specified public rules for private associations), which prohibited women from political participation, Fickert, who led the organization, specifically aimed to influence politics. Using their personal networks and ties with politicians, Fickert, Lang, and Mayreder pressed for changes in the laws on prostitution, for abolition of laws requiring women teachers' celibacy, and encouraging support for women's suffrage. Lang also advocated for legislation to safeguard unwed mothers and their illegitimate children. The Frauenverein became "one of the most influential women's organizations in fin-de-siècle Vienna, changing the face of politics and society for women".

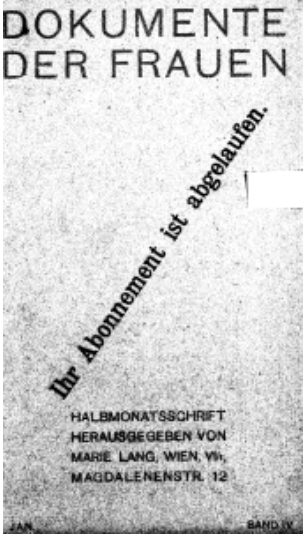
Dokumente der Frauen, 1901

Lang was a supporter of the artists known as the Vienna Secessionists, led by Gustav Klimt. Modernist artists and feminists were typically supported by educated intelligentsia, and though they were not allowed to participate in Secession meetings, feminists saw the links with the artistic movement, as they too contested outmoded values. Lang compared the works of architects like Adolf Loos and Joseph Maria Olbrich; musicians like Gustav Mahler; painters such as Klimt; and set designers like Alfred Roller as expressions of freedom to feminists' rejection of patriarchy.

In 1898, along with Fickert and Mayreder, Lang co-founded Dokumente der Frauen (Women's Documents), as the press organ of the Frauenverein to echo the artistic revolution of the Secessionists. The journal provided a cultural and political forum in which women could express their views on the need for societal change. Lang served as the editor-in-chief, soliciting other writers, while Fickert and Mayreder wrote articles for the journal. In 1899, Fickert and Lang fell out and both she and Mayreder left the publication. Lang continued to publish Dokumente der Frauen until 1902 when funds were no longer available to keep it in production. She also served on the press commission of the Bund Österreichischer Frauenvereine (Federation of Austrian Women's Organizations).

In 1898, Lang was selected as the Frauenverein's delegate at the conference of the International Abolitionist Federation to be held in London. Else Federn asked Lang to study the settlement movement while she was in England. Lang visited the Passmore Edwards Settlement and was impressed with the way the organization was working to solve social problems. By providing self-help training and childcare facilities, which were unheard of at the time, settlement houses provided social services which are now commonplace. When she returned to Austria, she lectured on the settlement movement under the auspices of the Frauenverein. The following year, she began to organize the establishment of the Vienna Settlement Society. Between 1901 and 1909, she served as the vice president of the Settlement Society, under its president, Karl Renner. The first project of the Settlement Society was a school kitchen they operated in Brigittenau, though they were unable to locate a suitable building for housing.

In 1901, Lang founded the Ottakring Settlement House to provide help to working women. She chose Ottakring because it was one of the most populous areas of Vienna and there was a need for alternative housing to the unsanitary tenements in which most workers lived. She hired Secessionist designers Josef Hoffmann, Koloman Moser, and Roller to remodel an old brewery. Federn served as the matron of the facility but was unable to establish communal residential housing as in England. Instead, the Oattkring House served as the first gathering place for social services in Austria which were not funded by charity. Without ties to political or religious affiliations, for a small fee workers could benefit from health care for pregnant women and for children, a nursery for childcare for working mothers, mixed-gender education, classes on cooking, and social evenings with musical performances or lectures.

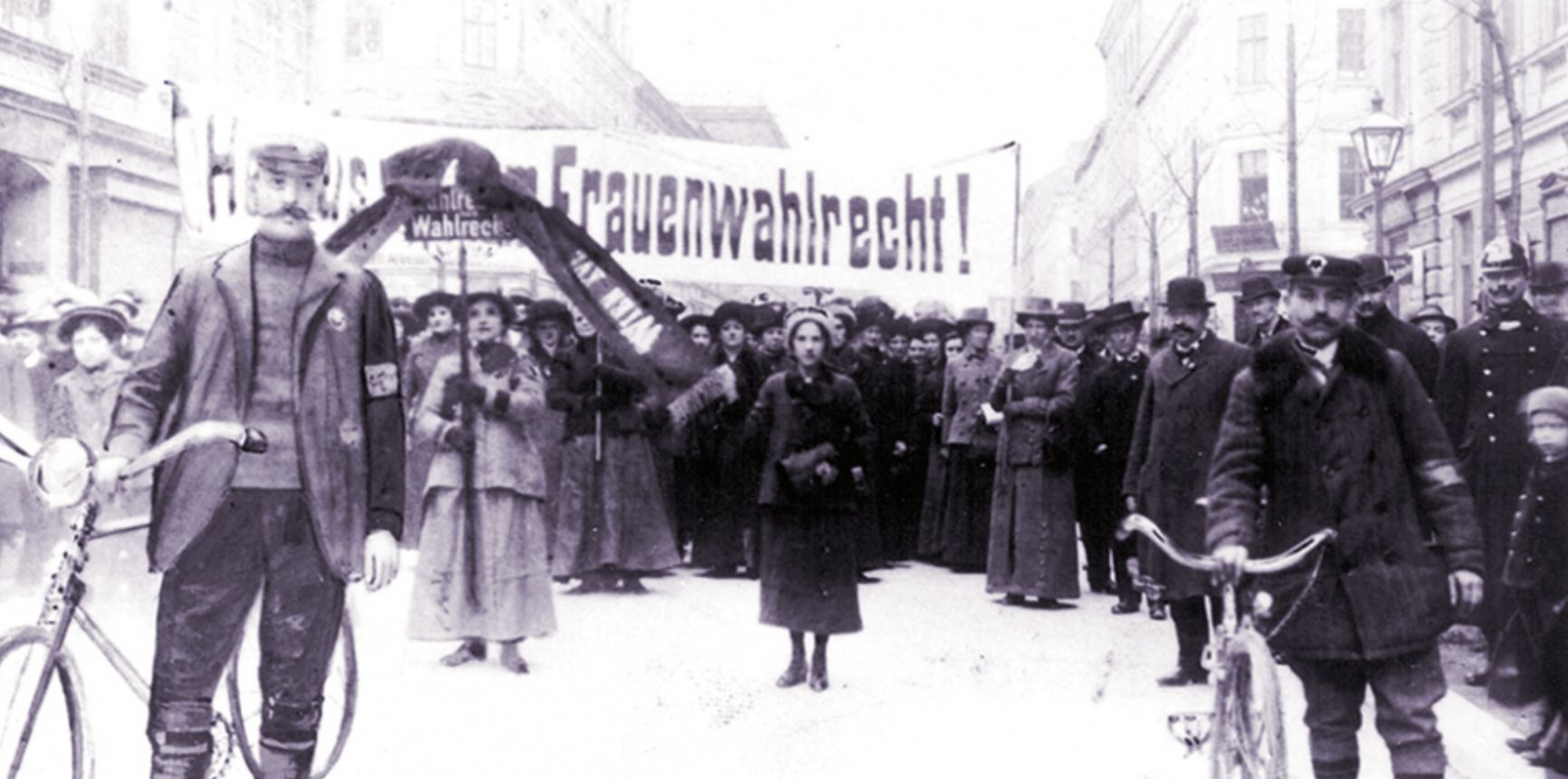
1913 Women's Suffrage demonstration in Ottakring

Lang was appointed to serve on the press committee of the International Council of Women in 1903 and in 1904, attended the Berlin Congress, from which the International Woman Suffrage Alliance was formed. That year, Lang's son Heinz committed suicide after a failed love affair with Lina Loos, wife of Adolf. Arthur Schnitzler wrote a play, Das Wort (The Word) based on the tragic events, which led to Heinz's death. His death had a profound effect on Lang and for a time she lessened her involvement in the women's movement, believing that as she had failed as a mother to protect her own son, she had no right to counsel other women. Heinz fathered a son, Karl Friedrich "Peter" (1904–1947), who was posthumously born to Ida Oberndorfer. Lang took the child in and raised him.

In 1905, the Committee on Woman Suffrage (German: Österreichisches Frauenstimmrechtskommittee) was founded. They presented petitions to both houses of Parliament that same year and in 1907 submitted a petition with 4,000 signatures to abolish the law banning women's political organizations. Lang represented the Committee as Austria's delegate to the 1908 International Woman Suffrage Alliance 4th congress held in Amsterdam and gave a report on their activities. During World War I, Lang worked in the military hospital set up in the Akademisches Gymnasium, performing Swedish massage therapy. She also conducted numerous private consultations to assist women in finding help and support. Edmund died on 6 April 1918, and later that year, on 12 November, women gained the franchise in Austria. For two years Lang continued to be active working at the Oattkring House and then retired to devote her time to her family.

== Death and legacy ==
Lang died on 14 October 1934 in Altmünster, where she was living on Lake Traunsee with her oldest son Erich Köchert. She is remembered as one of the leading figures in the turn-of-the-century women's movement of Austria. The Vienna Settlement Society, which she founded, pioneered adult education, child and maternity care, summer camp programs, and tuberculosis treatment in Austria and operated until 2003, though many of its original programs became government services. In 2012, Marie-Lang-Weg (Marie Lang Way) was dedicated to her in Blaustein, Germany, and in 2016 a street bearing the same name in the Floridsdorf district of Vienna, near the Gaswerk Leopoldau (Leopoldau Gas Works), was named in her honor.

Lang's daughter, Lilith married Emil von Förster, son of the architect Emil Ritter von Förster. The couple's sons Heinz von Foerster became a noted physicist in the United States and Uzzi Förster was a musician who introduced jazz to Austria. Lilith left her family papers, which are protected by the Federal Monuments Office, to the Wiener Privatbesitz (Viennese Private Collection).
