= Erwin Lang =

Austrian painter

Erwin Lang (22 July 1886 – 10 February 1962) was an Austrian painter. His work was part of the painting event in the art competition at the 1928 Summer Olympics. On December 14th, 2007, Erwin Lang's oil on canvas painting The Dancer Grete Weisenthal With Her Son and Sister was sold at auction in New York via Christie's for $51,400.

== Life ==
Erwin Lang was born in Vienna, the son of the social worker and women's rights activist Marie Lang, and studied at the Vienna School of Arts and Crafts under Alfred Roller. He exhibited his works for the first time in 1908 at the Vienna Art Show. In 1911 Lang exhibited with Kokoschka and Schiele in an exhibition of the Hagenbund, of which he was a member. Another of his main areas was woodcuts.
