= Irena Kosmowska =

Polish educator and politician

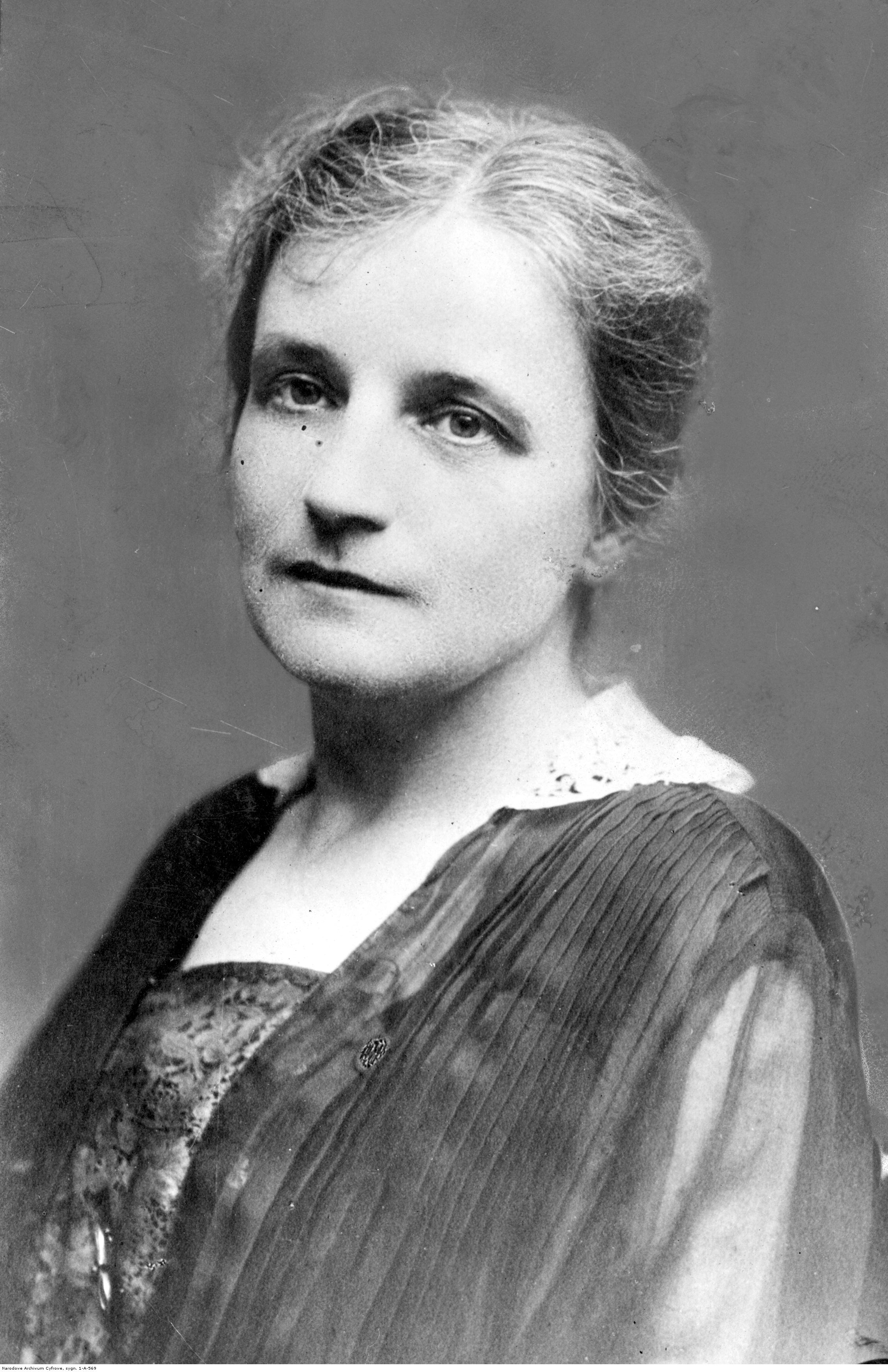

Member of the Legislative Sejm
- In office 1919–1922
- Constituency: Lublin

Member of the Sejm
- In office 1922–1930

Personal details
- Born: 20 December 1879 Warsaw, Russian Empire
- Died: 21 August 1945 (aged 65) Berlin, Germany

Irena Kosmowska (20 December 1879 – 21 August 1945) was a Polish educator and politician. She was one of the first group of women elected to the Legislative Sejm in 1919, serving in parliament until 1930.

== Biography ==
Kosmowska was born into an intellectual family in Warsaw in 1879, the daughter of Irena (née Kozłowska) and Wiktoryn. After being home educated, she attended a boarding school in the city and then a school for landowners' daughters in Kuźnice in 1898. After returning to Warsaw, in 1903 she began she lecturing at courses for village security guards which were led by Jadwiga Dziubińska and Maria Wehyro. From 1905 to 1908 she studied Polish history and literature at the University of Lviv, where she met activists of the Galician People's Movement, including Maria and Bolesław Wysłouch, under whose influence she began her political activity.

In 1908 she started contributing to the weekly Zaranie under the pseudonym Jasiek z Lipnicy, subsequently co-editing the publication from 1905 to 1915. From 1911, she also edited the "Świt - Młodzi idą" supplement, in which she published works by young folk poets. She was a co-organiser and secretary general of the Agricultural Society of S. Staszica and helped found a school for girls in Krasienin in 1913. Before World War I, she was involved in setting up agricultural schools in Kruszynek, Gołotczyzna, Sokołówek and Bratno. Together with Dziubińska, she developed the curriculum of the first folk schools, modelled on Danish folk schools and Czech agricultural schools.

Prior to the war, Kosmowska was associated with the pro-independence left and represented Ruch Zaraniarski in the Temporary Commission of Confederated Independence Parties. During 1914 she co-edited a supplement to Zarania, which supported the anti-Russian irredentist movement Na naszej ziemi. After the outbreak of the war, she participated in the work of the Union of Independence Organisations, the League of Polish Women of the Polish Military Service and the Polish Military Organisation. However, she was arrested in May 1915 and was deported to Russia in July. After spending time in Taganka Prison, she was released on bail and lived in Saint Petersburg, where she became involved with the Polish Society for Aid to War Victims, organising educational courses for refugees.

After returning to Poland in 1918, she joined the Polish People's Party "Wyzwolenie" (PSL Wyzwolenie), and in November was appointed Deputy Minister of Social Welfare in the Provisional People's Government led by Ignacy Daszyński. The following year she became a member of the central committee of the party and was one of eight women elected to the Legislative Sejm. She was re-elected in 1922 and 1928, remaining in parliament and on the central committee of her party until 1930. During her time in parliament she was also a member of the Inter-Parliamentary Union. In 1930 she was sentenced to six months in prison for anti-Piłsudski activities. She became a member of the People's Party in 1931 after PSL "Wyzwolenie merged into the new party and was a member of its supreme council from 1931 to 1939. She also edited the party's newspaper Zielony Sztandar. In 1938 she was awarded the Cross of Independence.

During World War II Kosmowska was a member of the People's Party "Roch" underground movement. In July 1942 she was arrested by Gestapo; initially imprisoned in Pawiak, she was moved another jail in Berlin, where she died in August 1945 due to wounds suffered during a bombing raid several months before. In 1961 she was buried in the Powązki Military Cemetery. She was posthumously awarded with the Order of the Cross of Grunwald.
