= Irma von Troll-Borostyani =

Austrian writer, journalist and campaigner for women's rights

Irma Troll-Borostyáni
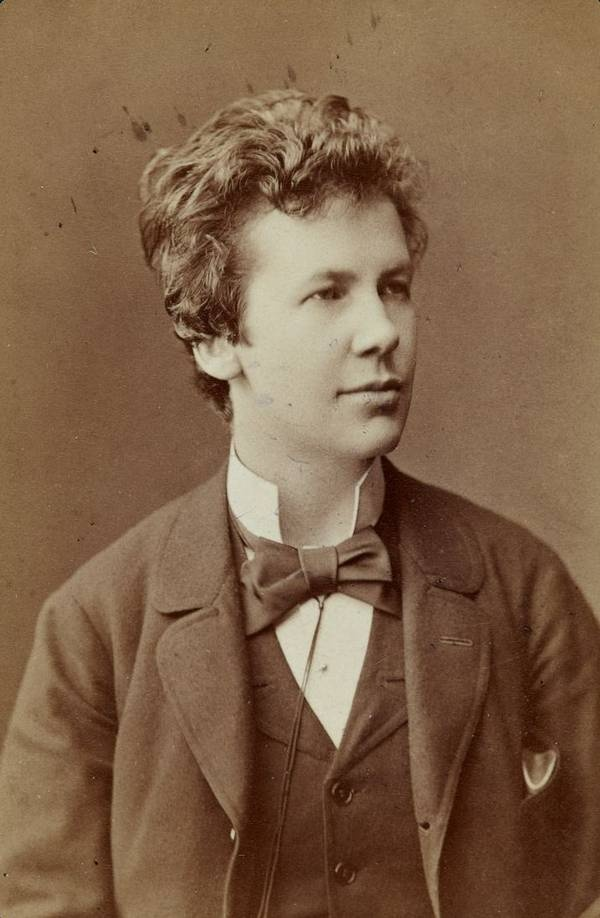
- Born: Maria von Troll; 31 March 1847; Salzburg
- Died: 10 February 1912 (aged 64); Salzburg
- Other names: Leo Bergen; Veritas; Irma Troll; Maria Troll

Irma Troll-Borostyáni (31 March 1847 – 10 February 1912) was an Austrian writer, journalist and campaigner for women's rights.

== Biography ==
Troll-Borostyáni was born in Salzburg as Maria von Troll to Josephine von Appeltauer and Otto Ritter von Troll on 31 March 1847. She loved music which her mother taught her, and wanted to be a pianist. From 1862 to 1864 Troll-Borostyáni attended the Benedictine Abbey at Nonnberg. However she became ill after two years and returned home where she cut off her hair and later changed her name from Maria to Irma. Mostly she taught herself and her notebooks detail what she learned. In 1864 her sister Wilhelmine became a teacher in Hungary and in 1866 their father died leaving the family with limited funds. This reduced her career path options, typically to being a governess or getting married.

In 1870 Troll-Borostyáni moved to Vienna with the intention of becoming a concert pianist. While there she came in contact with the literary circles and took acting classes. She was unable to make her career in Vienna and followed her sister to Hungary where she became a music teacher. There, in 1874 she married Hungarian journalist and writer Ferdinand von Borostyáni. However, though the marriage produced a daughter, they did not continue to live together. Her husband moved to Paris, and later still Budapest, but Troll-Borostyáni did not go with him. Her health was poor especially after the birth of her daughter. She and her husband maintained a long distance friendship. She increasingly wrote, her focus almost entirely on the campaign for gender equality and women's rights. When her daughter and mother both died, Troll-Borostyáni moved back to Salzburg. There she lived in a house with her sister Wilhelmine and Helene, Maria, and Johanna Baumgartner.

Troll-Borostyáni wrote the political pieces she is now known for as well as plays, short stories, essays and novels. During the 1890s Troll-Borostyáni regularly wrote essays and articles for newspapers and magazines. She became known as a significant voice in the campaign for women's rights. In 1893 Troll-Borostyáni co-founded of the General Austrian Women's Association.

Troll-Borostyáni wrote under a number of names throughout her life. These included Leo Bergen and Veritas as well as the variations on her own names. She kept her hair short and usually wore shirts with a stand-up collar and stitch, jackets, trousers and smoked cigars. Troll-Borostyáni campaigned for freedom from corsets and for trousers to be seen as women's clothing. Before her ill health, she was a keen swimmer, ice skater and mountaineer. Troll-Borostyáni died in Salzburg after a stroke and was buried in the family plot. She is remembered by the Troll Borostyáni Prize, awarded by Salzburg since 1995, as well as a street which is named after her.

Rosa Mayreder wrote her obituary which concluded

“With her one of the most outstanding champions from the old school of the women's movement passed away. But in the history of this movement she has a permanent monument and continues to work through her works."

== Bibliography ==
- Die Mission unseres Jahrhunderts – eine Studie über Frauenfragen (1878)
- Gleichstellung der Geschlechter (1888)
- Die Prostitution vor dem Gesetz – ein Appell an das deutsche Volk und seine Vertreter (1893)
- Das Weib und seine Kleidung (1897)
- Verbrechen der Liebe (1900)
- So erziehen wir unsere Kinder zu Vollmenschen (1912).

=== Novels ===
- Aus der Tiefe (1892)
- Onkel Clemens (1897)
- Irrwege (1908)
