= Herbert Furth =

American economist

Josef Herbert Furth (J. Herbert Furth; October 12, 1899, in Vienna, Austria – March 6, 1995, in Chevy Chase, Maryland, United States) was an Austrian and American jurist and economist.

He was the son of Ernestine von Fürth, née "Kisch", the founder and leader of the women's suffrage movement in Austria and Emil von Fürth (1863 - 1911), an Austrian lawyer and politician.

In 1938, after Austria's annexation to Nazi Germany Furth and his mother emigrated to the United States.

== Career ==
Professor of Economics, Lincoln University, Lincoln, PA, 1939–1943; Lecturer at Catholic University, Washington, D.C, 1945–1950; Adjunct Professor (Lecturer) at The American University, Washington, D.C. 1950–1966; Visiting professor, International University of Luxembourg, 1960; Lecturer at the Foreign Service Institute, 1966–1974.

He served with the Federal Reserve Board as economic specialist (1943–1967), Chief of the Eastern European and Near Eastern Section (1948–1952), Chief of the Western European and Commonwealth Section (1952–1956), Chief of the International Financial Operations Section (1956–1957), Associate Adviser (1957–1960), Adviser and Associate Economist to the Federal Open Market Committee (1961–1964), Consultant (1964–1967).
