= Ida Chagall =

Daughter of Marc Chagall

Ida Chagall (1916 – 1994), also known as Ida Meyer, was the daughter of the renowned Russian-French artist Marc Chagall.

== Early life ==
Ida was born on May 18, 1916, in Vitebsk, Russia, artist Marc Chagall's first child and the only child with his first wife Bella Rosenfeld (1895-1944). Bella was a Yiddish writer and a source of inspiration for her husband. The Russian Revolution had a profound impact on the entire family, including Ida.

== Paris years ==
In 1923, the Chagall family moved to Paris where Ida continued her education among some of the most influential artists of her time. In 1935, Ida Chagall married her first husband, Berlin-born Michel Gordey, (1913-2005), a journalist and lawyer by training.

== Nazi era ==
During the Nazi occupation of France in the Second World War, Ida Chagall and her husband Michel joined the French Resistance. After her father had managed to flee the Nazis in 1942 with the assistance of the American, Ida, who had been unable to obtain a visa, saved her father's paintings by smuggling them out of Europe.

Ida's mother Bella died suddenly in 1944 in New York.

== Family ==
She and her second husband, Franz Meyer, had a son, Piet, and twin girls, Bella and Meret. Meyer was a former museum director of the Kunstmuseum in Basel, in Switzerland.

== Post-war period and legacy ==
After the war, Ida Chagall organized exhibitions, wrote extensively about his art and played a crucial role in the founding of the Chagall Museum in Nice, France.

Ida promoted her father's art and she ensured that many of his paintings were preserved during the turmoil of World War II. Her daughters are also immersed in art.

== Philanthropy ==
In 1990 she donated 103 artworks by her father to Israel Museum in Jerusalem.

Ida Chagall died on 10 August 1994 in Brulat du Castellet in southern France at the age of 78.
