= Karoline von Perin-Gradenstein =

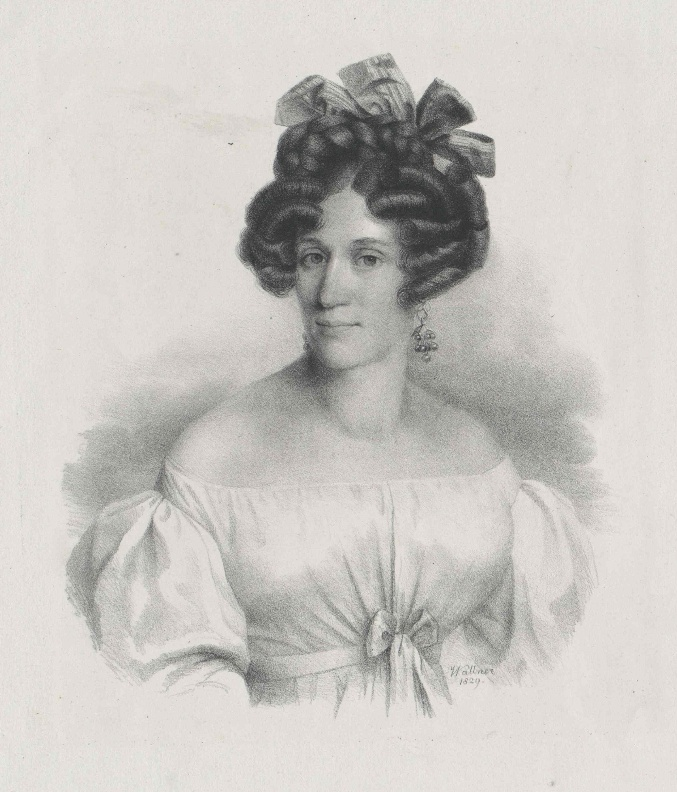
- Born: 16 February 1806; Vienna, Austrian Empire
- Died: 10 December 1888 (aged 82)
- Occupations: Revolutionary and suffragette
- Spouse: Christian Freiherr von Perin-Gradenstein

Karoline von Perin-Gradenstein, née von Pasqualati (12 February 1806 – 10 December 1888), was an Austrian revolutionary and suffragette.

== Life ==
Karoline von Perin-Gradenstein was born in Vienna, capital of the Austrian Empire, on 12 February 1806 to a well-to-do family. She married Christian Freiherr von Perin-Gradenstein in 1830 and they had four children together, only three of which reached adulthood, before his death in 1841. A few years later, she hired the composer and journalist Alfred Julius Becher to teach piano for her daughter Marie and they later became lovers.

During the early stages of the Austrian Revolution of 1848, von Perin-Gradenstein supported Becher's newspaper The Radical (German: Der Radikal) and agitated for women's rights. She later became president of the Viennese Democratic Women's Association (German: Wiener demokratische Frauenverein) which supported equal rights for men and women while also providing medical care to those wounded during the Revolution. Its members attended the funerals of those killed during the riots in August when workers and students fought the conservative National Guard (German: Nationalgarde). When the government's troops crushed the revolutionaries during the Vienna uprising in October 1848, von Perin-Gradenstein was arrested and Becher was executed on 23 November. She suffered abuse in prison and was released 23 days later, and then emigrated to Munich, capital of the Kingdom of Bavaria, on 17 April 1849 once she had permission to leave the country. She returned to Vienna after she had partially renounced her activities during the Vienna Uprising in her memoirs, Unpublished memoirs (German: Ungedruckte Aufzeichnungen), and started an employment agency to support herself. She took no further part in political activities and died on 10 December 1888.
