= Peri-Khan Sofiyeva =

First Muslim woman to be elected in the world

Peri-Khan Sofieva
- Pərixan Sofiyeva
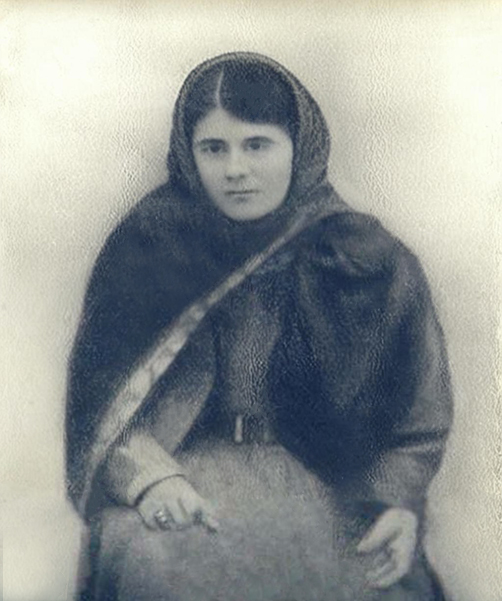

Personal details
- Born: 1884 Karajala, Tiflis Governorate, Russian Empire
- Died: 1953 (aged 68–69) Karajala, Georgia SSR, Soviet Union
- Party: Independent

Peri-Khan Sofieva (Azerbaijani: Pərixan Sofiyeva, Georgian: ფერიხან სოფიევა; 1884 – 1953) was the first Muslim woman elected to office.

== Biography ==
Sofiyeva was born in 1884 in the Georgian town of Karajala, then part of the Georgian region of Tiflis Governorate, in the Russian Empire. She was the only girl in a family of eight. At the time of the Russian Empire, Sofia was the head of her brothers, thus gaining popularity. With the loan taken from a bank, she opened an orphanage in the village.

== Political career ==
=== Independent Georgia ===
After the February 1917 Revolution, the transition from the South Caucasus began with a reform of the local governments. On 26 May 1918, Georgia declared its independence. In local elections later in the year, Sofiyeva was elected to be a councillor in Karajala. Although Sofiyeva was an active person, very little is known about her life.

=== Invasion of the Soviet Union ===
According to Rashgan Sofieva, the wife of Peri-Khan Sofieva's nephew, Sofiyeva hated the Bolsheviks and the Soviet government. Because of the Great Purge, she walked around with her old Mauser C96 pistol, after eight brothers were executed and buried in one of the common graves because they came from a rich family and were considered traitors.

=== Death ===
Sofiyeva died in 1953, victim of a heart attack after hearing of the detention of one of her nephews.
