= Auguste Fickert =

Austrian feminist and social reformer

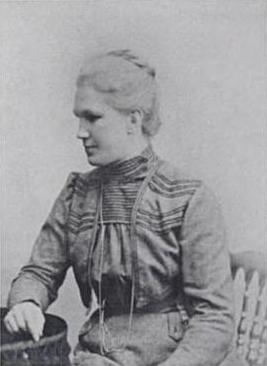
- Auguste Fickert, pre 1905
- Born: 25 May 1855; Vienna, Austrian Empire
- Died: 9 June 1910 (aged 55); Maria Enzersdorf, Austria
- Other name: "Gusti"
- Occupation: Teacher
- Known for: Feminist activism

Auguste Fickert (born 25 May 1855, Vienna – died 9 June 1910, Maria Enzersdorf, Austria) was a pioneering Austrian feminist and social reformer. Her politics were on the left wing of Austrian feminism and she allied with proletarian organizations in campaigns around education and legal protection for working-class women.

== Life ==
Fickert was the daughter of Wilhelm Fickert, a Viennese court printer, and his wife Louise. She had a sister, Marianne, and two brothers, Emil and Willy. She attended the Englisher Fraulein convent school from 1869 and then the Lehrerinnen- Bildungsanstalt St Anna, a teacher training college, from which she graduated with honours in 1876.

She began to teach that same year at a girls' school in the Schulegasse of Vienna. Fickert was a teacher for all her professional life. She left the Catholic Church in 1893 and publicly criticized the religious basis of school instruction in Austria at that time. As a result, she endured vitriolic attacks by the clerical (and anti-Semitic) Christian Social Party which continued throughout her life.

Her first public political act was to organize a petition against the disfranchisement of women voters in government elections in Lower Austria which followed a political reorganization in the region in 1889. She collected over 1000 signatures from women protesting at their loss of the right to vote granted in 1862. Nevertheless, the measure went ahead. This began her career as campaigner for universal women's suffrage in Austria. She was also active in campaigns to unionize women civil servants and for better treatment of prostitutes.

She worked with Stefanie Nauheimer and Leopoldine Glöckel to overhaul Reichsvolksschulgesetzes 1867, a law governing schools.

Auguste Fickert co-founded the Allgemeiner Österreichischer Frauenverein (General Austrian Women's Association) in 1893. This organization campaigned for the improvement of proletarian women's lives. It was the most radical of the feminist organizations in Austria at that time. She was editor of its publications, the Dokumente der Frauen (Documents of Women) and Neues Frauenleben (New Woman's Life). In 1897 she became the organization's director. She worked closely with a friend Marie Lang but a falling-out and public argument caused her to relinquish her roles in the papers to Lang. Her intransigent nature contributed to this failure to work jointly with other women. Thereafter she was an inspirational figurehead to the women's movement in Austria. In 1902 Fickert started a magazine which she called Neues Frauenleben with Leopoldine Kulka as its editor. Kulka was a historian of literature and the first woman lecturer at the University of Vienna.

Her close companion and friend through her adult life was Ida Baumann, also a teacher, who shared her early steps into political action and remained close to her all her life. Baumann avoided the limelight and did not achieve the fame of Fickert. At the end of her life, Fickert was involved with the Einküchenhaus (one-kitchen house), a housing cooperative for professional women.

In 1910, aged 55, Fickert suffered internal pain attributed to organ failure and died on 9 June at a sanatorium in Maria Ensedorf, Lower Austria. She is buried in the Neustift am Walde cemetery in Vienna.

== Honors ==
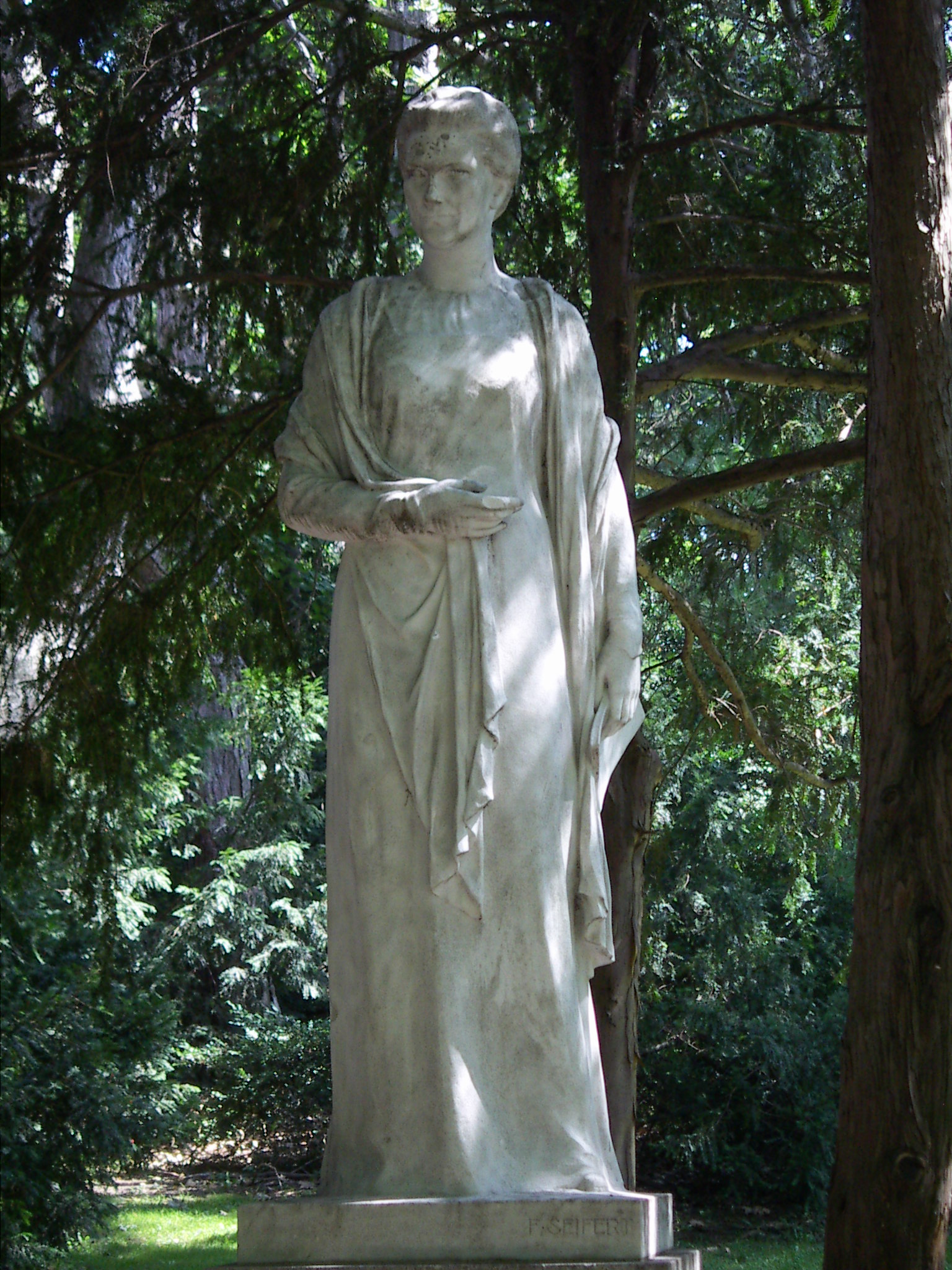
Statue to Fickert in the Türkenschanzpark, Vienna

In 1929, the sculptor Franz Seifert created a memorial to her. This is now located at the Türkenschanzpark in Währing, Vienna and this includes the inscription: "Full of courage and energy she sacrificed her life to high ideals."

The Fickertgasse, a street in Vienna, was named after her in 1926.

== Bibliography ==
- Weiner Stadt- und Landesbibliothek, Handschiftensammlung, August Flickert: Manuscripts including her diary 1871/72-1910 (124 pp.) and c. 2000 unpublished letters.
- Flich, Renate. “Der Fall Auguste Flickert-eine Lehrerin macht Schlagzeilen” (The case of Auguste Flickert- A woman teacher makes the headlines). Wiener Geschichtsblatter 45, no. 1 (1990): 1-24.
- Hacker, Hanna. “Wer gewinnt? Wer verliert? Wer tritt aus dem Schatten? Machtkampfe und Beziehungsstrukturen nach dem Tod der ‘groben Feministin’ August Fickert (1910)” (Who will win? Who will lose? Who steps out of the shadow? Power struggles and relations after the death of the ‘great feminist’ Auguste Fickert, 1910). L’Homme-Zeitschrift fur Feministische Geschichtwsissenschaft 7, no. 1 (1996): 97-106.
- Anderson, Harriet. Utopian Feminism. Women’s Movements in fin-de-siecle Vienna. New Haven-London: Yale University Press, 1992.
- Hacker, Hanna. “Zeremonien der Verdrängung: Konfliktmuster in der bürgerlichen Frauenbewegung um 1900” (Ceremonies of suppression: conflict patterns in the bourgeois women’s movement about 1900). In Lisa Fischer and Emil Brix, eds. Die Frauen der Wiener Modern (The women of Viennese modernism). Vienne-Munich: Verlag fur Geschichte und Politik und Oldenbourg Verlag, 1977, 101-109.
