= Ernestine von Fürth =

- Born: Ernestine Kisch; October 5, 1877; Prague, Austria
- Died: March 6, 1986 (aged 98); Washington, D.C.
- Occupations: Editor, Suffragist
- Spouse: Emil von Fürth

Ernestine von Fürth, née Kisch (5 October 1877, Prague – 31 October 1946, Washington, D.C.) was an Austrian-Jewish women's activist, a founding member of the "Neuen Wiener Frauenklub" (New Vienna Women's Club), chairwoman of the Austrian women's suffrage committee, and editor for the "Zeitschrift für Frauenstimmrecht" (Journal for Women's Suffrage) in Austria.

== Life ==
Although she was an important activist in Austrian history, relatively little is known about Ernestine von Fürth's private life. Born Ernestine Kisch to a wealthy Prague family, she married the court lawyer Emil von Fürth, who was at that time a member of the Viennese Sozialpolitische Partei (Social-Political Party). Both converted from Judaism in 1905. in 1906, Ernestine von Fürth founded the Austrian women's suffrage committee alongside Leopoldine Glöckel. The establishment of a legal women's suffrage association was not initially possible because the law prohibited women from membership in legal associations. In March 1912, Fürth was also a leading participant in the convening of the first Austrian women's suffrage conference in Vienna, which was intended to unite the Cisleithanien women's suffrage associations under one umbrella organization.

Her son was the lawyer and economist Herbert Furth, a member of the same circle as Ludwig von Mises and Friedrich August von Hayek. The mother and son fled together to the United States in 1938 to avoid persecution under the rise of National Socialism and the Nazi regime.

Ernestine von Fürth died on 31 October 1946, in Washington D.C.

== Literature ==
- Elisabeth Malleier, Jüdische Frauen in der Wiener bürgerlichen Frauenbewegung 1890–1938. 2001, especially p. 59–65.
- Margarete Grandner, Edith Saurer, Geschlecht, Religion und Engagement: Die jüdischen Frauenbewegungen im deutschsprachigen Raum (19. und frühes 20. Jahrhundert). Böhlau Verlag, Vienna 2005, ISBN 3205772598.
