= Leopoldine Glöckel =

Austrian politician (1871–1937)

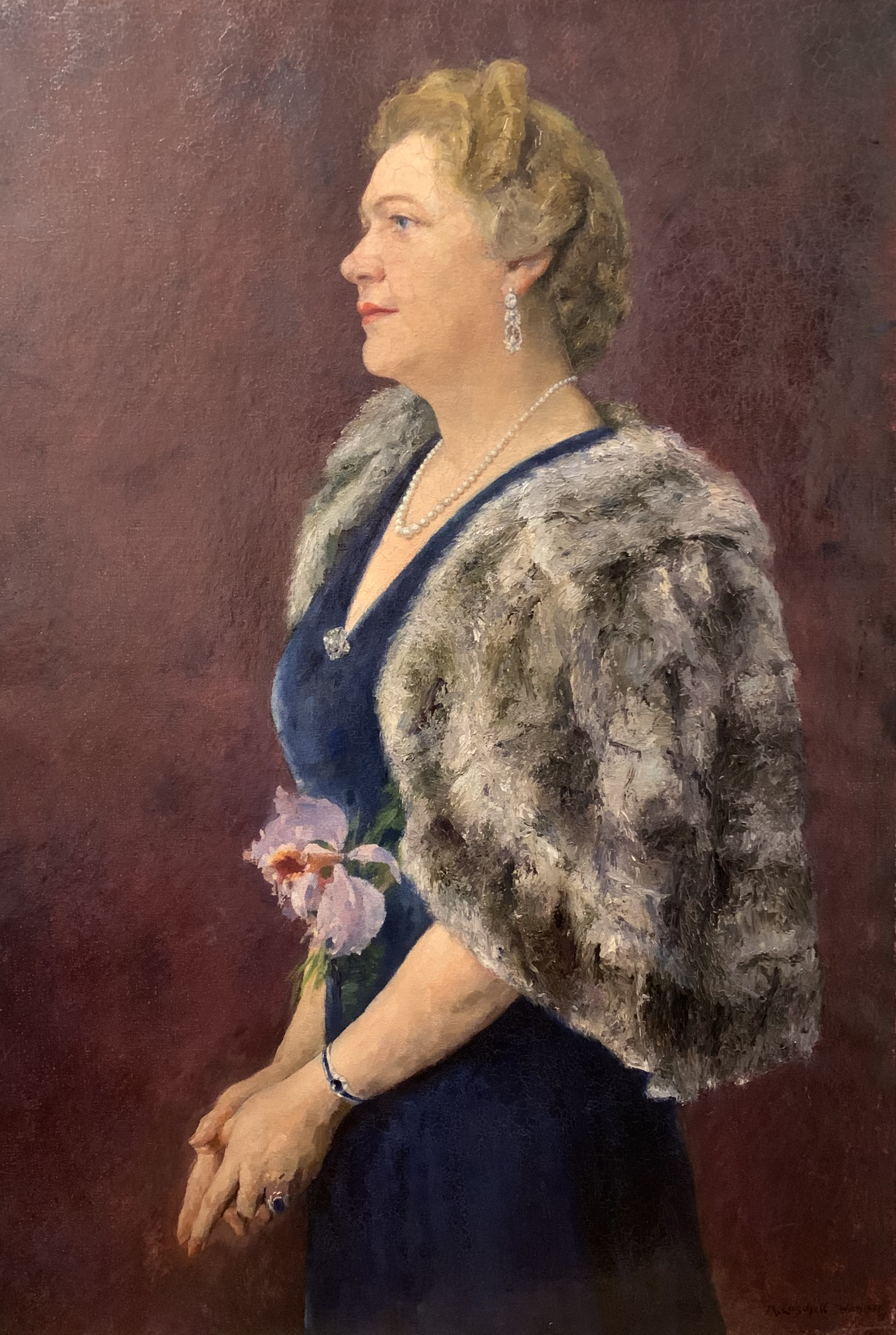

Member of the City Council of Vienna
- In office 22 May 1919 – 12 February 1934

Personal details
- Born: Leopoldine Pfaffinger; 12 November 1871 Vienna, Austria-Hungary
- Died: 22 May 1937 (aged 65) Vienna, Austria
- Party: Social Democratic Party
- Spouse: Otto Glöckel (m. 1897; died 1935)
- Occupation: Politician

Leopoldine Glöckel (12 November 1871 – 21 May 1937) was an Austrian politician. She was one of the first women to become a member of the City Council of Vienna. She was chairwoman of the City Council Committee for Welfare Institutions, Youth Welfare and Health Care. She married Otto Glöckel in 1897.

== Biography ==
Leopoldine Glöckel, née Pfaffinger, was born the daughter of the director of the telephone and telegraph administration in Vienna, Joseph von Pfaffinger. After the early death of her mother, she grew up with her wealthy grandparents. She attended eight-year elementary school, then received private lessons and finally graduated from the teacher training college. From 1893 to 1934 she worked as a needlework and vocational school teacher in Vienna. In 1897 she married the social democrat, teacher and educational reformer Otto Glöckel.

Leopoldine Glöckel was initially active in the "General Austrian Women's Association" and thus in the environment of the bourgeois women's movement, where she founded a women's suffrage committee together with Ernestine Fürth in 1905. From 1897 onwards, however, she publicly represented positions that were closer to social democratic ideas, for which she was also attacked as a "bourgeois teacher". When Karl Lueger dismissed Otto Glöckel, whom she had married in the same year (1897), from teaching because of his political activities, Leopoldine Glöckel was also transferred to imprisonment as a punishment.

Initially committed to non-partisan work, Leopoldine Glöckel increasingly turned to the Social Democratic Workers' Party. She became a member of the party's central women's committee and was a member of the Vienna Women's Committee. Around 1901 she appeared as a speaker in the social democratic reading and discussion club "Libertas". Leopoldine Glöckel was considered an excellent speaker who gave numerous lectures on the topics of education and schools. She was a founding member of the "Free School" association, in whose institutions she also taught. In her home district of Meidling she was a member of the district board, chairwoman of the district women's organization and member of the district welfare association. She served as vice president of the private welfare association "Societas" and as chairwoman of the school committee in the training school for domestic helpers that she founded. She enthusiastically supported her husband's school reform and published specialist articles about it in the Arbeiterinnen-Zeitung and its successor Die Frau.

She worked with Stefanie Nauheimer and Auguste Fickert to overhaul Reichsvolksschulgesetzes 1867, a law governing schools.

Leopoldine Glöckel ran for the Social Democratic Workers' Party in the 7th district from 1919. She was a member of the City Council of Vienna for four legislative periods, from May 22, 1919 to February 12, 1934, and from 1920 also of the Vienna State Parliament. During this time she was chairwoman of the City Council Committee for Welfare Institutions, Youth Welfare and Health Care. In the first three election periods she also worked as secretary in the City Council and Vienna State Parliament. In May 1927 she became deputy chairman of the newly constituted Social Democrats' Club in the Vienna City Council. Leopoldine Glöckel was one of the first female City Council members.

After the dissolution of the local council and the ban on the Social Democratic Workers' Party in February 1934, Leopoldine Glöckel was taken into police custody from February 12 to March 30, 1934. After that, she continued to be involved in the party's underground activities; the training school for domestic helpers was a center of the illegal organization during this time.

After the death of her husband in 1935, she lived a "completely withdrawn" life until her death.

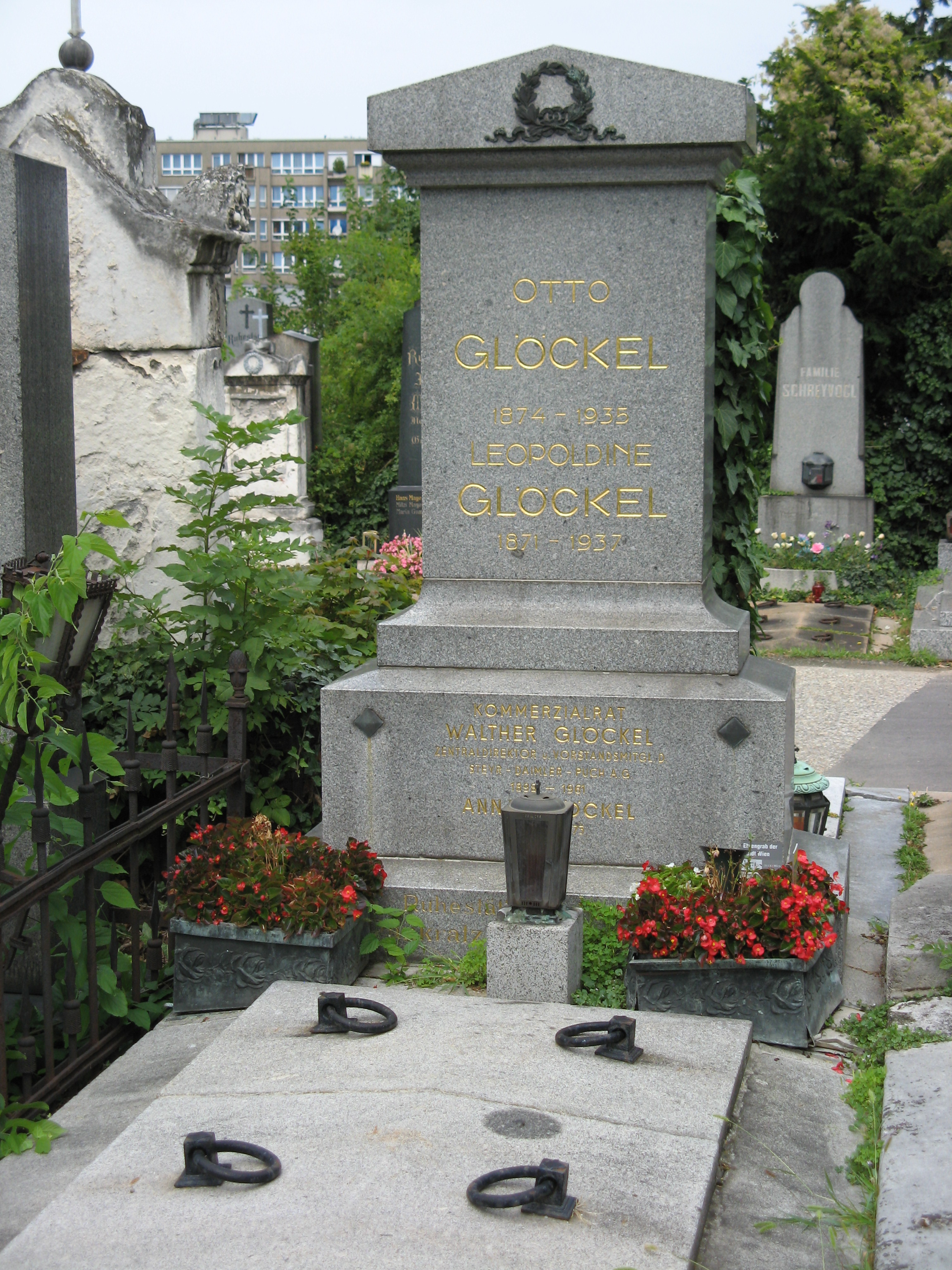
Grave of Leopoldine and her husband

According to the post-mortem report, Leopoldine Glöckel died on May 22, 1937 in Vienna (in the literature, May 21, 1937 is also given as the date of death). Both the cremation - at which Karl Seitz gave a eulogy - and the burial of the urn in the Meidling cemetery took place with great public participation. She was buried in the grave in honor of her husband in the Meidling cemetery.

In the 12th district, the municipal residential complex Leopoldine-Glöckel-Hof and Leopoldine-Glöckel-Weg were named after the politician.
