= Jadwiga Dziubińska =

Polish politician (1874–1937)

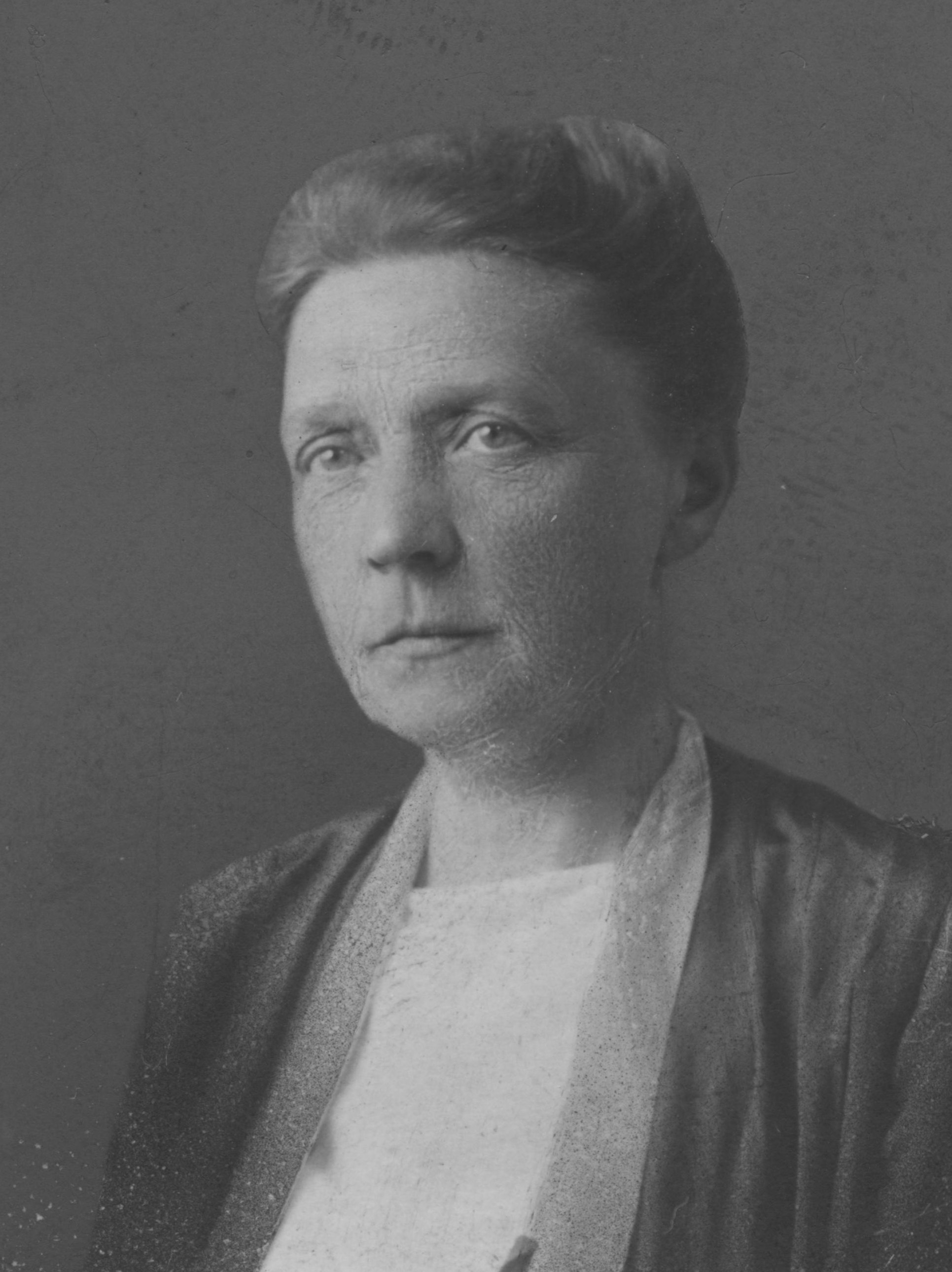
Jadwiga Dziubińska

Jadwiga Dziubińska (Polish: [jadˈviɡa d͡ʑuˈbijska]; born 10 October 1874 in Warsaw, died 28 January 1937), was a Polish politician. She was among the first women elected to the Polish Sejm after Polish independence in 1918.
