= Hildegard Burjan =

Austrian politician (1883-1933)

Blessed Hildegard Burjan
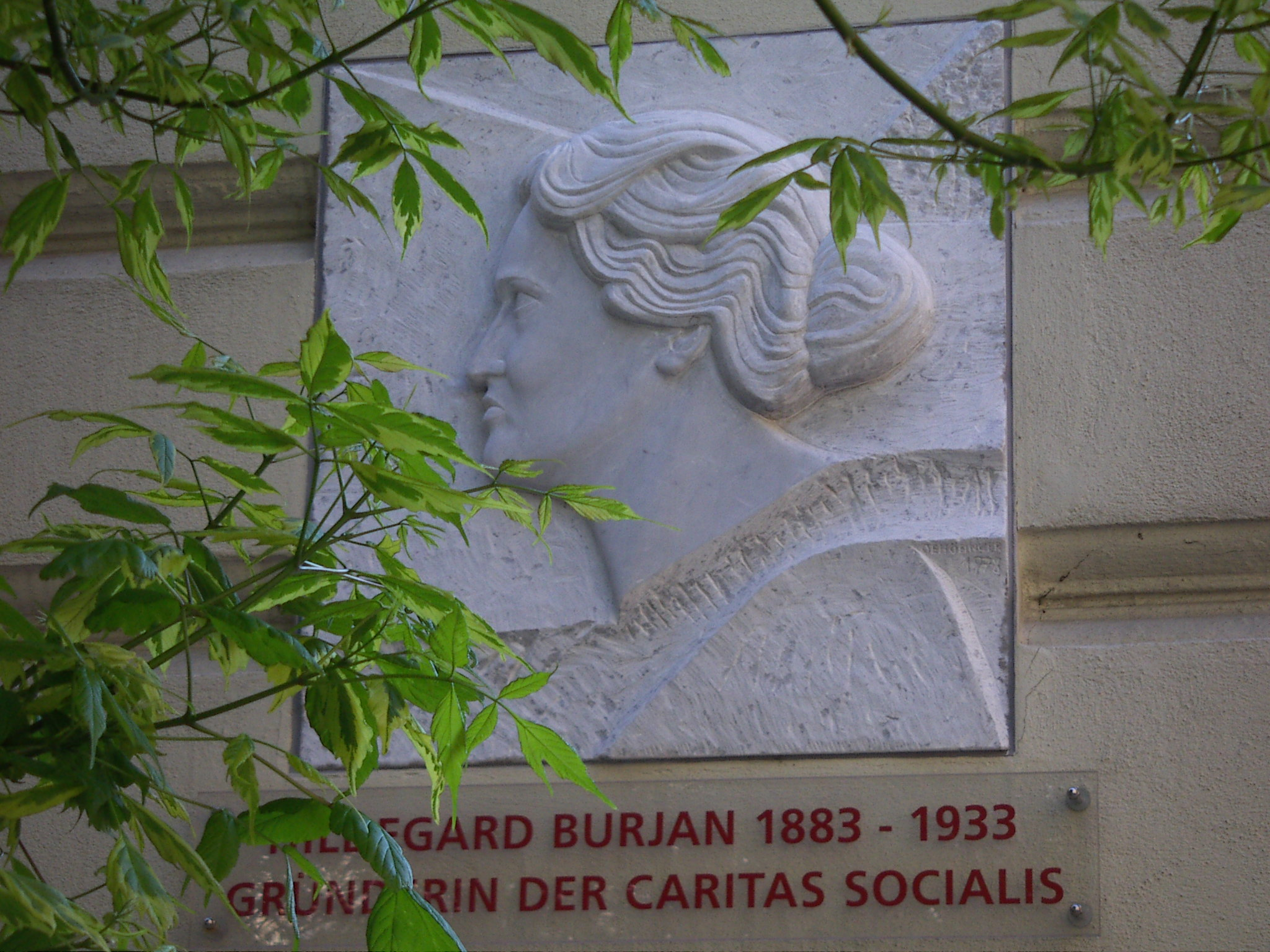
- Relief plate for Hildegard Burjan in Vienna, inscripted with "Founder of the Caritas Socialis"
- Born: 30 January 1883; Görlitz, Province of Silesia, Kingdom of Prussia, German Empire
- Died: 11 June 1933 (aged 50); Vienna, First Austrian Republic
- Venerated in: Roman Catholic Church
- Beatified: 29 January 2012, Saint Stephen's Cathedral, Vienna, Austria by Cardinal Angelo Amato
- Feast: 12 June

Hildegard Lea Burjan (née Hildegard Freund; 30 January 1883 – 11 June 1933) was an Austrian social politician and convert from Judaism to the Roman Catholic Church. She founded the Sisterhood of Caritas Socialis. Burjan set up several organizations for the promotion of women's rights and for the rights of all workers and their families and this even saw her elected to the Austrian Parliament where she served until her retirement due to ill health.

A beatification process for Hildegard Burjan commenced under Pope John Paul II in 1982. Pope Benedict XVI beatified her in 2012; Cardinal Angelo Amato presided over the celebration on the pope's behalf.

== Life ==
Hildegard Freund was born to non-practicing Jewish parents in the German Empire in 1883 as the second-born to Abraham and Berta Freund.

The Freunds relocated to Berlin in 1895, where she was sent to high school and the Freunds relocated once more in 1899 to Switzerland where she studied in Zurich at the college there. Freund graduated from high school in 1903 after the completion of her examinations and then began her college studies. Freund studied German literature as well as philosophical and sociological studies under the two Protestant professors Saitschik and Foerster in Switzerland, and then in Berlin, when she returned in 1907 to also start an economics course; she obtained a doctorate in 1908. On 2 May 1907 she married the Hungarian entrepreneur Alexander Burjan (26 November 1882 - 6 November 1973).

In October 1908 she suffered from severe renal colic that forced her hospitalization on 9 October at the Saint Hedwig Catholic Hospital in Berlin where she underwent several operations. Just before Easter 1909, the condition got to the point where doctors gave up all hope but she was healed from this grave illness after Easter on 12 April 1909. It was during her hospitalization that she came to admire the work of the Sisters of Saint Charles Borromeo. This illness prompted her conversion to the Roman Catholic Church; she was baptized on 11 August 1909 and her husband followed in August 1910. Burjan moved with her husband to the Austrian capital of Vienna, where she bore her sole daughter Lisa on 27 August 1910 despite possible risk, as past pregnancies had threatened her life. The doctors advised her to have an abortion, but she refused and exclaimed: "That would be murder!" Burjan soon started to take interest in the social issues of the nation and took a particular interest in the working conditions and spiritual welfare of the poor.

In September 1912 she gave an address at the annual gathering of women's leagues, and in 1912 founded the "Christian Women Working at Home" and in 1918 the group dubbed "Social Help". The former group offered social protection and better wages as well as legal assistance. Her social activism was also due to inspiration she received from the late Pope Leo XIII's 1881 Rerum Novarum on social teachings and conditions. On 16 April 1914 she gave another talk at another such annual gathering and discussed the topic of women's rights and the importance of women in the workplace. During World War I she defended the idea of women replacing men in factories and hailed the trend even after the war. The prelate Ignaz Seipel said that he had never met a more enthusiastic or wise politician as Burjan while Cardinal Friedrich Gustav Piffl dubbed her as "the conscience of the Parliament". On 3 December 1918 she earned a seat on the district council and became the vice-chair to the chairman of the Christian Socials Leopold Kunschak.

Her main achievement remains the founding of a religious congregation for serving the poor, and on 4 October 1919 founded the congregation titled the "Sisterhood of Caritas Socialis". The first ten women joined that October at a special mass. In 1918 she became active in the Christian-Socials, and in 1919 became one of the first female members of the Austrian Parliament; she spoke in the Parliament for the first time on 12 March 1919 and at one point filed a petition for the extension of legal rights of expectant and nursing mothers. Burjan concerned herself with issues such as equal wages for men and women and social protection for the working class as well as social and spiritual care for poor families. Burjan was invited to run in the 1920 elections and was proposed as the Minister for Social Affairs but declined due to poor health; she informed the executive committee for the Christian Socials that she would not re-contest but retire instead.

On Pentecost in 1933, she suffered a severe and painful renal inflammation. Burjan died on 11 June 1933. The ailing woman murmured on her deathbed: "how beautiful it will be to go to rest in God!" and then kissed a Crucifix and spoke her final words: "Dear Savior - make all men lovable so that You might love them. Enrich them with Yourself alone!" The order that she founded received diocesan approval in 1936 and then papal approval from Pope John XXIII in 1960. Her remains were later moved in 2005.

== Beatification ==
The official start to the cause came on 7 January 1982 under Pope John Paul II, after the Congregation for the Causes of Saints issued the nihil obstat ("nothing against") to it. Pope Benedict XVI confirmed that Burjan had lived a life of heroic virtue and named her as venerable on 6 July 2007. The pope approved a miracle which was attributed to Burjan's intercession on 27 June 2011 and delegated Cardinal Angelo Amato to preside over the beatification in Vienna in his name on 29 January 2012. The postulator for this cause is Dr. Andrea Ambrosi.

On 11 June 2015 a memorial was revealed and blessed at a special Mass held by Auxiliary Bishop Helmut Krätzl and Archbishop Peter Zurbriggen at Saint Stephen's Cathedral.

== Literature ==
- Irmgard Burjan-Domanig: Hildegard Burjan, eine Frau der sozialen Tat. 3rd ed. Caritas Socialis, Vienna, 1976
- Hanna-Barbara Gerl-Falkovitz: Mystik, Emanzipation und Politik: Hildegard Burjan (1883–1933). Caritas Socialis, Vienna, 2004
- Alfred Koblbauer: Spiritualität. 2nd vol.: Hildegard Burjan. Missionsdruckerei St. Gabriel, Mödling, 1976
- Michaela Kronthaler: Hildegard Burjan (1883–1933). Katholische Arbeiterinnenführerin und christliche Sozialpolitikerin. Dr.-Karl-Kummer-Institut für Sozialpolitik und Sozialreform in Steiermark, Graz, 1995
- Michaela Kronthaler: Die Frauenfrage als treibende Kraft: Hildegard Burjans innovative Rolle im Sozialkatholizismus und Politischen Katholizismus vom Ende der Monarchie bis zur 'Selbstausschaltung' des Parlaments (in: Grazer Beiträge zur Theologiegeschichte und Kirchlichen Zeitgeschichte, Bd. 8). Verlag Styria, Graz-Vienna-Cologne, 1995, ISBN 3-222-12358-6
- Ingeborg Schödl (ed.): Hoffnung hat einen Namen. Hildegard Burjan und die Caritas Socialis. Tyrolia, Innsbruck-Vienna, 1995, ISBN 3-7022-1980-3
