= Anna Boschek =

Austrian politician (1874–1957)

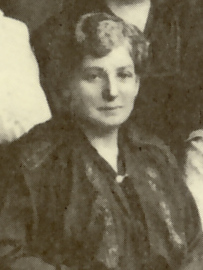
Anna Boschek

Anna Boschek (14 May 1874, Vienna – 18 November 1957) was an Austrian politician (Social Democrat) and feminist. She was one of the first women in the Austrian parliament.

Boschek was the daughter of a railway locksmith. Orphaned at a young age, she was forced to quit school and worked as a domestic and at various factories. She was the ward of Anton Hueber, who also became her political mentor. In 1890, she became the first woman in the Social Democratic Party of Austria's central committee. At the time, women were prohibited from engaging in political activity, so she took her seat on the committee under an assumed, male, name.

In 1891, Boschek she became a member of the workers' union and the Social democratic ABF. She was one of three women delegates at the 1893 conference which founded the Imperial Trade Union Commission, and in 1894, she was elected to its executive, with responsibility for women workers. She remained the most prominent woman in the Austrian trade union movement until the end of World War I. During these years, she founded trade unions for nurses, domestic servants, tobacco workers, and flower and feather workers. In 1900, she founded the Union of Sewers, a trade union open to all women able to sew. This broad definition allowed it to act as a general union for women, while circumventing government restrictions on women's political groups.

From 1918 to 1920, Boschek was a member of the Vienna city council. In 1919–1920, she was a member of the Austrian Constitutional Assembly election, 1919, then she was a member of the National Council of Austria from 1920 to 1934. After the coup of 1934, she was imprisoned for seven weeks and then put under police surveillance.
