= Maria Tusch =

Austrian politician (1868–1939)

Member of the National Council
- In office 1920–1930; 1930–1934

Member of the Constituent National Assembly
- In office 1919–1920

Personal details
- Born: 1 December 1868 Klagenfurt, Austria-Hungary
- Died: 25 July 1939 (aged 70) Klagenfurt, Austria

Maria Tusch (1 December 1868 – 25 July 1939) was an Austrian trade unionist and politician. In 1919 she was one of eight women elected to the Constituent Assembly, becoming the country's first female parliamentarians. She remained in parliament until 1934, when she was arrested and imprisoned following the Austrian Civil War.

== Biography ==
Tusch was born Maria Pirtsch in Klagenfurt in 1868, the daughter of an unmarried maid. At the age of 12 she began working in a tobacco factory, where she became involved in trade unionism, eventually becoming a shop steward and then a member of the works council. This led her to enter politics and she rose to become chair of the women's committee of the Carinthia branch of the Social Democratic Party (SdP). She also sat on the municipal committee of Sankt Ruprecht, a suburb of Klagenfurt, She married Anton Tusch, a railway worker and fellow SdP member. The couple adopted a daughter.

Tusch was a SdP candidate in the 1919 Constituent Assembly elections and was one of eight women elected, becoming Austria's first female parliamentarians. She was re-elected in 1920, 1923, 1927 and 1930. During her time in parliament she focused on women's rights, World War I veterans and abortion rights.

She died of pneumonia in 1939.
