= Gabriele Proft =

Austrian politician (1879–1971)

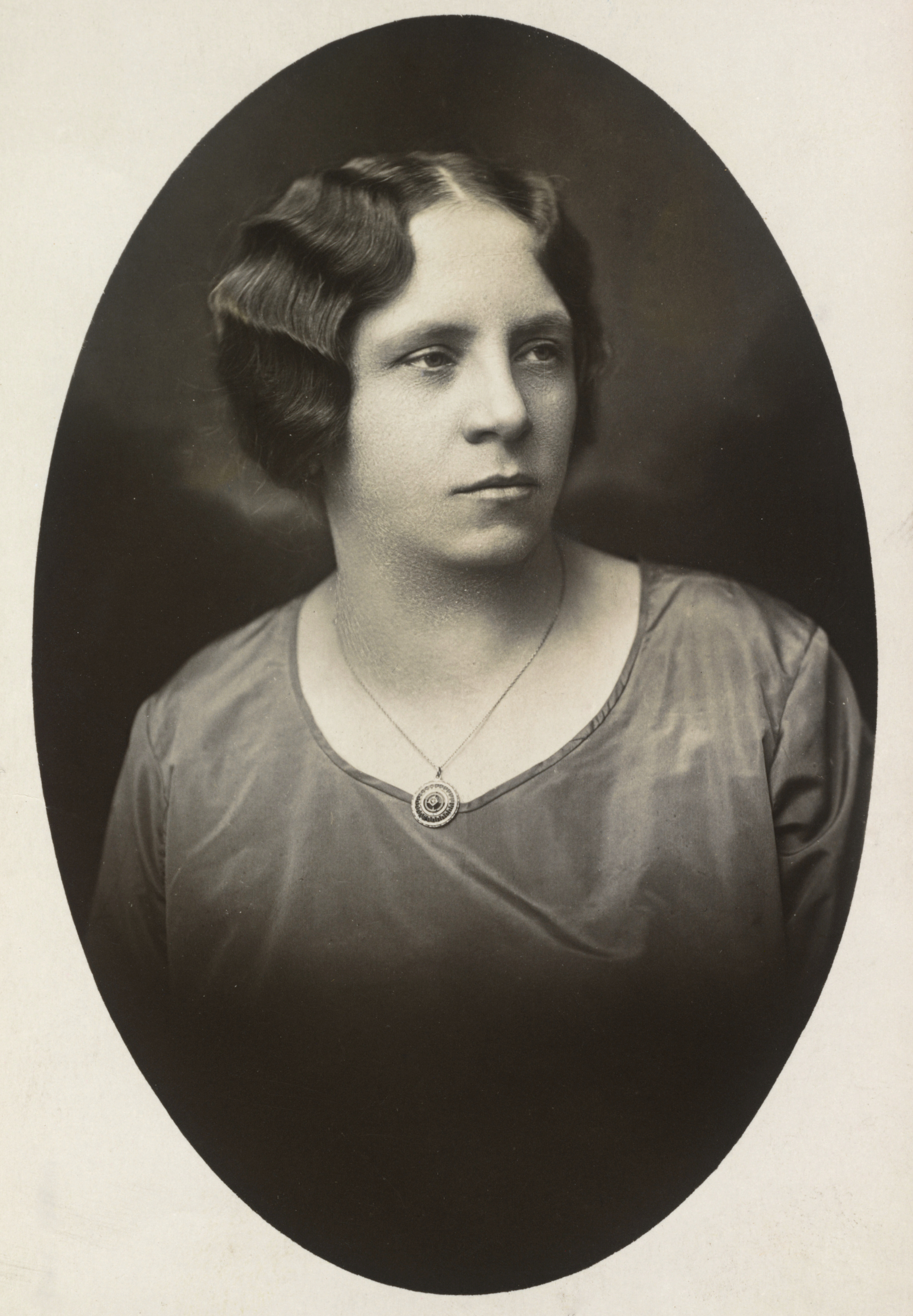
- Proft in 1929

Member of the National Council
- In office 1920–1930; 1930–1934; 1945–1953

Member of the Constituent National Assembly
- In office 1919–1920

Personal details
- Born: 20 February 1879 Troppau, Austria-Hungary
- Died: 6 April 1971 (aged 92) Bad Ischl, Austria

Gabriele Proft (20 February 1879 – 6 April 1971) was an Austrian journalist, writer and politician. In 1919 she was one of eight women elected to the Constituent Assembly, becoming the country's first female parliamentarians. She remained in parliament until 1934, when she was arrested and imprisoned following the Austrian Civil War. After World War II she was elected to parliament again, serving until 1953.

== Biography ==
Proft was born in Troppau, Austria-Hungary (now Opava, Czech Republic) in 1879. She moved to Vienna aged 17, initially working as a housemaid. She became a journalist and writer. She also became involved in politics, becoming central secretary of the Social Democratic Party (SdP) women's organisation in 1909.

She briefly served as a member of Vienna City Council in 1918. The following year she was a SdP candidate in the Constituent Assembly elections and was one of eight women elected, becoming Austria's first female parliamentarians. She was re-elected in 1920, 1923, 1927 and 1930. Following the Austrian Civil War in 1934, she was imprisoned. She was later jailed again from 1944 to 1945.

After World War II Proft became deputy leader of the Social Democratic Party and chair of its women's section. She contested the November 1945 elections and returned to the National Council. She was re-elected in 1949, serving until the 1953 elections. She remained deputy leader of the party and chair of the women's section until 1959.
