= Maria Emhart =

Austrian resistance activist and politician (1901–1981)

- Born: Maria Raps; 27 May 1901; Pyhra (Sankt Pölten), Lower Austria, Austro-Hungarian empire
- Died: 9 October 1981; Bischofshofen, Salzburg, Austria
- Occupations: Factory worker Political and union actist Resistance activist Municipal politician and deputy-mayor Regional politician National politician and member of parliament
- Political party: SPÖ
- Spouse: Karl Emhart
- Children: no
- Parent(s): Johann Raps; Maria Kreutzer

Maria Emhart (born Maria Raps: 27 May 1901 – 9 October 1981) was an Austrian resistance activist who survived the Hitler years and, in 1953, became a national politician (SPÖ).

== Life ==
=== Provenance and early years ===
Maria Emhart was born in Pyhra, a small town on the edge of Sankt Pölten and a short distance to the west of Vienna. She was the first-born of her parents' five children. Johann Raps, her father was a railwayman. He drank. Maria Kreutzer her mother, aged just 17 at the time of Maria's birth, was a farm worker. When she was three months old her parents married one another. During her childhood the family lived in a two-room apartment in a social housing development ("Barackensiedlung") in Sankt Pölten. There was never enough to eat. The children went without shoes between April and October each year, and at nights slept two to a bed.

=== Factory work ===
Money was short, and when she was 14 she had to leave school and take a factory job at the Sankt Pölten Glanzstoff [shiny textiles] factory. When she attended the interview for her first job, part of the interview process involved weighing her. She was slightly built and undernourished, and the personnel officer had to send her away with an apology, explaining that she did not even match the minimum weight for a trainee. However, a family friend familiar with the factory knew that the personnel officer was due to retire shortly. She therefore returned for another interview with his successor a few weeks later, having first taken the precaution of discretely sewing some stones into the hem of her dress. This time she passed the weight test and was offered the job she badly needed. By this time war had broken out. Business was good and the factory was working three 8 hour shifts each day. Every third week the fourteen year old Maria Raps worked the night shifts. With male factory workers having been conscripted for military service she was often required to undertake heavy work which in more normal times would have been reserved for the men. By 1917 poor working conditions in the local factories were combining with wild rumours about a workers' state in Russia and of strikes in Berlin and Vienna to feeding into political radicalisation. Neither of Maria's parents had ever found much time for politics: she nevertheless became one of many who turned to trades union activism in the aftermath of the First World War. At 17 she joined the Social Democratic Party: the move would shape the rest of her life. The next year she found that she was pregnant. The father of her baby would have been Karl Emhart, a rail worker like her father. In 1918, however, by selling a revolver and her watch she was able to afford a train ticket to Vienna where she underwent an illegal abortion. She would later attribute her failure to become pregnant following her marriage to that procedure.

=== Marriage ===
In 1921 Maria Raps married Karl Emhart. The marriage, though childless, was happy. The couple remained together till Karl Emhart's death in 1965, irrespective of the legal divorce that they were forced to go through in 1936 in order that Emhart might avoid losing his job after Maria's political activism (in what after 1934 had become a one-party state) had earned her an eighteen-month prison sentence.

=== Politics ===
She embarked on a role of political leadership as an elected member of the Works council at the factory where she worked. She took every opportunity to press for an improvement in the working conditions of the co-workers who had elected her to the position. Between 1920 and 1932 the registered population of Sankt Pölten grew from 23,000 to 37,000 in 1932, supported by a rapid expansion of manufacturing. Conditions in the factories improved through the 1920s, partly as a result of pressure from organised labour, but the economic backdrop remained uncertain. Acutely conscious that she was handicapped by having had to leave school at such a young age, Maria Emhart travelled by train to nearby Vienna twice a week in order to attend classes at the Workers' Academy ("Arbeiterhochschule") in the city. The college was run jointly by the SPÖ and the Austrian Trades Union Congress. Although general education featured on the curriculum, there was also a focus on political ideas, enabling Emhart to absorb the ideas of party luminaries (and in some cases national leaders) such as Otto Bauer, Emmy Freundlich, Adelheid Popp and Karl Renner. The Bauers and Renner actually taught at the college, as did Julius Deutsch and Friedrich Adler. Emhart's student contemporaries at the college included Franz Jonas, Bruno Kreisky, Anton Proksch and Otto Probst. Along with the chance to gather new political insights and ideas, attendance at the Academy provided ample networking opportunities of which, as became clear during the ensuing decades, Maria Emhart took full advantage. A particular friend (and lifelong political ally) whom she first met at this time was Rosa Jochmann, described by one admiring commentator as "one of the party's most energetic and idealistic young women".

At the local elections held on 9 May 1932 Maria Emhart was elected to membership of the local council. The industrial nature of the town was reflected in the fact that the SPÖ achieved, as at the previous election, an overall majority of votes and seats, despite a reduction in vote share from 64% (1927) to 54% (1932). There were 42 seats on the council: Emhart was one of just three women members. The focus of her work as a municipal councillor was on social matters. She sat as a member of at least three council sub-committees, on health, education and welfare. She also used her networking abilities to strengthen links between municipal councillors and workers' organisations, especially those organised by working women. Surviving letters to friends from her years of retirement clearly show that Emhart knew very well that she was filling the archetypal female niches in her political work. As the eldest of her parents' five children, she had at an early stage learned to look after her younger siblings as a mother and later, as her mother grew sick and worn down with the pressures created by poverty and the father's drinking, she found she was also acting as a surrogate mother to her own parents. Transferring those nurturing habits to her political career came completely naturally.

1932 was, as event subsequently turned out, the last year in which local elections were held in Austria for eighteen years 1950.

=== Democracy cancelled ===
In January 1933 the Hitler government took power and transformed Germany into a one-party dictatorship. Austria remained a separate country till 1938, but the same populist forces were at work. In Vienna Chancellor Dollfuss was emboldened to shut down parliament and assume dictatorial powers. The move away from democracy was not so brutally quick, and perhaps less minutely planned, than in Germany. Nevertheless, the February uprising in 1934 was energetically crushed by the army, and the police, operating in concert with paramilitary pro-fascist street fighters. It lasted only a week, but the extent of the violence on the city streets and the extent of the changes that followed, which included the "self-elimination" Parliament and the "disciplinary measures" imposed on non-fascist political parties including, notably, the SPÖ, have led some commentators to characterise that violent week in February as the "Austrian Civil War". Maria Emhart participated with practicality and passion, though reported details of her involvement are not entirely clear. It is clear that she was not averse to inflicting some violence for herself, having been coached in judo and martial arts by her husband. Many years later, in 1976, she would gleefully recall in a letter to a friend how she had bent back the thumb of a policemen who was trying to remove from her a large party banner during one of the demonstrations. The next day she had the added satisfaction of being arrested for questioning over the incident: the policeman said she had hurt him, and winked. (The wink, she inferred, identified him as a socialist or socialist sympathiser who was simply saying what he was required to say.) Emhart denied everything. The February uprising quickly triggered a vast palette of myths as to who did what, how many were killed, and who was responsible. The government promoted the narrative that "the Jews" were responsible. Despite scholarly attempts to derive a single narrative from the many recollections included by Emhart and her friends in correspondence, it has not been possible to distil a single chronology describing her own involvement, even if there is nothing half-baked about the heroic stature Emhart very rapidly acquired among antifascists. Phrases such as "possession of arms", "ringleadership" and "female Schutzbund commander" feature in court submissions of her doings during that week, but her eventual acquittal makes it impossible simply to interpret these at face value. Twenty years later, long after the Hitler nightmare had started to recede into the past, and democracy had returned to Austria, Emhart was still being questioned - generally by admirers and interviewers - about the role she had played in February 1934: her detailed replies, while no doubt well-intentioned - did nothing to pin down a clear timeline. She even gave apparently conflicting replies to questions of whether or not she was ever herself a member of the Socialist paramilitary "Schutzbund" organisation. An unambiguous statement that a woman was a member of paramilitary organisation would certainly have distressed many (in other respects progressive) male comrades: but at least one (female) commentator indicates that by unfailingly reacting to questions about her own paramilitary involvement with digressions about male sensibilities, both at her trial in 1934 and when called upon to remember those events twenty years later, she conspicuously declined to answer the questions as put. There can in any event be little doubt that she undertook "courier work" - including the smuggling of grenades and other weapons to combat locations - for the paramilitaries.

Along with engagement in the fighting, there are references to her prominent role in recruiting women to transport desperately needed munitions to male comrades fighting desperately from ad hoc strongholds on the streets. Well covered baby carriages were the conveyance of choice. (The thick covering would have been a necessary and unremarkable precaution even for transporting babies through city streets during a typical Austrian winter.) On the streets in her home town Maria Emhart acquired the soubriquet "Flintenweib" (loosely, "Musket Moll") in celebration of her fearless contribution to the ill-fated uprising.

Many of the most prominent SPÖ leaders had been arrested the night before fighting broke out. Other fighters fled in the immediate aftermath of those events to neighbouring Czechoslovakia. Emhart was involved in obtaining and supplying emergency medications and bandages to comrades who needed them. She knew that the police were looking for her, but ignored pleas from comrades that she should herself escape across the border. She felt that for her to fleeing abroad would mean letting down Schutzbund comrades in a time of great need.

On 20 February 1934 Maria Emhart was arrested "on suspicion of riot" by pro-government paramilitaries. She would later recall the ensuing interrogation by "Heimwehr" paramilitaries as "violent and humiliating". She overheard a group of pro-government paramilitaries gossiping, and speculating that as a "dangerous red" she was most likely to become the first woman to be hanged in Austria for many years. A more realistic outcome of any trial was a ten or fifteen-year prison term, but since the emergence of an Austrofascist government was a recent development, it was genuinely hard to know how the authorities would deal with political activists who had found themselves on the losing side in the February uprising. The morning following her arrest the paramilitaries who had been taunting her handed her over to the police. She remained in pre-trial police detention for the next four months, seriously fearful that once she faced a court she would be convicted and executed. Because of her known leadership role among Sankt Pölten socialists she was at times placed in solitary confinement. However, the cells at the court complex were overflowing in the aftermath of the February events, and there were also times during her pretrial detention when, at night, detainees were forced to sleep two to a bed. She obtained and no doubt contributed great strength through the camaraderie manifested by exchanging ideas with others incarcerated, using communication methods that included shouting through walls, knocking on the pipes in the cells, or simply singing songs together that echoed between the cells as the guards took their evening meal break together in another part of the complex. Nor were the inmates forgotten by comrades outside. On May Day they were cheered by a brass band marching loudly past the prison in solidarity. At nights the darkness of the cells was briefly illuminated as train drivers on the nearby track flashed their greetings: Karl Emhart, her railway-worker husband, was temporarily suspended for his suspected involvement with this development.

Maria Emhart faced her treason trial before a local court in June 1934. Sources are vague and contradictory about what happened, but at least one of them spells out that a jury failed to convict her, citing lack of evidence. Witnesses who testified that they had seen her wearing a dark coloured ski suit and carrying a leather bag with a revolver in it were evidently not believed. The St. Pöltner Nachrichten (newspaper) which by this time had become slavishly supportive of the government, reported that the witness statements on which the prosecution case depended were mutually contradictory. Records of those witness statements have not survived. Much of Emhart's testimony does survive, however, confirming reports that her performance in court was lucid and, as matters turned out, persuasive. Her denials were robust and her unapologetic commitment to socialism was on full display through the hearing. Emhart was accordingly acquitted by the jury and released. According to one source she was re-arrested on the way home from the court by police acting on orders from Vienna, but her husband was able to persuade the arresting policemen, on grounds of her "incapacity" ("Haftunfähigkeit"), to let her go. There were some among the responsible officials who were nevertheless determined that she should not go unpunished, and she was ordered to pay a 70 schilling fine for leading an illegal street protest.

A few days later she was attacked in the street by a gang of armed paramilitaries led by a man identified as Major Marinkowitsch. After this, believing that she would be in danger of attack or another arrest if she stayed in Sankt Pölten, during a ski break in the mountains she was transported (illegally) by friends across the border into Switzerland, where she spent six weeks in Davos. Elsewhere it is recorded that the principal reason for her visit to Davos was to obtain treatment for her Tuberculosis which had flared up during the exceptionally stressful preceding months. According to this version, her treatment was funded by Elisabeth Windisch-Graetz, popularly known as "the red archduchess", a committed lifelong socialist and a granddaughter of the late emperor. She remained in contact with comrades in Austria, however, as well as with her husband Karl who was subjected to police searches and close surveillance while she was away. After six weeks in her Davos sanitorium she received the message from Austria, "Rosl schwer erkrankt" ("Rosl seriously ill"). This was a coded message through which she was informed that in August 1934 her friend and political comrade, Rosa Jochmann, had been arrested, also in connection with the February events.

=== Revolutionary socialists ===
Emhart hastened back to Sankt Pölten to take over Jochmann's leadership responsibilities with the organisational structure for which they worked. The return journey was accomplished clandestinely and, as far as she knew, without the Austrian authorities being aware of it (at least till afterwards): according to at least one source she arrived back in Austria on skis. The SPÖ had been banned since February, and in effect replaced by a new "underground" resistance movement, the Austrian Revolutionary Socialists. Under these circumstances she operated under a false name, as "Grete Meyer": for much of the time she was working "underground" (her whereabouts not registered with the authorities) at the home of a family called "Stern", in Vienna. Details of her activity are, unsurprisingly, not known in much detail. She would herself later describe her role as the "Landesleiterin" ("regional head") of the "Lower Austria Revolutionary Socialists", as the temporary replacement for Rosa Jochmann. Objectives included creating and sustaining a functioning party apparatus while maintaining contacts with comrades internationally. Emhart also took charge of determining points in the city where copies of the "illegal" workers' newspaper might be left. Those distribution points had to be changed constantly for "security reasons".

=== Betrayal and detention ===
Despite the obvious risks, the Revolutionary Socialists held a number of meetings. As one of the more eloquent among the leading participants, Emhart featured prominently. At the end of December 1934 she took part in the group's national conference in Brno, across the border in Czechoslovakia. Six months after the assassination of Chancellor Dollfuss by extremist populists, his successor was well ensconced in the chancelry, and a return to democracy or any acknowledgment by government of socialist values seemed further away than ever. The two day conference was an important one, intended to chart a route to a new socialist cadre to resist fascism over the longer term. Emhart was one of just four women among the delegates. She and Karl Hans Sailer were elected to chair it.

It was a fractious meeting, as delegates argued over tactics: someone betrayed the participants to the Austrian authorities. Many of them were arrested within a few days of returning to Vienna. Maria Emhart was re-arrested on 26 or 28 January 1935. Anna, her sister-in-law, was arrested at the same time, but quickly released for lack of evidence. Maria was held in pre-trial detention, during which she underwent weeks if intense questioning and sleep deprivation. She was refused a change of clothes. Under intense mental and physical pressure, she experienced a deterioration in her health and another resurgence of her Tuberculosis. As a further device, the security services arrested Karl Emhart soon after capturing his wife, and ensured that she was made aware of the development. She was permitted to keep in touch with family and friends by letter, and her correspondence with Rosa Jochmann, who at this point was at liberty, are a valuable source. However, the correspondents were aware that their letters were subjected to scrutiny and censorship, so that much of what was written is at best cryptic, and at times inscrutable and/or clearly encoded. Her correspondence with Jochmann also includes clear references to her enforced divorce from Karl Emhart by which she was badly affected, despite her confidence that if they were ever released they would remain together, as indeed they did. Within the prison, the delegates were not segregated during their weeks of pretrial detention, and frequent communication seems to have been possible, meaning that news of comrades still at liberty which found its way inside was quickly circulated.

=== The great socialist trial ===
She was placed on trial in a hearing which was held at the Vienna District Criminal and which ran for 16 to 24 March 1936. Because she had been a co-chair of the Brno conference, she was picked out by the prosecuting authorities as one of the two principal accused persons, in what later came to be known as the "Great Socialist Trial". For Karl Hans Sailer and Maria Emhart the prosecutor demanded the death sentence. Most of Emhart's 26 other co-accused were slightly younger than she, but all 28 were grouped together for purposes of the trial since all faced the same basic charge that they had been illegally forming a "secret party organisation of socialists and communists, the Revolutionary Socialists" in defiance of the ban enacted by government in February 1934. 4 of the 28 were women. In addition to pressure from the government, the court also faced pressure internationally, since the case was an unusual one, and was widely reported abroad. Several of the accused subsequently emerged as leading national politicians: these included Bruno Kreisky, Franz Jonas, Otto Probst and Anton Proksch. Among the accused, Maria Emhart emerged as the most eloquent and passionate. Weeks of interrogation had completely failed to break her spirit, even if they had been destructive of her physical well-being. She told the court, "yes, I am an enthusiastic socialist" (Note: "Ja, ich bin begeisterte Sozialistin") and went on to explain why, in terms of "the poverty, misery and deprivations, as well as the humiliations, that one can expect to experience if one comes into the world on the bottom rungs of the social system.... as an individual one is powerless", but as a member of a powerful trades union or a working-class political party you could work with others to try and banish the ancient evils of "poverty, exploitation, injustice, and war". The unapologetic assertion, "yes, I am an enthusiastic socialist" quickly became a frequently invoked mantra when Maria Emhart's name came up in media reports.

There seems never to have been any question that the accused would not be found guilty. Possibly out of deference to international public opinion, however, and possibly out of a residual determination to honour the old enlightenment ideals of judicial independence, the court rejected prosecution demands over the sentencing. Maria Emhart was sentenced to a jail term of just eighteen months.

=== Under National Socialism ===
In the event she was released after just over a year in July 1936, in the context of that month's mass-amnesty. The 1936 "July amnesty" was enacted by the Austrian government as part of a broader agreement with Chancellor Hitler in Germany, which triggered the release of a large number of detainees identified as "political prisoners". Hitler's insistence on a political amnesty in the land of his birth was intended by him to secure the release of Austrian National Socialists, and it did. But many socialist political prisoners were included in it too, partly in an attempt to broaden support for the government. Emhart and then other 17 women released with her were pleasantly surprised by a development that had not been foreseen from inside the jail. She made her way to the Vienna apartment of her friend Rosa Jochmann. It is unlikely that any Vienna taxi driver or bus driver would accepted payment from her for the journey back to Sankt Pölten, but in the event Karl Emhart, who had by this time learned of the amnesty had made his way to Vienna, and was able to take her home.

There is relatively little detail in the sources with respect to Maria Emhart's life between 1936 and 1945, and it is reasonable to infer that she concentrated on trying to recover her health. In political terms, she kept a very low profile. She remained an unapologetic socialist but withdrew completely from her former leadership role within the movement. The railways transferred her husband's place of work to Bischofshofen (Salzburg), in a further attempt on the part of the authorities to split him from his "newly divorced" wife. If that was the case, the attempt failed. The couple lived together in a small rented apartment "with a Nazi as their landlord". Early in 1938 the hitherto separate state of Austria was integrated into Germany: the creation of a "Greater Germany" resonated with the aspirations of many Austrians, not all of whom were admirers of Adolf Hitler. For others who still just hated fascism, the development brought a progressively more structured form of tyranny and made it even more likely that Austria would become a participant and victim in the future European war which many now saw as all but inevitable. The Emharts were almost certainly under close surveillance by the security services, and links with former activist friends and comrades would have been low key, although there are references to socialist pamphlets being shipped out to Bischofshofen "for distribution by railway workers" in a town where socialism had been a powerful element in local politics during the democratic years. Emhart's own later recollections of the period are not without their contradictions, but she was self-evidently sufficiently isolated, politically, from former comrades to retain her life and liberty. She would have become aware through grapevine reports of the extent to which former socialist activists had escaped abroad or been arrested and taken to concentration camps in which many - especially those identified as Jewish - were murdered between 1942 and 1945. Closer to home, in 1937 and again in 1942 she survived two major waves of arrests of individuals identified by the government as "revolutionary socialists". While holding back from political engagement, Maria Emhart was able to send regular food parcels to comrades in the concentration camps, notably to her friend Rosa Jochmann who was among those socialist activist arrested - most recently - in 1939. Jochmann was held at the Ravensbrück concentration camp for women between 1940 and 1945.

In 1943 reports were received by the authorities that Maria Emhart had been listening to foreign radio stations. This had been illegal for some years, and the prohibition had been enforced with increasing urgency since the tide of the war had been reversed during the previous summer. A visit to the Emharts' home by the security services followed, but the matter was not further pursued. There were other heart stopping moments, but there is no mention in sources of Maria Emhart having been re-arrested after 1936, despite her previous high political profile.

=== State-level politics after the war ===
In 1945 the Emharts were still living in Bischofshofen near the railway depot to which Karl Emhart had been transferred back in 1936. As the German government collapsed, and before the liberation forces from the west and east arrived in Austria, Emhart was concerned that pro-Nazi populist gangsters might use the chaos of the times as cover for assassinating prominent socialists including her. That did not happen. While everyone worried over what might happen next she teamed up with a handful of fellow anti-Nazi comrades with whom she had worked before 1936. They now moved into the town hall and made a start on the massive reconstruction task that lay ahead. At the start of May 1945 the war ended formally and the entire Salzburg region was transferred to US military occupation. Maria Emhart was sent home from the town hall by an American officer, with the reassuring explanation that "politics in the community is a matter for the men". (Note: "Politik in der Gemeinde ist Männersache". An English-language source quotes the same no doubt well-intentioned American officer at greater length: "Can you cook, are you married? Then go home and cook, this work of local politics is a man's business.") Political activity was no longer restricted by law to National Socialist party members, and on 11 May 1945 she joined the SPÖ's provisional leadership team for the entire Salzburg province. She was indeed the only woman working in what was otherwise a group of men. Together they worked on re-establishing the party infrastructure across the province, while Emhart also applied her oratorical skills to delivering numberless speeches on behalf of the newly relaunched party. In the process she also rebuilt her own political profile. In November she was elected an SPÖ member of the Salzburg state parliament ("Landtag"). At that time the parliament had just 26 members. 25 of those elected to it on 25 November 1945 were men.

The postwar military occupation of Austria lasted from 1945 till 1955, and involved the division of the country into four military zones of occupation. (Separate, theoretically equivalent, arrangements applied to Vienna.) The decade was characterised by a certain amount of jostling between the victorious wartime allies concerning the current governance and future political direction of Austria. Progress was not uniform between the different occupation zones. The entire Salzburg region was part of the US occupation zone, in which during the twelve months following the war preparations were made for a return to more democratic structures. On 18 April 1946 Maria Emhart was elected deputy mayor in the little town of Bischofshofen, retaining the office for the next twenty-two years, retiring from it only in August 1966. She was the first woman to hold such a post anywhere in Austria. Recalling her encounter in 1945 with the American officer who had memorably provided her with the advice that local politics was a matter for the men, she would later ruefully recall that throughout her period in office she had managed to combine her deputy mayoral duties (and other political responsibilities) with cooking meals at home for herself and indeed, when necessary, for her husband.

While combining her roles as a Salzburg parliamentarian and Bischofshofen deputy mayor, Emhart was also spending a certain amount of time in Vienna as a member of the party's so-called "Women's Committee". Both in Venna and in Salzburg, much political energy during the immediate post-war period had to be focused simply on trying to find ways to ensure adequate provision of food, clothing and shelter, and at the same time give leadership during a period of desperately needed reconstruction in respect not merely of buildings that had been replaced by piles of rubble, but also of peoples' shattered morale. Conditions in Vienna were particularly difficult: there are specific references to Emhart's involvement with various charitable initiatives in that city during the immediate postwar period in which large numbers of badly wounded city folk jostled on the streets with refugees pouring in from the east.

As deputy mayor she worked alongside her party comrade, the longstanding mayor Franz Moßhammer. According to the author-politician Siegfried Nasko, a friend and mentor since the 1930s, Emhart conducted the mayoral business, while Mayor Moßhammer "was passive". The arrangement seems to have worked for both of them. Someone proposed that Emhart should take on the position of mayor, but she herself defended the existing position: "The farmers round here simply won't accept a woman mayor" (Note: "Die Bauern akzeptieren einfach keinen weiblichen Bürgermeister.")

=== National politics ===
In 1950 Karl Emhart, who was probably significantly older than his wife, retired from the railways and, according to at least one source, took charge of running the couples' home. This left Maria Emhart with more time for politics. Austria's first postwar national election was held in 1953. Maria Emhart stood successfully as a Salzburg-region SPÖ candidate, sitting as a member of parliament for the next twelve years. During the first session she was a member of the parliamentary defence committee and of the parliamentary audit committee. She later became a member of the parliamentary justice committee and of the parliamentary transport committee. At the national level, as at the local level, she continued to prove herself an effective advocate for improvements in living and working conditions as well as for the rights of women and the elimination of social injustices.

By 1964 Karl Emhart was very seriously ill. Maria Emhart resigned from parliament in 1965 in order to concentrate on looking after him.

=== Final years ===
Karl Emhart died just three months after his wife withdrew from public life to look after him. Maria spent the final fifteen years of her life as a widow. She fell into a deep depression, and wrote in letters of taking her own life. She did not do that, and over time the darker clouds of depression seem to have lifted. Widowhood did, however, enable to devote more time to her friends, many of whom were also fellow political activists with whom she had worked in her younger days. Considerable time and energy went into her letters, which became an important resource for historians and other researchers after her death.

Maria Emhart died at Bischofshofen on 9 October 1981.
