= Stradal (disambiguation) =

Stradal refers to August Stradal, a Czech musical artist. It may also refer to:

- Emmy Stradal (1877–1925), Austrian politician
- Stradal House, historic house in Kansas, USA
