= Afritsch =

Afritsch is a German surname. Notable people with the surname include:

- Anton Afritsch (1873–1924), Austrian journalist and politician
- Josef Afritsch (1901–1964), Austrian horticulturalist and politician
