= Karl Kummer (politician) =

Austrian politician, social reformer, and labour law reformer (1904-1967)

Karl Kummer (born 1 January 1904 in Vienna; died 15 August 1967 in Warsaw) was an Austrian catholic politician, social reformer, and labour law reformer.

== See also ==
- List of members of the Austrian Parliament who died in office
