= List of members of the Austrian Parliament who died in office =

List of Austrian MPs who died in office

The following is a list of members of the Parliament of Austria who died in office.

== Federal Council ==
Member	Party	State	Date of death	Age at death (years)	Cause
Otto Steinwender	GDVP	Carinthia	20 March 1921	74	
Josef Schraffl	CS	Tyrol	11 January 1922	66	
Anton Lanner	Independent	Styria	9 November 1924	41	Road accident
Ludo Moritz Hartmann	SPÖ	Vienna	14 November 1924	59	
Jakob Reumann	SPÖ	Vienna	29 July 1925	71	
Franz Reinprecht	CS	Carinthia	30 August 1929	42	
Alois Dienstleder	ÖVP	Styria	31 January 1946	60	
Karl Tolde	ÖVP	Vienna	25 June 1946	58	
Rudolf Kait	ÖVP	Vienna	20 February 1947	58	
Josef Mayer	ÖVP	Upper Austria	6 January 1948	49	
Friedrich Langthaler	ÖVP	Upper Austria	16 February 1949	55	
Hans Hladnik	SPÖ	Styria	17 September 1951	50	
Hans Menzl	SPÖ	Lower Austria	31 December 1951	57	
Georg Resch	ÖVP	Styria	7 November 1952	60	
Eugen Fleischacker	ÖVP	Vienna	31 March 1953	53	
Franz Schulz	SPÖ	Vienna	25 March 1956	64	
Adalbert Duschek	SPÖ	Vienna	7 June 1957	61	
Karl Etlinger	ÖVP	Lower Austria	14 April 1959	63	
Leopold Babitsch	ÖVP	Styria	15 June 1960	56	
Reinhard Machold	SPÖ	Styria	6 February 1961	81	
Rudolf Appel	SPÖ	Lower Austria	1 June 1967	51	
Herbert Guglberger	ÖVP	Tyrol	25 September 1971	62	
Josef Preindl	ÖVP	Tyrol	3 November 1972	51	
Franz Walzer	ÖVP	Vienna	2 December 1975	56	
Johann Wagner	ÖVP	Vienna	10 December 1976	59	
Josef Schweiger	SPÖ	Vienna	24 February 1977	56	
Rudolf Schwaiger	ÖVP	Tyrol	10 March 1986	65	
Paul Raab	ÖVP	Upper Austria	17 April 1986	65	
Anton Berger	SPÖ	Burgenland	17 August 1986	58	
Engelbert Schaufler	ÖVP	Lower Austria	20 November 2000	59	
Harald Reisenberger	SPÖ	Vienna	16 December 2009	53	
Gerhard Leitner	SPÖ	Carinthia	19 May 2020	69	

== National Council ==
Member	Party	Date of death	Age at death (years)	Cause
Victor Adler	SPÖ	11 November 1918	66	
Rudolf Sommer	DNP	20 January 1919	46	
Kamill Kuranda	DNP	1 February 1919	67	
Michael Mayr	CS	21 May 1922	58	Kidney failure
Hans Laimer	SPÖ	23 November 1922	42	
Theodor Scheffauer	CS	20 March 1923	44	
Friedrich Waneck	DVP	18 April 1923	42	
Josef Siegl	CS	20 August 1923	36	
Robert Kleißl	CS	21 August 1923	35	
Ferdinand Hanusch	SPÖ	28 September 1923	56	
Josef Wiedenhofer	SPÖ	4 November 1924	51	
Fritz Reiner	CS	13 November 1925	45	
Emmy Stradal	GDVP	21 November 1925	48	
Hermann Schulz	SPÖ	18 February 1926	51	
Julie Rauscha	SPÖ	19 February 1926	47	Pneumonia
Rudolf Gruber	CS	13 October 1926	45	
Karl Niedrist	CS	9 November 1926	63	Peritonitis
Laurenz Widholz	SPÖ	19 November 1926	65	
Johann Nepomuk Hauser	CS	8 February 1927	61	
Heinrich Zwenk	SPÖ	16 April 1927	51	
Josef Eisenhut	CS	29 February 1928	63	
Friedrich Schönsteiner	CS	2 April 1928	48	Colon cancer
Franz Odehnal	CS	24 December 1928	57	
Karl Volkert	SPÖ	24 February 1929	61	
Jodok Fink	CS	1 July 1929	76	
Franz Domes	SPÖ	11 July 1930	67	
Simon Geisler	CS	11 April 1931	62	
Matthias Eldersch	SPÖ	20 April 1931	62	
Franz Birbaumer	CS	17 September 1931	59	
Josef Wiesmaier	CS	21 December 1931	60	
Johannes Schober	National Economy Bloc	19 August 1932	57	Heart disease
Johann Janecek	SPÖ	24 October 1932	51	
August von Wotawa	National Economy Bloc	23 May 1933	56	
Hermann Hermann	SPÖ	21 July 1933	62	
Hermann Fischer	SPÖ	6 September 1933	56	
Franz Ertl	CS	9 December 1933	61	
Josef Stemberger	ÖVP	8 July 1947	57	
Josef Ninaus	SPÖ	22 September 1947	68	
Paul Speiser	SPÖ	8 November 1947	70	
Franz Lach	ÖVP	15 September 1948	61	
Hilde Krones	SPÖ	16 December 1948	38	Suicide by drug overdose
Hans Lagger	SPÖ	12 April 1949	66	Complications from a bladder operation
Otto Steinegger	ÖVP	17 January 1950	61	
Karl Seitz	SPÖ	3 February 1950	80	Heart failure
Victor Petschnik	SPÖ	8 July 1951	51	
Karl Gföller	SPÖ	6 August 1952	61	
Anton Gasselich	VdU	9 February 1953	64	
Georg Franz	ÖVP	4 March 1953	53	
Leopold Kunschak	ÖVP	13 March 1953	81	
Josef Böck-Greissau	ÖVP	21 April 1953	60	
Hans Draxler	SPÖ	5 July 1953	61	
Josef Hummer	ÖVP	7 October 1954	53	
Franz Stoll	ÖVP	15 November 1956	54	Heart attack
Andreas Stampler	SPÖ	12 January 1958	60	
Leo Geiger	SPÖ	5 February 1958	58	
Anton Haller	ÖVP	15 April 1958	50	Heart attack
Karl Gruber	ÖVP	16 September 1958	49	
Alfred Horn	SPÖ	10 March 1959	60	Heart disease
Johann Böhm	SPÖ	13 May 1959	73	
Peter Strasser	SPÖ	6 June 1962	44	Cancer
Julius Raab	ÖVP	8 January 1964	72	
Josef Afritsch	SPÖ	25 August 1964	63	Heart attack
Leopold Figl	ÖVP	9 May 1965	62	Kidney cancer
Barthold Stürgkh	ÖVP	22 June 1965	66	
Josef Matejcek	SPÖ	4 October 1965	61	
Erwin Steinmaßl	SPÖ	29 April 1967	42	
Rosa Weber	SPÖ	24 July 1967	47	Accident
Karl Kummer	ÖVP	15 August 1967	63	
Wilhelm Liwanec	SPÖ	17 June 1968	54	
Franz Prinke	ÖVP	4 January 1969	70	
Otto Kranzlmayr	ÖVP	4 May 1972	60	
Franz Horr	SPÖ	6 January 1974	60	
Hermann Wielandner	SPÖ	21 November 1974	54	
Ernst Ulbrich	SPÖ	5 December 1974	59	
Karl Schleinzer	ÖVP	19 July 1975	51	Road accident
Josef Ofenböck	ÖVP	16 November 1975	56	
Karl Kinzl	ÖVP	4 August 1977	60	
Karl Troll	SPÖ	17 August 1977	54	
Karl Czernetz	SPÖ	3 August 1978	68	
Otto Probst	SPÖ	22 December 1978	66	
Michael Maderthaner	SPÖ	14 August 1981	56	
Josef Hirscher	SPÖ	24 April 1983	52	
Johann Gassner	ÖVP	5 July 1985	52	
Roland Minkowitsch	ÖVP	22 January 1986	66	
Jakob Brandstätter	ÖVP	25 February 1987	58	
Walter Heinzinger	ÖVP	27 January 1993	58	
Jakob Pistotnig	FPÖ	24 July 2001	56	Workplace accident
Brunhilde Plank	SPÖ	31 July 2001	45	Accident
Josef Trinkl	ÖVP	26 April 2004	52	
Barbara Prammer	SPÖ	2 August 2014	60	Pancreatic cancer
Sabine Oberhauser	SPÖ	23 February 2017	53	Abdominal cancer
Barbara Wolfgang-Krenn	ÖVP	3 February 2019	49	Cancer
