= Siegfried Nasko =

Austrian politician and author

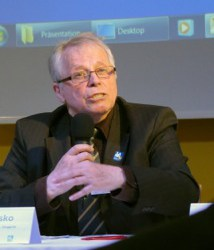

Siegfried Nasko (born 22 March 1943 in Graz, Austria) is an Austrian former politician (SPÖ) and author. From 2003 to 2005, he was a deputy of the State Parliament of Lower Austria.

== Early life and education ==
After initially training to be a baker, Nasko studied history and German language and literature at the University of Vienna. In 1971, he was appointed to the post of civil servant of the Magistrate of St. Pölten. In 1981 he was awarded the Theodor Körner Prize and 1983 with the Ludwig Jedlicka Memorial Prize. He was also awarded the title of professor.

== Political career ==
In the political field, Nasko became a member of the municipal council in St. Pölten from 1984 onwards, and since the municipal elections 1991 to 2003 he has been a councillor. He represented the SPÖ from 24 April 2003 to 7 November 2005 in the State Parliament of Lower Austria. In 2006, he was awarded the Jakob Prandtauer Prize for Science and Art of the City of St. Pölten.

In 2014 he received the Austrian Honorary Consulate for Science and Art, and in 2015 the Great Emblem for Services to the Province of Lower Austria.

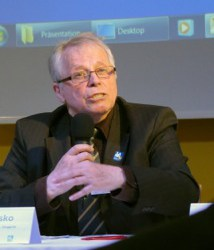
Siegfried Nasko speaking at the Renner-Stalin Letters Symposium at the Niederösterreich National Museum

== Publications ==
- With Willibald Rosner and others: St. Pölten in the 20th century - History of a City. Residence, Salzburg / St. Pölten, 2010, ISBN 9783701731558
- Empower from Dull Dreams - Worker movement and Social Democracy in the St. Pöltner area. SPÖ-Bezirksorganisation, Vienna / St. Pölten 1986.
- With Thomas Karl: City guide St. Pölten. Magistrate of the State Capital St. Pölten, 1993.
- With Johannes Reichl: Karl Renner. Interconnection and Europe. Holzhausen, Wien 2000, ISBN 3854930267
- Karl Renner: Unjustly controversial? A search for truth. Residence, Salzburg, 2016, ISBN ISBN 9783701734009
- Auf der Suche nach Babaji: Erinnerungen und Beobachtungen. Books on Demand, 2020, ISBN 978-3-7528-9459-2
- Karl Renner und der Anschluss: Akteure und Hintergründe. Verlagshaus Schlosser, 6 December 2024, ISBN 978-3-7581-0088-8
