= Josef Afritsch =

Austrian horticulturalist and politician (1901–1964)

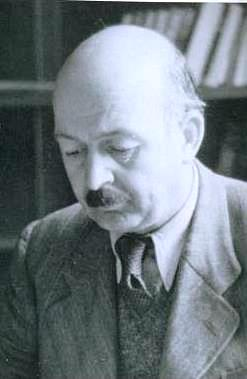
- Josef Afritsch ca. 1955
- Born: 13 March 1901; Graz, Duchy of Styria, Austria-Hungary
- Died: 25 August 1964 (aged 63)
- Occupations: Horticulturalist; Politician; Minister of the Interior
- Political party: SPÖ
- Parent: Anton Afritsch father

Josef "Beppo" Afritsch (13 March 1901 – 25 August 1964) was an Austrian horticulturalist who became a politician (SPÖ). Between 1959 and 1963 he served as the country's Interior minister.

In 1964, just a few weeks before his sudden death, a rose was named after him, "Minister Afritsch".

== Life ==
=== Provenance and early years ===
Josef Afritsch was born at the start of the twentieth century in Graz, at that time the sixth largest city in Austria-Hungary. His father was the journalist and pioneering campaigner for child welfare, Anton Afritsch (1873-1924). His brother, Viktor Afritsch (1906-1967), later came to prominence as a stage and movie actor. Afritsch underwent a conventional schooling, followed by three years at Horticultural Academy in Eisgrub, South Moravia. In 1923 or 1926 he joined the city of Vienna's Parks and Gardens service, which he helped to rebuild in the chaotic aftermath of war. Here he organised the city's official Plant Protection Service ("Pflanzenschutzdienst ")

=== Politics ===
In parallel with his work for the Parks Department he worked as an official of the Social Democratic Party. After the bloody streets fights of February 1934, until 1938 Afritsch was an active participant in the welfare activities of the "Society of Friends". Tasks included the distribution of donations received from Great Britain and the United States to working class Viennese families who had fallen into penury through loss of family income caused by the death, injury or detention of the family wage earner. In 1938, a few months after the incorporation of Austria into Nazi Germany, it was Josef Afritsch who applied trades union funds to obtain a ticket on Lufthansa's inaugural scheduled flight from Vienna to Berlin for Bruno Kreisky, the future Federal Chancellor, who both as a SPÖ activist and as a Jew had repeatedly fallen foul of the pro-Nazi government since 1934. From Berlin Kreisky was able to fly on to Denmark and then to Sweden where he spent the next eight years in political exile.

In 1942 he was relieved of his public service duties and arrested. Ten months in prison ("Kerker") ensued, followed by two years in a penitentiary ("Zuchthaus").

=== After the war ===
Between 1945 and 1959 Afritsch was a member of the Vienna City Council and a member of the Vienna Regional Legislature (Landtag). In 1946 he was formally elected to the City Office for General Administrative Matters, an office to which he had been appointed the previous year under the conditions of military occupation. He continued in this position for a long time, acquiring a deep knowledge of various aspects of city administration, and taking care of the naturalisation of tens of thousands of ethnic Germans displaced by the ethnic cleansing that was a feature of the postwar settlement.

In 1951 he was appointed Director of the City Parks and Gardens, but he was immediately sent on leave in order that he might continue his existing administrative responsibilities for the city authorities.

In July 1959 he was appointed Austria's Interior minister in the Grand Coalition government led by Chancellor Raab (ÖVP), in 1961 retaining the position, under Chancellor Gorbach (ÖVP), till 1963. Between 14 December 1962 and 25 August 1965 he sat as a member of the Austrian parliament ("Nationalrat").

His final government post was as the Government Commissioner for the Vienna International Garden festival which was held in the Danube Park (as it has been called since that time) between 16 April and 11 October 1964. It was during the festival, on 9 July, that the "Minister Afritsch" rose, named in his honour, was presented.

Josef Afritsch died suddenly, just a few weeks later, on 25 August.

== Awards and honours ==
- 1957 Republic of Austria Decoration of Honour in Gold
- 1960 Bavarian Order of Merit
- 1962 Republic of Austria Grand Decoration of Honour in Gold with Sash

== See also ==
- List of members of the Austrian Parliament who died in office
