= Ludo Moritz Hartmann =

Austrian historian and politician (1865–1924)

Ludo (Ludwig) Moritz Hartmann (2 March 1865, Stuttgart – 14 November 1924) was an Austrian historian, diplomat and Social Democratic politician. He advocated an anti-metaphysical and materialist approach to history.

== Early life ==
He was the son of the poet Moritz Hartmann and his wife Bertha, daughter of Achilles Roediger, a Genevan headmaster and bourgeois liberal educators. From 1872, when Ludwig was seven, his father suffered a long term illness and was often bed-ridden. One consequence of this was that he not only spent a lot of time with his father, but also met a variety of bankers, writers, scientists, doctors, artists and university professors who came to visit his father. These included the politician Ludwig Bamberger, the surgeon Theodor Billroth, the philosopher of history, Theodor Gomperz, the legal historian Adolf Exner and the historian Heinrich Friedjung. After his father's death, his mother prioritised his education with support from Bamberger. He subsequently attended Gymnasium Wasagasse and went on to study history, legal history and political economy at the Universities of Vienna and Berlin. Among his teachers were Otto Hirschfeld, Lujo Brentano and particularly Theodor Mommsen.

== Popular education ==
He was an advocate of popular education, establishing a 'popular university course at the People's College. There is a biennial Ludo Hartmann prize awarded by the Verband Österreichischer Volkshochschulen.

The Ludo-Hartmann-Platz in Ottakring, Vienna, is named after him.

== Works ==
=== In English ===
- (1949) The early mediaeval state; Byzantium, Italy and the West London: The Historical Association

== See also ==
- List of members of the Austrian Parliament who died in office
