= Stradal =

Stradal is a surname. Notable people with the surname include:

- August Stradal (1860–1930), Czech pianist and composer
- Emmy Stradal (1877–1925), Austrian politician and feminist
