= Matthias Eldersch =

Austrian politician (1869–1931)

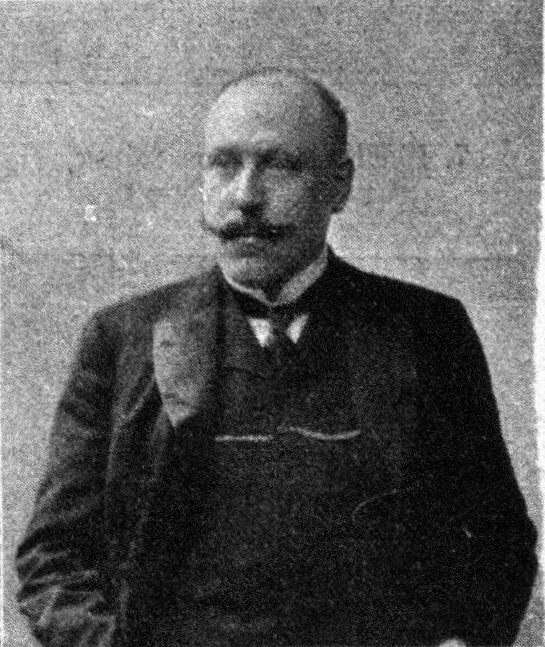

President of the National Council
- In office 4 December 1930 – 20 April 1931
- Preceded by: Alfred Gürtler
- Succeeded by: Karl Renner

Minister of the Interior and Education
- In office 9 May 1919 – 7 July 1920
- Preceded by: Heinrich Mataja
- Succeeded by: Walter Breisky

Minister of Justice
- In office 24 June 1920 – 7 July 1920
- Preceded by: Rudolf Ramek
- Succeeded by: Julius Roller

Personal details
- Born: 24 February 1869 Brno, Moravia, Austria-Hungary
- Died: 20 April 1931 (aged 62) Vienna, Austria
- Party: Social Democratic Workers' Party

Matthias Eldersch (24 February 1869 – 20 April 1931) was an Austrian social democratic politician.

== Biography ==
Eldersch was born into a poor working-class family. After his father's death, he started to work as an apprentice carpenter. He joined the Social Democratic Workers' Party of Austria and In 1892, he took over the management of the social democratic weekly in Brno. He was its editor and from 1896 an official of the workers' hospital cash register in Brno. Because of his political activities, he was repeatedly punished by the court.

By the beginning of the 20th-century, Eldersch became involved in national politics. From 1901 to 1911 he was a member of the Reichsrat. In 1911 he became Reich Commissioner for Health Insurance. After the founding of the republic in 1918, Eldersch first became director of the People's Food Office and was responsible for the food supply. From 1919 to 1923 a member of the Municipal Council of the City of Vienna. He was also a member of the Constituent National Assembly and in May 1919 took over the State Secretariat for Interior Affairs and Education in Karl Renner's government, which he held until July 1920. Under him, Under-Secretary of State Otto Glöckel began drafting guidelines for school reform. From 1922 to 1925 he was president and Director of Hammerbrotwerke and a board member of Arbeiterbank.

In 1920 he moved into the newly formed National Council, which he was a member of until 1931. At first he worked in the social committee, in which he devoted himself in particular to the expansion of those social laws that Ferdinand Hanusch had prepared. From 1923 to 1930 he served as second and from 1930 to 1931 as first President of the National Council. In 1928 he also took over the presidency of the 3rd Federal Assembly.

Eldersch died in April 1931 and was buried a few days later in the urn grove of the Vienna Central Cemetery, to the great sympathy of the population. His honorary grave is located in the urn grove of the Feuerhalle Simmering.

In his memory, a municipal housing complex built in 1931/1932 and a square in Vienna-Leopoldstadt were named Elderschhof or Elderschplatz in 1933.

== See also ==
- List of members of the Austrian Parliament who died in office
