= Pyhra =

- Municipality
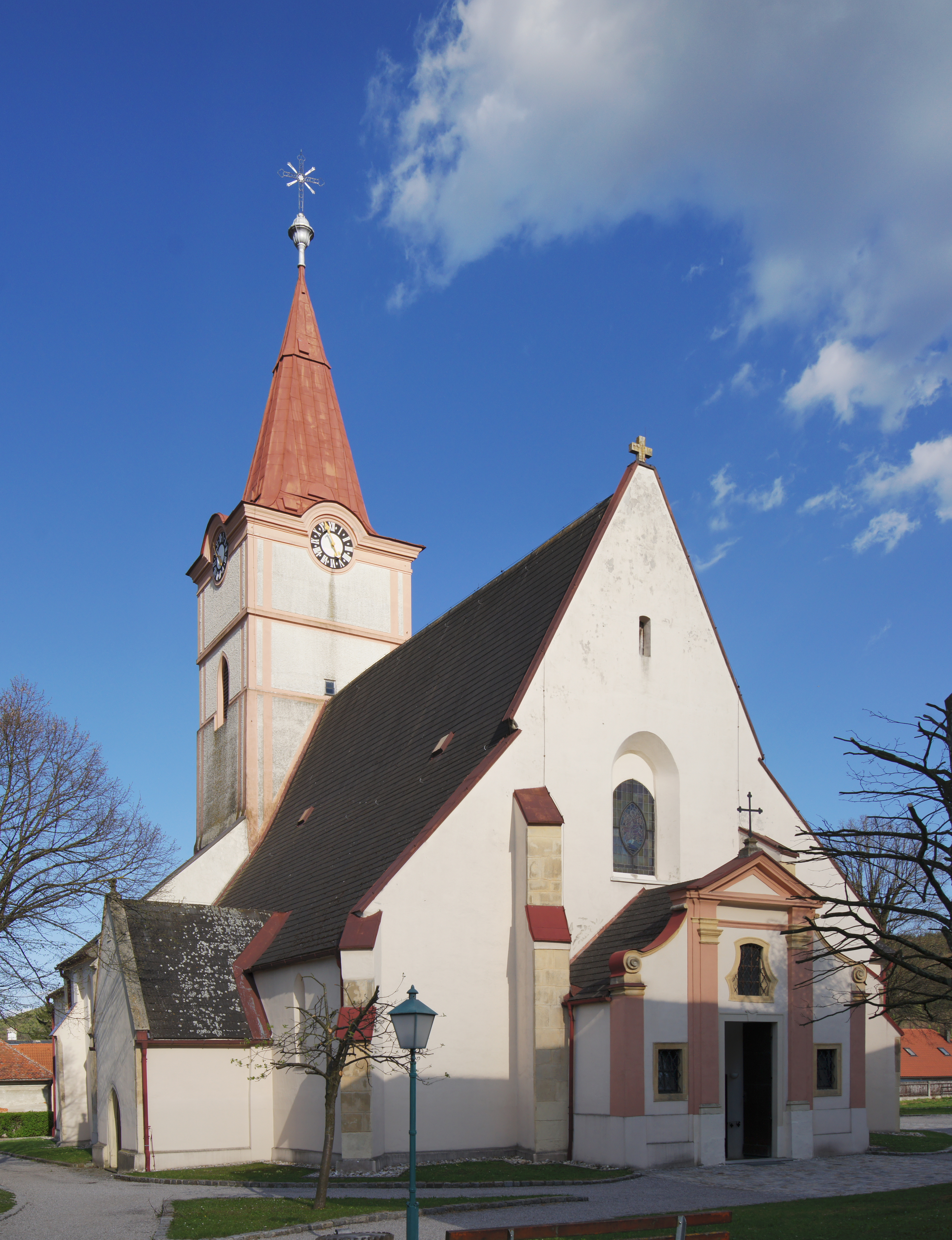
- Pyhra parish church

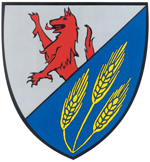
- Coat of arms

- Location within Austria
- Coordinates: 48°9′N 15°41′E
- Country: Austria
- State: Lower Austria
- District: Sankt Pölten-Land

Government
  - Mayor: Günter Schaubach

Area
  - Total: 66.77 km^{2} (25.78 sq mi)
- Elevation: 298 m (978 ft)

Population (2018-01-01)
  - Total: 3,553
  - Density: 53.21/km^{2} (137.8/sq mi)
- Time zone: UTC+1 (CET)
  - Summer (DST): UTC+2 (CEST)
- Postal code: 3143
- Area code: 02745
- Website: http://www.pyhra.gv.at

Pyhra (German pronunciation: [ˈpyːʁa]) is a town with 3286 inhabitants in the district of Sankt Pölten-Land in Lower Austria, Austria.

== Geography ==
Pyhra is located in the hill country of the Mostviertel in Lower Austria, near the city St. Pölten. The biggest mountain is the Amerlingkogel (628 m).

The area is 66.73 square kilometers big. 40.04 per cent of the area is wooded.

== Districts ==
Districts are Adeldorf, Aigen, Atzling, Auern, Baumgarten, Blindorf, Brunn, Ebersreith, Egelsee, Fahra, Gattring-Raking, Getzersdorf, Heuberg, Hinterholz, Hummelberg bei Hinterholz, Kirchweg, Nützling, Oberburbach, Obergrub, Oberloitzenberg, Obertiefenbach, Perersdorf, Perschenegg, Pyhra, Reichenhag, Reichgrüben, Schauching, Schnabling, Steinbach, Unterburbach, Unterloitzenberg, Wald, Weinzettl, Wieden, Windhag, Zell and Zuleithen.

== Neighbour municipalities ==
Pyhra borders Böheimkirchen in the northeast, Kasten by Böheimkirchen and Michelbach in the east, St. Veit on the Gölsen in the south, Wilhelmsburg in the southwest, and St. Pölten in the west and northwest.

== Schools ==
NÖ Landeskindergarten, Volksschule Pyhra, Europa-Hauptschule Pyhra, Landwirtschaftliche Fachschule Pyhra and the music school of the Perschlingtal.
