= St. Pölten =

Capital city of Lower Austria

Sankt Pölten Sankt Pödn (Bavarian)
- Statutory city
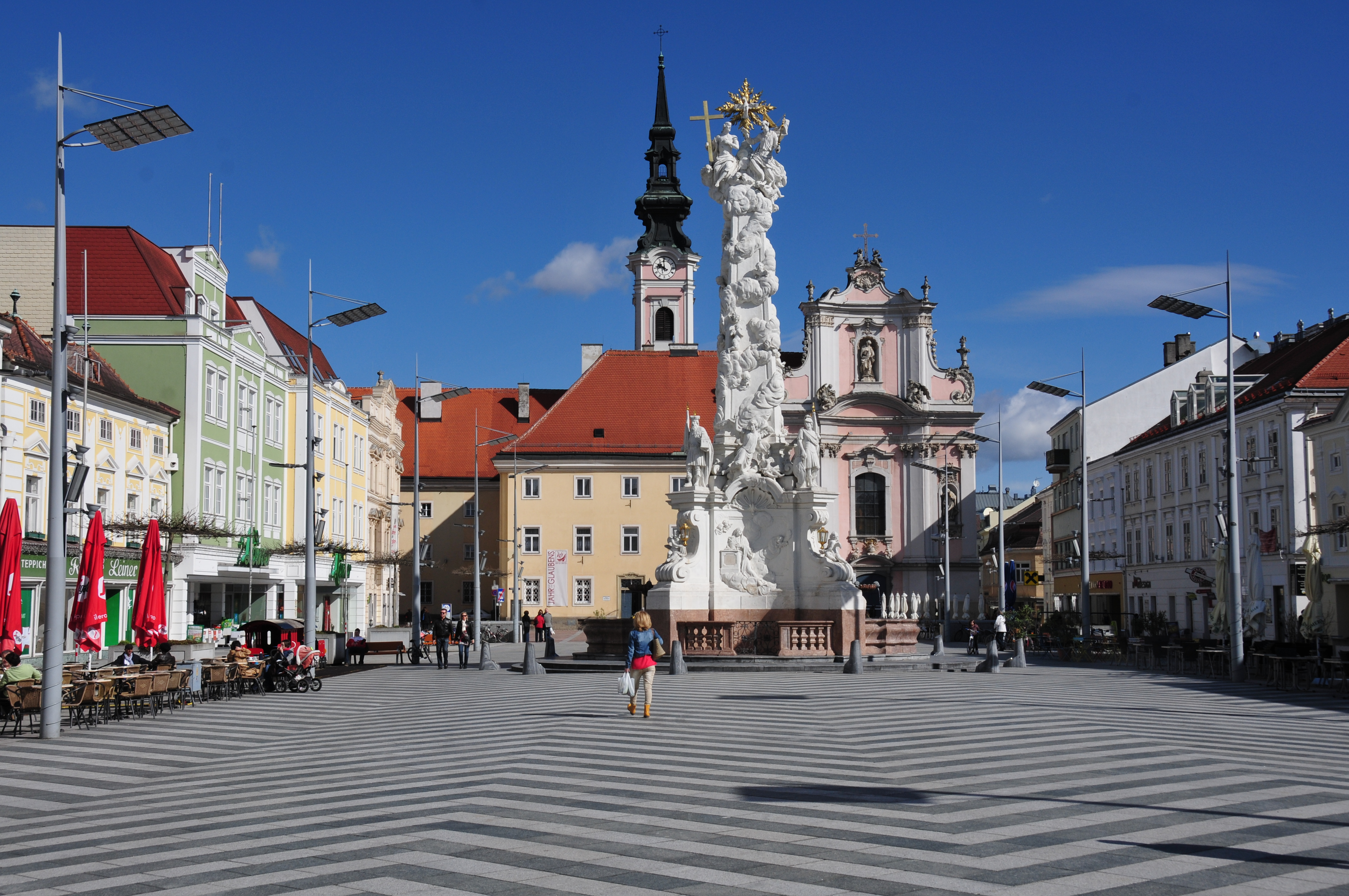
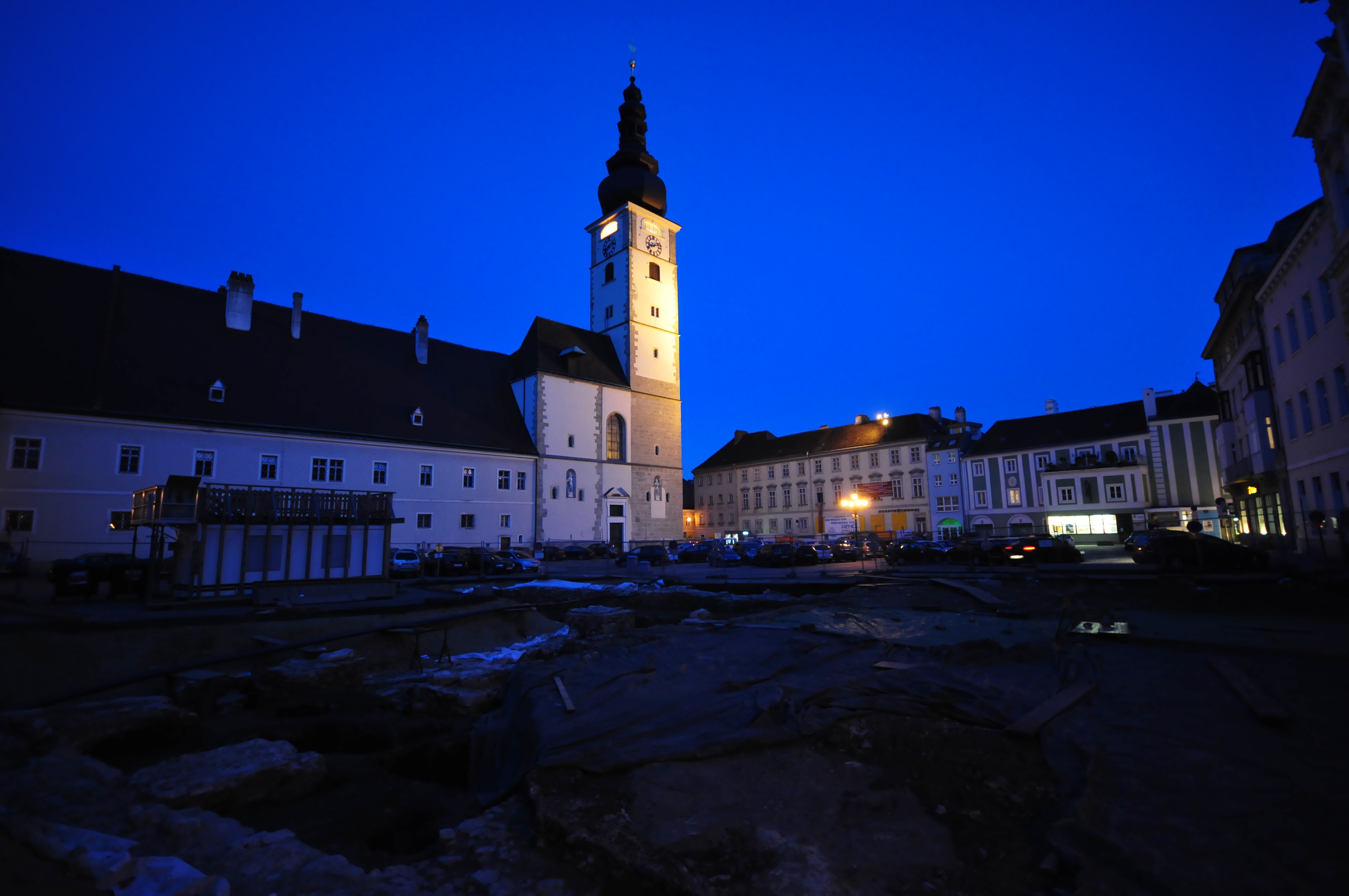
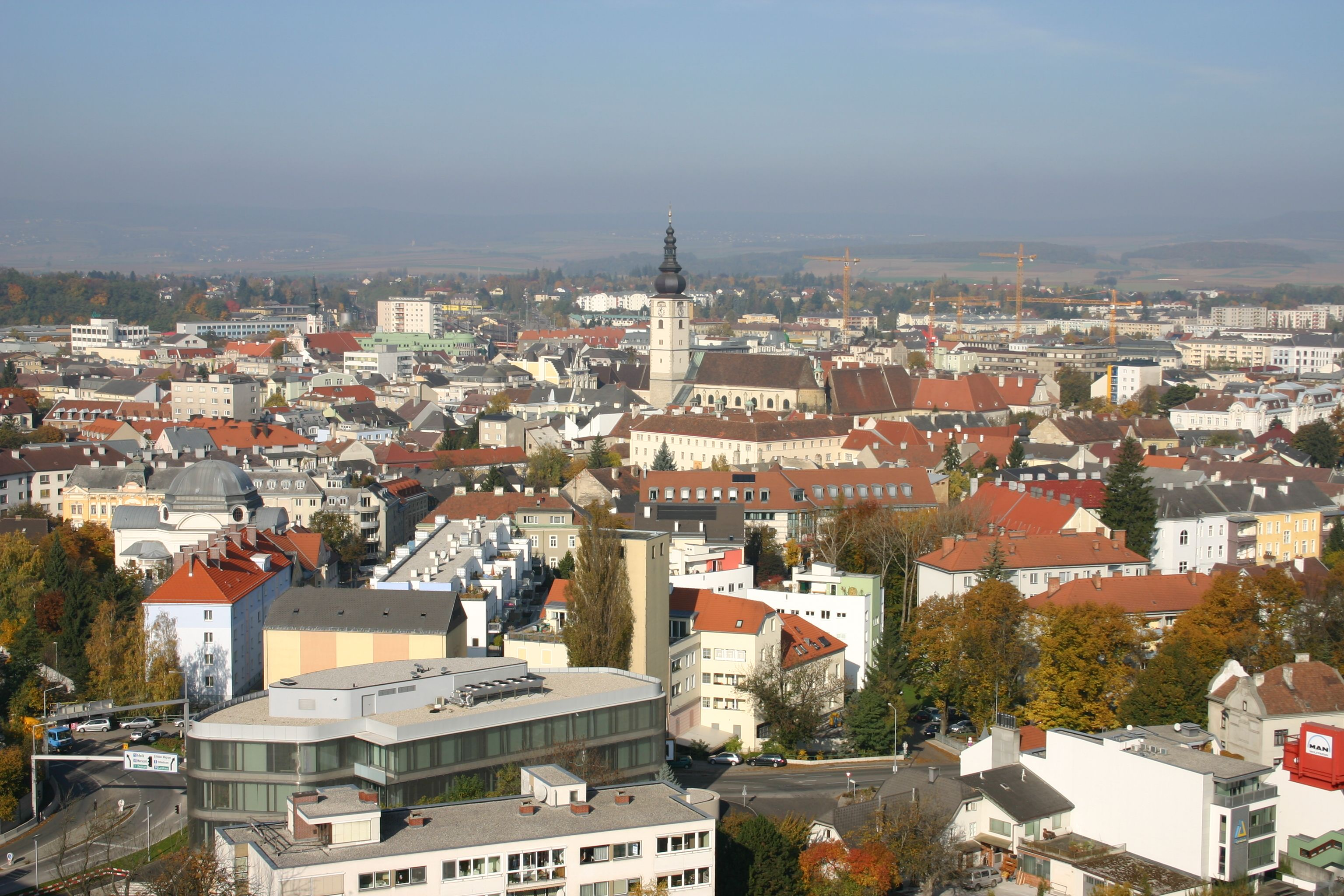
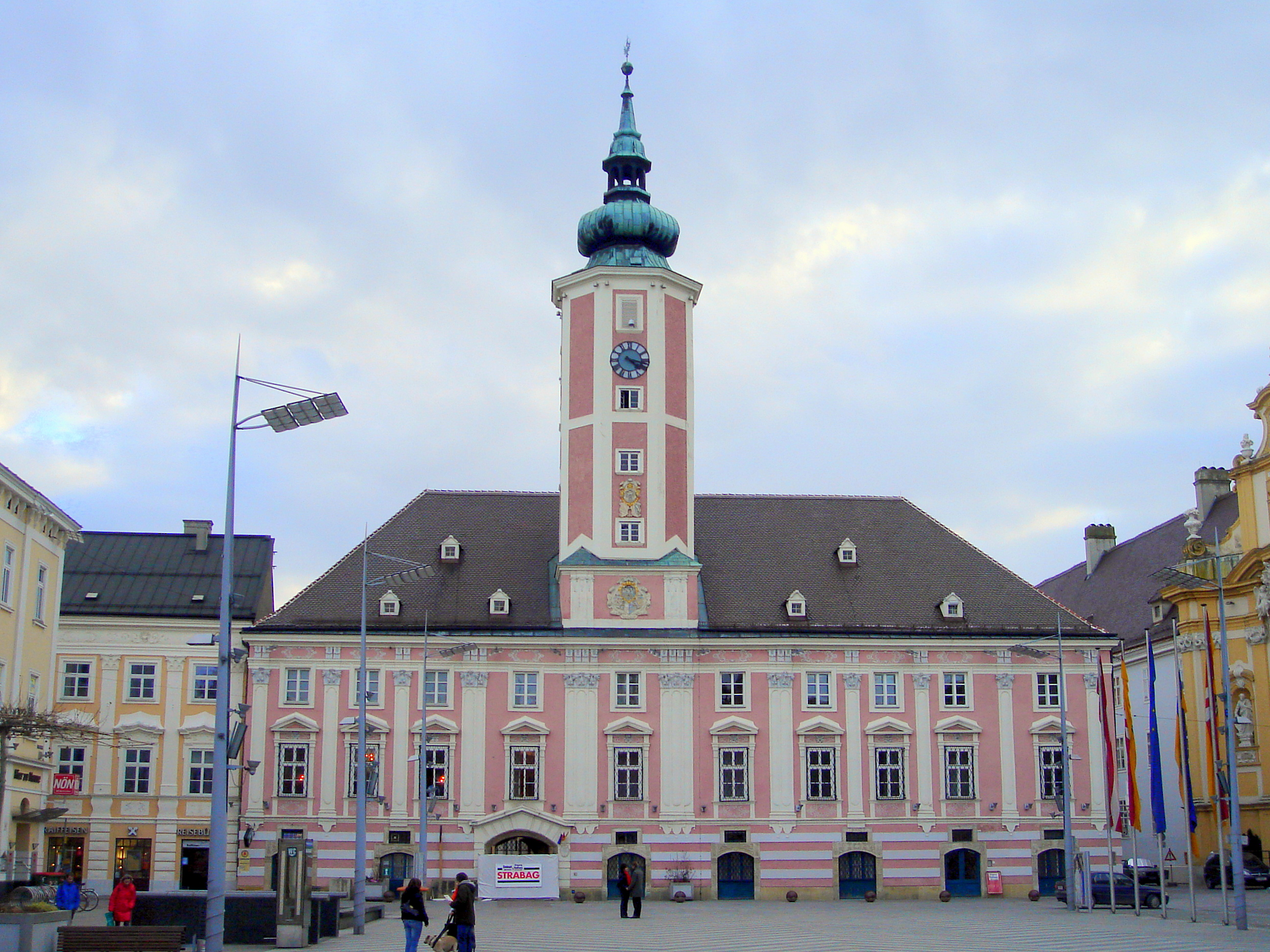
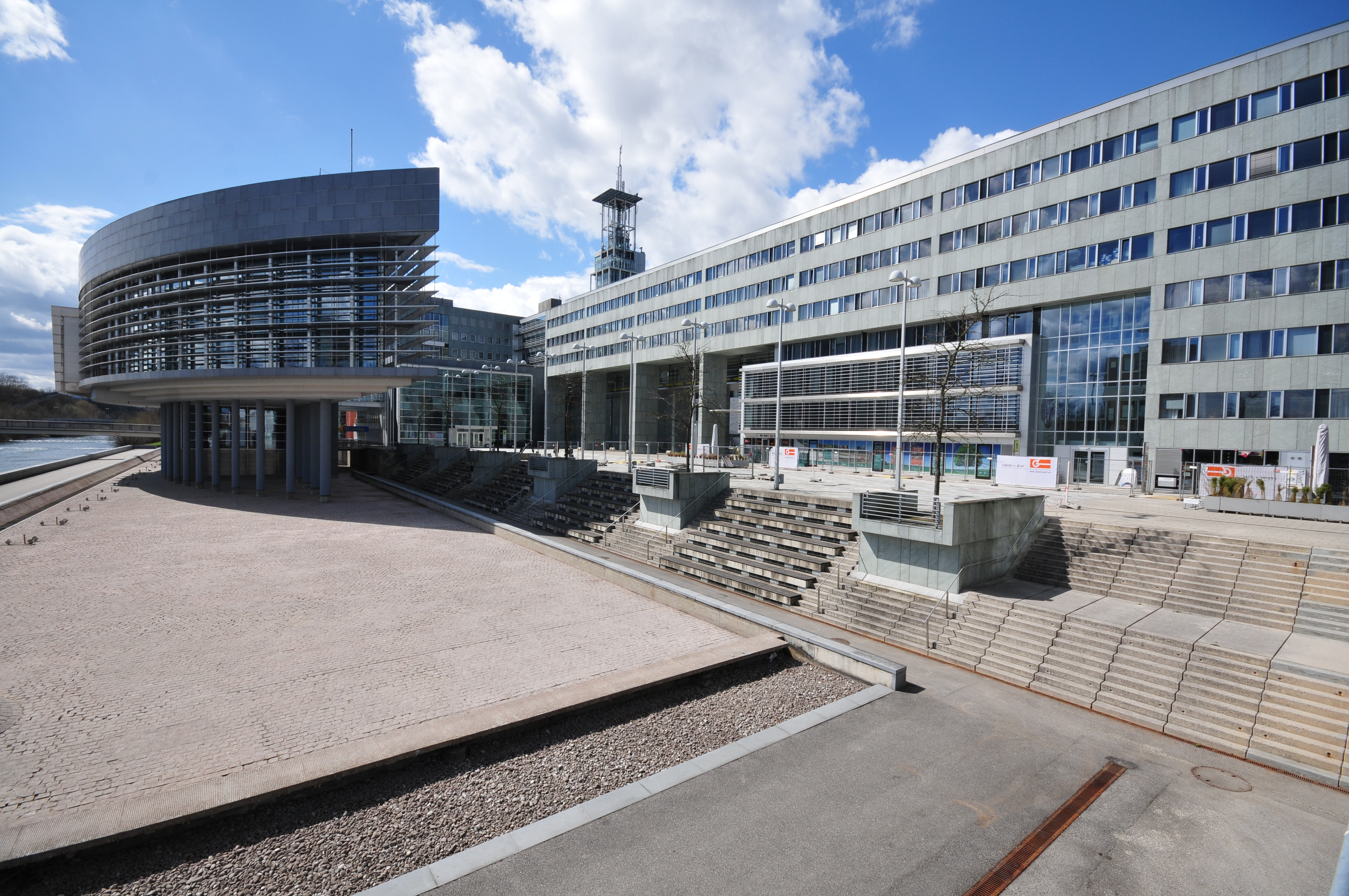
- From top down, left to right: Rathausplatz with Franciscan Church and Monastery, Sankt Pölten Cathedral, view of the city, City Hall, Lower Austrian Government Quarter

- Flag Coat of arms

- Location of St. Pölten within Lower Austria

- Location within Lower Austria Location within Austria
- Coordinates: 48°12′00″N 15°37′00″E
- Country: Austria
- State: Lower Austria
- District: Statutory city

Government
  - Mayor: Matthias Stadler (SPÖ)

Area
  - Total: 108.44 km^{2} (41.87 sq mi)
- Elevation: 267 m (876 ft)

Population (2025)
  - Total: 59,767
  - Density: 551.15/km^{2} (1,427.5/sq mi)
- Time zone: UTC+1 (CET)
  - Summer (DST): UTC+2 (CEST)
- Postal code: 3100, 3104, 3105, 3106, 3107, 3108, 3140, 3151, 3385
- Area code: 02742
- Vehicle registration: P
- Website: www.st-poelten.gv.at

Sankt Pölten (Austrian German pronunciation: [saŋkt ˈpœltn̩]; Central Bavarian: Sankt Pödn), mostly abbreviated to the official name St. Pölten, is the capital and largest city of the State of Lower Austria in northeast Austria, with 59,767 inhabitants as of 1 January 2025. St. Pölten is a city with its own statute (or Statutarstadt) and therefore it is both a municipality and a district in the Mostviertel. Due to its cultural status, it has recently enjoyed an increase of visitors passing through Sankt Pölten on their way to Vienna.

== Geography ==
The city lies on the Traisen river and is located north of the Alps and south of the Wachau. It is part of the Mostviertel, the southwest region of Lower Austria.

=== Subdistricts ===
St Pölten is divided into the following subdistricts: Altmannsdorf, Dörfl at Ochsenburg, Eggendorf, Ganzendorf, Hafing, Harland, Hart, Kreisberg, Matzersdorf, Mühlgang, Nadelbach, Oberradlberg, Oberwagram, Oberzwischenbrunn, Ochsenburg, Pengersdorf, Pottenbrunn, Pummersdorf, Ragelsdorf, Ratzersdorf at the Traisen, Reitzersdorf, Schwadorf, Spratzern, St Georgen on the Steinfelde, St Pölten, Stattersdorf, Steinfeld, Teufelhof, Unterradlberg, Unterwagram, Unterzwischenbrunn, Viehofen, Völtendorf, Waitzendorf, Wasserburg, Weitern, Wetzersdorf, Windpassing, Witzendorf, Wolfenberg, Wörth and Zwerndorf.

=== Transport ===
The city's main railway station, St. Pölten Hauptbahnhof, is located directly on the West railway of the ÖBB and is also the terminus of the Leobersdorfer Railway, the Mariazellerbahn, the regional railway to Tulln and the regional railway to Krems. It is at the intersection of the Western Motorway A1 and the Kremser Speedway S33, and is traversed by the Vienna Road B1. St Pölten is a junction of the Wieselbus bus lines, which provides radial connections between the capital and the different regions of Lower Austria.

==== In the city ====
Between 1911 and 1976, a tramline operated in St Pölten. Today, a network of eleven bus lines operates at regular intervals within the city. Every summer, a free tourist train in the city centre connects the ancient parts of the city with the government district.

=== Climate ===
Climate data for Sankt Pölten (1991–2020)
Month	Jan	Feb	Mar	Apr	May	Jun	Jul	Aug	Sep	Oct	Nov	Dec	Year
Record high °C (°F)	17.9 (64.2)	19.2 (66.6)	24.3 (75.7)	30.9 (87.6)	32.2 (90.0)	37.7 (99.9)	37.6 (99.7)	38.2 (100.8)	34.2 (93.6)	28.0 (82.4)	23.6 (74.5)	16.4 (61.5)	37.7 (99.9)
Mean daily maximum °C (°F)	2.5 (36.5)	5.3 (41.5)	10.0 (50.0)	16.5 (61.7)	20.1 (68.2)	24.5 (76.1)	25.7 (78.3)	25.4 (77.7)	20.5 (68.9)	13.8 (56.8)	7.9 (46.2)	3.2 (37.8)	14.6 (58.3)
Daily mean °C (°F)	0.2 (32.4)	1.7 (35.1)	6.0 (42.8)	11.0 (51.8)	15.4 (59.7)	19.0 (66.2)	20.9 (69.6)	20.6 (69.1)	15.8 (60.4)	10.5 (50.9)	5.3 (41.5)	1.0 (33.8)	10.6 (51.1)
Mean daily minimum °C (°F)	−2.2 (28.0)	−1.6 (29.1)	1.6 (34.9)	5.6 (42.1)	9.6 (49.3)	13.6 (56.5)	14.7 (58.5)	14.5 (58.1)	11.0 (51.8)	6.4 (43.5)	2.6 (36.7)	−1.2 (29.8)	6.2 (43.2)
Record low °C (°F)	−22.1 (−7.8)	−20.7 (−5.3)	−23.1 (−9.6)	−4.3 (24.3)	0.6 (33.1)	2.9 (37.2)	6.8 (44.2)	7.0 (44.6)	1.1 (34.0)	−6.9 (19.6)	−13.4 (7.9)	−20.0 (−4.0)	−23.1 (−9.6)
Average precipitation mm (inches)	31.8 (1.25)	25.9 (1.02)	45.5 (1.79)	45.4 (1.79)	93.7 (3.69)	105.7 (4.16)	102.8 (4.05)	101.4 (3.99)	74.5 (2.93)	50.9 (2.00)	41.1 (1.62)	33.7 (1.33)	752.4 (29.62)
Average snowfall cm (inches)	16 (6.3)	17 (6.7)	8 (3.1)	2 (0.8)	0 (0)	0 (0)	0 (0)	0 (0)	0 (0)	0 (0)	6 (2.4)	14 (5.5)	64 (25)
Average relative humidity (%) (at 14:00)	78.3	69.4	60.0	52.2	55.2	55.2	54.3	54.2	60.0	68.4	77.6	80.6	63.8
Mean monthly sunshine hours	60.0	92.0	146.3	203.0	230.9	243.7	253.3	251.7	179.6	123.8	62.6	50.3	1,897.2
Percentage possible sunshine	23.2	33.1	40.4	50.3	50.1	52.0	53.7	58.1	48.7	38.0	23.9	20.6	41.0
Source: Central Institute for Meteorology and Geodynamics (snowfall 1981-2010)

Climate data for Sankt Pölten (1971–2000)
Month	Jan	Feb	Mar	Apr	May	Jun	Jul	Aug	Sep	Oct	Nov	Dec	Year
Record high °C (°F)	16.2 (61.2)	19.2 (66.6)	25.6 (78.1)	27.3 (81.1)	30.8 (87.4)	34.9 (94.8)	37.0 (98.6)	38.2 (100.8)	33.8 (92.8)	26.9 (80.4)	23.4 (74.1)	14.6 (58.3)	38.2 (100.8)
Mean daily maximum °C (°F)	1.8 (35.2)	4.0 (39.2)	9.7 (49.5)	14.5 (58.1)	20.3 (68.5)	22.8 (73.0)	25.0 (77.0)	25.1 (77.2)	20.1 (68.2)	14.0 (57.2)	6.5 (43.7)	3.0 (37.4)	13.9 (57.0)
Daily mean °C (°F)	−1 (30)	0.4 (32.7)	4.7 (40.5)	8.9 (48.0)	14.3 (57.7)	17.2 (63.0)	19.1 (66.4)	18.9 (66.0)	14.5 (58.1)	9.1 (48.4)	3.5 (38.3)	0.4 (32.7)	9.2 (48.6)
Mean daily minimum °C (°F)	−3.3 (26.1)	−2.3 (27.9)	1.1 (34.0)	4.4 (39.9)	9.2 (48.6)	12.3 (54.1)	14.1 (57.4)	14.0 (57.2)	10.6 (51.1)	5.9 (42.6)	1.3 (34.3)	−1.7 (28.9)	5.5 (41.9)
Record low °C (°F)	−22.1 (−7.8)	−20.7 (−5.3)	−23.1 (−9.6)	−4.8 (23.4)	−0.9 (30.4)	2.4 (36.3)	6.8 (44.2)	5.6 (42.1)	1.3 (34.3)	−6.9 (19.6)	−13.4 (7.9)	−20 (−4)	−23.1 (−9.6)
Average precipitation mm (inches)	29.5 (1.16)	31.9 (1.26)	42.1 (1.66)	53.4 (2.10)	73.5 (2.89)	82.9 (3.26)	88.1 (3.47)	75.7 (2.98)	56.3 (2.22)	38.1 (1.50)	48.9 (1.93)	38.6 (1.52)	659.0 (25.94)
Average snowfall cm (inches)	18.1 (7.1)	16.5 (6.5)	10.1 (4.0)	4.0 (1.6)	0.0 (0.0)	0.0 (0.0)	0.0 (0.0)	0.0 (0.0)	0.0 (0.0)	0.1 (0.0)	7.4 (2.9)	17.1 (6.7)	73.3 (28.9)
Average precipitation days (≥ 1.0 mm)	7.2	7.2	7.9	8.5	9.2	10.5	10.7	9.0	7.6	6.5	9.0	8.1	101.4
Average relative humidity (%) (at 14:00)	76.7	69.1	58.0	52.5	50.7	53.8	52.7	51.1	57.4	63.8	75.7	79.2	61.7
Mean monthly sunshine hours	55.2	87.4	129.7	168.8	224.6	221.9	234.9	232.5	165.8	118.3	58.8	45.4	1,743.3
Percentage possible sunshine	22.3	33.6	38.7	44.4	50.7	49.3	51.4	55.5	47.6	38.6	23.2	19.3	39.6
Source: Central Institute for Meteorology and Geodynamics

== History ==
The oldest part of the city is built on the site of the ancient Roman city of Aelium Cetium that existed between the 2nd and the 4th century AD. A Benedictine monastery was founded in 791; in the year 799, it was called Treisma. St Pölten did not become a town until 1050, and officially became a city in 1169. Until 1494, St Pölten was part of the diocese of Passau, and then became the property of the state. In 1081 it hosted the Augustinian Chorherren, and in 1784 their Kollegiatsstift closed. Since 1785, this building has hosted the cathedral of St Pölten. The city replaced Vienna as the capital of Lower Austria with a resolution by the Lower Austrian parliament on 10 July 1986. The Lower Austrian government has been hosted in St Pölten since 1997.

The name Sankt Pölten is derived from St. Hippolytus of Rome (a martyred early Church Father). The city was renamed to Sankt Hippolyt, then clipped to St Polyt, and finally St Pölten.

Largest groups of foreign residents
Nationality	Population (2026)
Syria	1,556
Turkey	1,303
Romania	1,214
Ukraine	930
Hungary	854
Afghanistan	851
Bosnia and Herzegovina	782
Russian Federation	749
Germany	700
North Macedonia	602
Serbia	350
Croatia	334
Slovakia	309
Kosovo	301
Poland	250
Iraq	167
Italy	173
Iran	157
Bulgaria	122
Czech Republic	99
Slovenia	37

== Politics ==
Municipal council and City's senate (Outdated as of 2021)

=== Municipal council ===
The municipal council (Gemeinderat) consists of 45 members. Since the 2026 local elections, it is made up of the following parties:

- Social Democratic Party of Austria (SPÖ): 19 seats
- Austrian People's Party (ÖVP): 9 seats
- Freedom Party of Austria (FPÖ): 8 seats
- The Greens - The Green Alternative (GRÜNE): 4 seats
- NEOS - The New Austria and Liberal Forum (NEOS): 1 seat
- Communist Party of Austria (KPÖ): 1 seat

The current mayor of the city, Matthias Stadler, was first elected by the municipal council in 2004.

=== City's senate ===
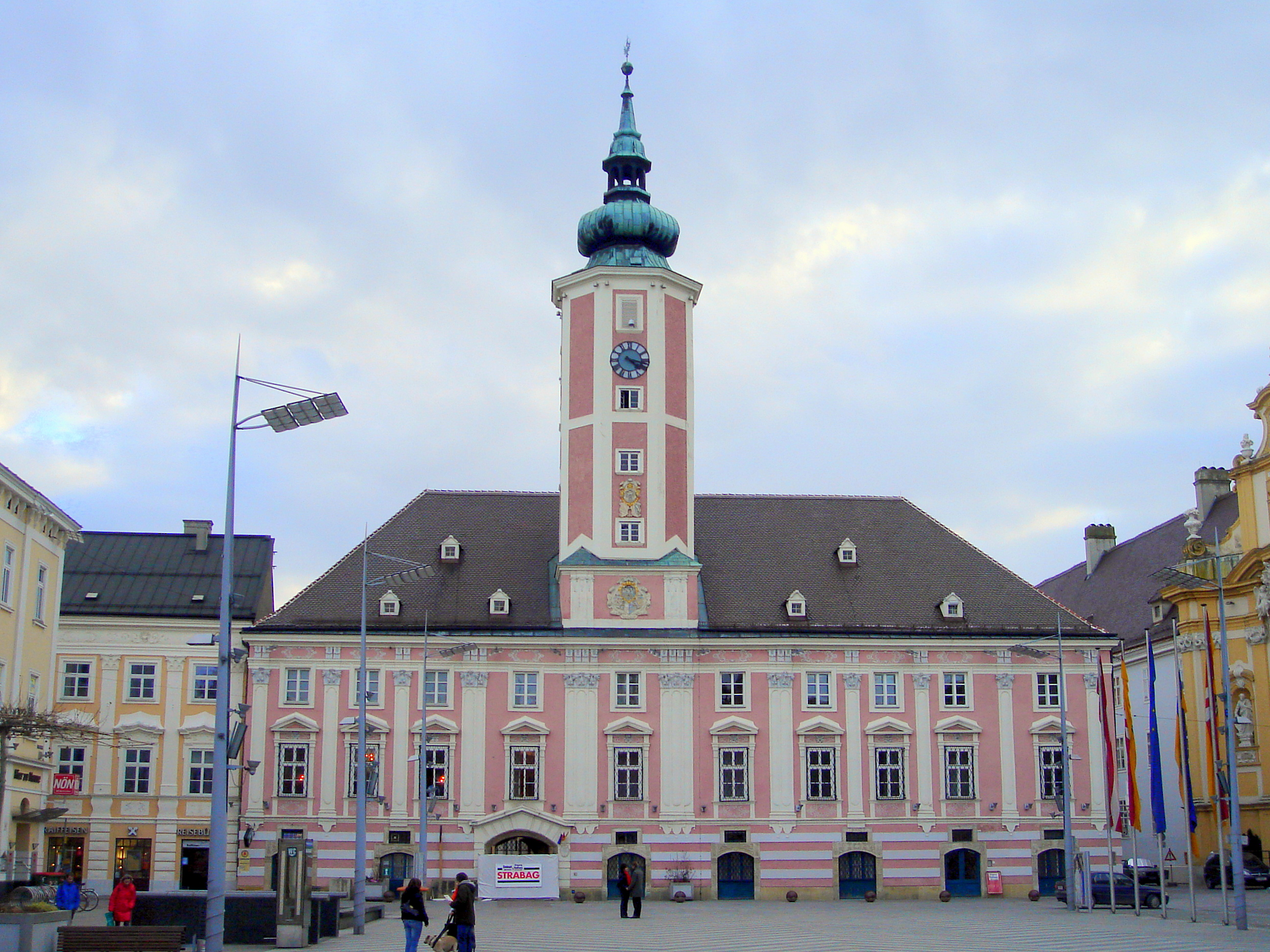
The town hall

The City's senate (Stadtsenat) consists of 13 members. It is chaired by the mayor. The other members—two vice-mayors and eleven town councillors—are appointed by the municipal council, with party affiliations according to the election results.

- Mayor Matthias Stadler (SPÖ)
- Deputy Mayor Harald Ludwig (SPÖ)
- Deputy Mayor Matthias Adl (ÖVP)
- Councillor: Ewald Buschenreiter (SPÖ)
- Councillor: Dietmar Fenz (SPÖ)
- Councillor: Renate Gamsjäger (SPÖ)
- Councillor: Heinz Hauptmann (SPÖ)
- Councillor: Ingrid Heihs (SPÖ)
- Councillor: Walter Hobiger (SPÖ)
- Councillor: Gabriele Vavra (SPÖ)
- Councillor: Mario Burger (ÖVP)
- Councillor: Florian Krumböck (ÖVP)
- Councillor: Klaus Otzelberger (FPÖ)
- Councillor: Christina Engel-Unterberger (GRÜNE)

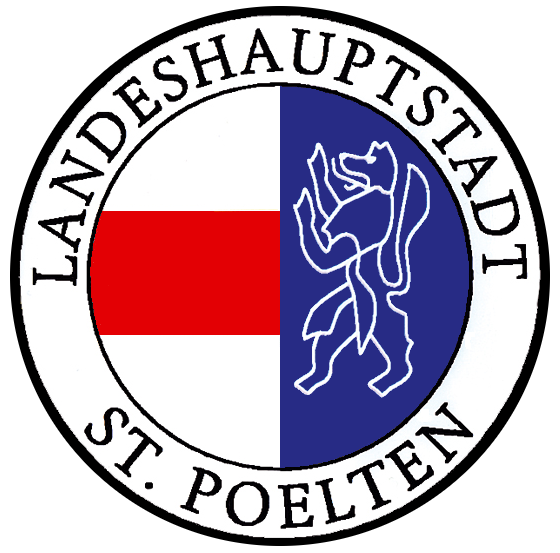
The city's Seal

=== Coat of arms, colours and seals ===
The arms' blazon is silver and azure; on the right a fess gules, on the left a wolf rampant silver langued gules and armed Or.

The colours of the city are red and yellow. The seal of the city contains its coat of arms surrounded by the text Landeshauptstadt St. Pölten. The administration's seal of the magistrate also contains the city's coat of arms with the text Magistrat der Stadt St. Pölten.

== Economy ==
As of 15 May 2001, 40,041 people worked in 2,711 companies in the city. 23 of those companies are large-scale enterprises with more than 200 employees each.

=== Media ===
Several media companies are based in St Pölten. These are "@cetera", a literary-cultural magazine; "City-Flyer", an online magazine describing the cultural offerings of the city, which is published on paper monthly; "Campus Radio", a radio station from the University of Applied Sciences; "HiT FM", a radio station broadcasting in Lower Austria; "LetHereBeRock", an online youth magazine about the alternative rock scene; NÖN, a Lower Austrian newspaper; the Austrian Broadcasting Corporation for Lower Austria; and the local television channel "P3tv".

=== Large-scale enterprises ===
The largest companies based in St Pölten are the furniture producer Leiner, the paper manufacturer Salzer, and the family owned engineering conglomerate Voith.

=== Transport ===
The nearest airport is Vienna Airport, which is located 87 km (54 mi) southeast of St Pölten. It can easily be accessed by train operated by Railjet and road.

== Public facilities ==
=== Educational facilities ===
- Bundesgymnasium and Bundesrealgymnasium St. Pölten (public gymnasium)
- Public educational facility for kindergarten pedagogy and social pedagogy
- Public economics school and economics academy
- Bundesreal- and Bundesoberstufenrealgymnasium (BORG) Schulring (public high-level gymnasium)
- St. Pölten University of Applied Sciences (fields: computer simulation, media management, social work, telecommunication and media)
- Public higher educational facility for professions in economics and school for social professions
- Public higher technical educational facility and laboratory (fields: EDP and organisation, electronics, electrical engineering, machine engineering, economic engineering) with university of applied sciences for machine construction
- New Design University (interior architecture and graphics design)
- Lower Austrian state academy
- Philosophical-theological university
- Folk high school
- Lower Austrian institute for promotion of economy development (WIFI)

=== Leisure and sports sites ===
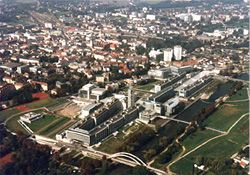
Aerial photo

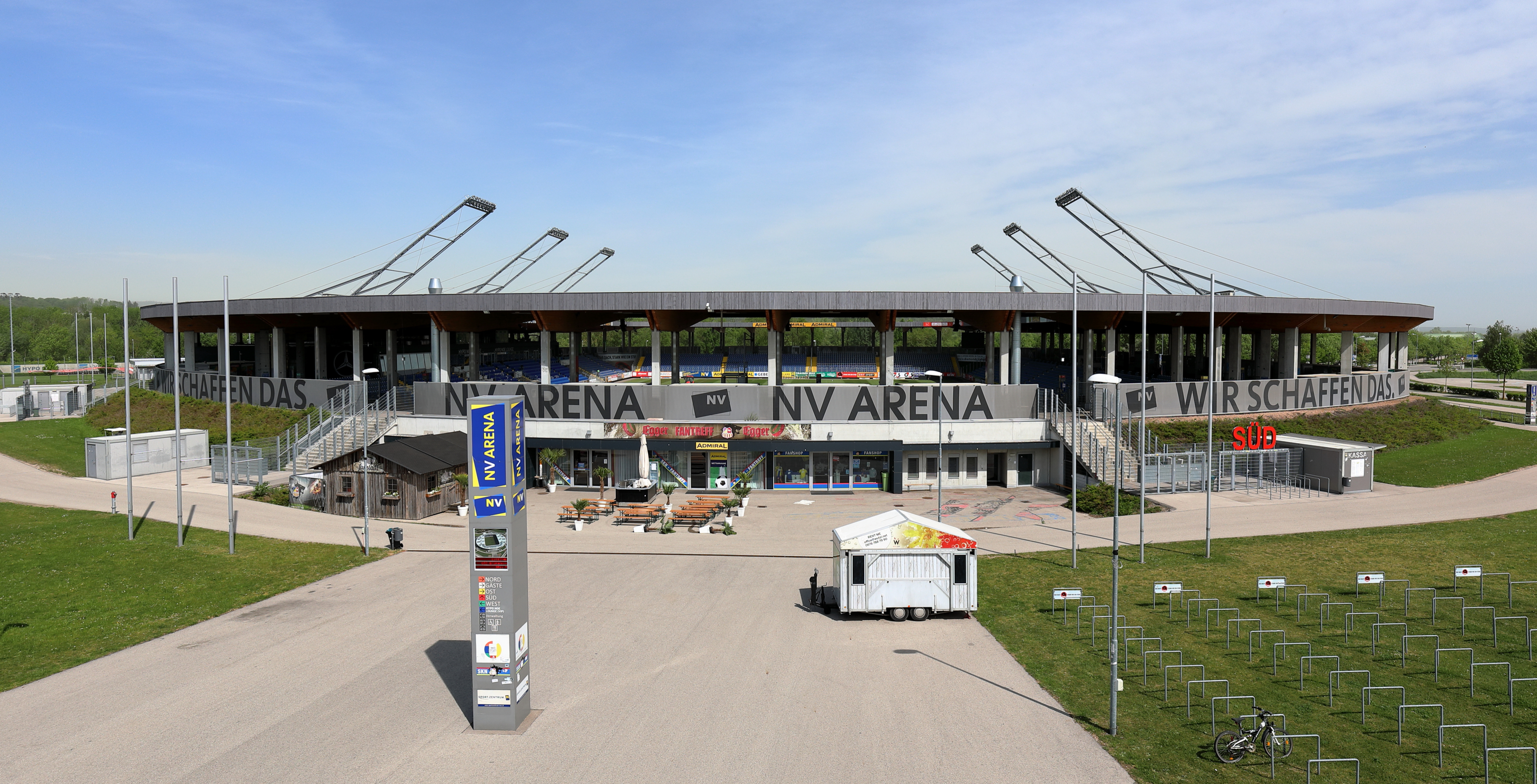
NV Arena

Swimming is available at Aquacity (indoor swimming pool), the St. Pölten outdoor swimming pool and Ratzersdorf Lake (a bathing pond where a nudist beach, beach volleyball, and miniature golf are available). For fitness training there is the City-Treff - Pueblo, the Lifeline, the Reebok and the Seepark. In addition, the city has:

- American football Club – St. Pölten Invaders
- Badminton Club
- Golf club St. Pölten
- Skittles at the leisure park Megafun
- Miniature golf at the Tennis-Allround Center
- Model aircraft airport of the BSV VOITH
- Riding club St. Pölten-Wagram
- Shooting range of the private Schützenkompagnie
- Skatepark
- Gliding club St. Pölten

St Pölten hosts a primary base of the Lower Austrian state sports school.

==== Tennis ====
Every year in the third week of May an ATP 250 tournament takes place in St Pölten. There are multiple local tennis stadiums, including the Arena im Aufeld, the tennis centre Allround, the tennis courts by the local ice sport association 1872, the courts in St. Georgen, the courts at the Ratzersdorfer Pond, the courts in the Lower Austrian state sports school and the courts of the leisure park Megafun.

== International relations ==
=== Twin towns/sister cities ===
St Pölten is twinned with the following cities:

- Altoona, Pennsylvania, United States (since 2000)
- Brno, South Moravian Region, Czech Republic (since 1990)
- Clichy, Hauts-de-Seine, Île-de-France, France (since 1968)
- Heidenheim, Baden-Württemberg, Germany (since 1967)
- Kurashiki, Okayama Prefecture, Japan (since 1957)
- Wuhan, Hubei, China (since 2005)

== Culture and objects of interest ==
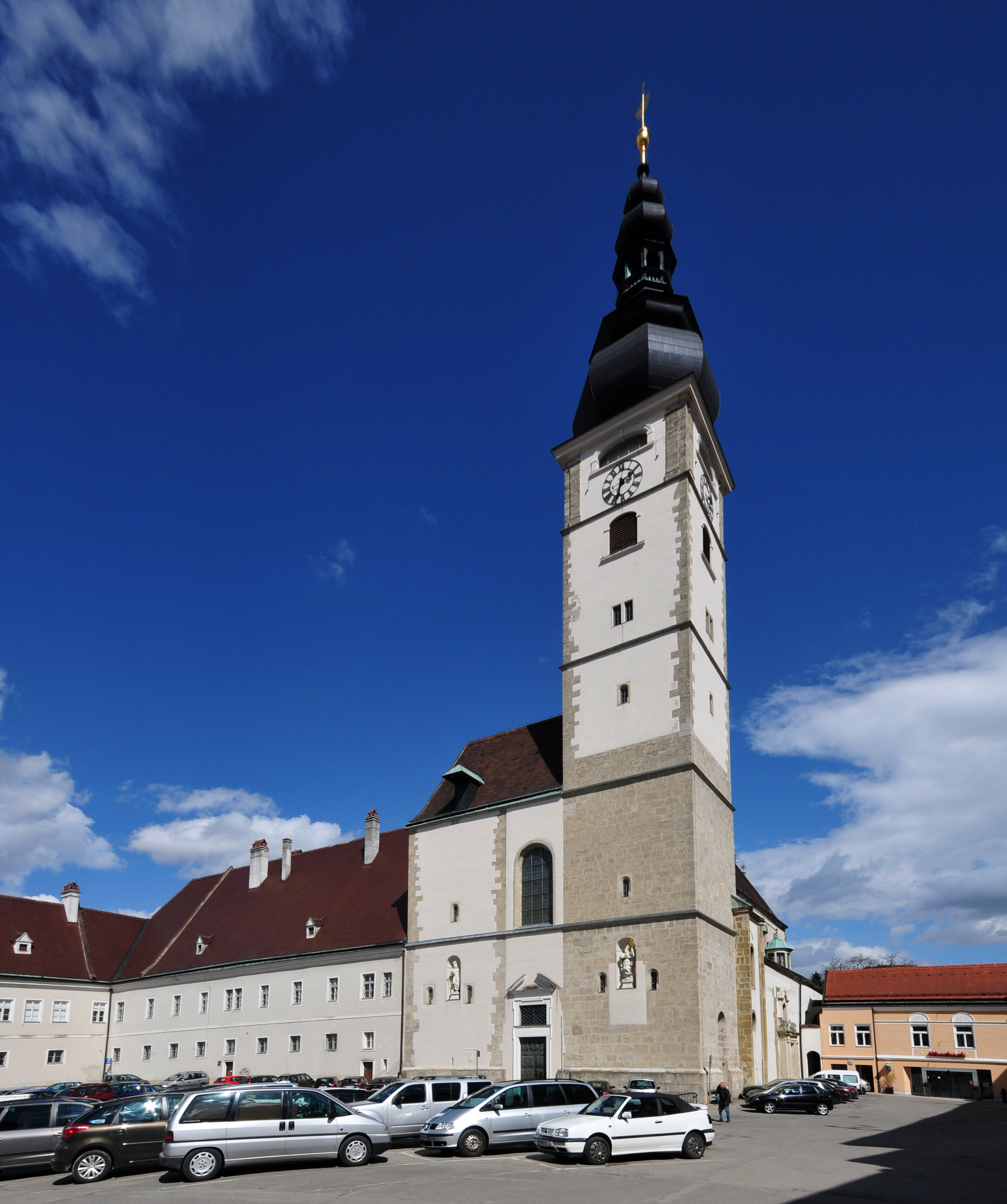
Sankt Pölten Cathedral

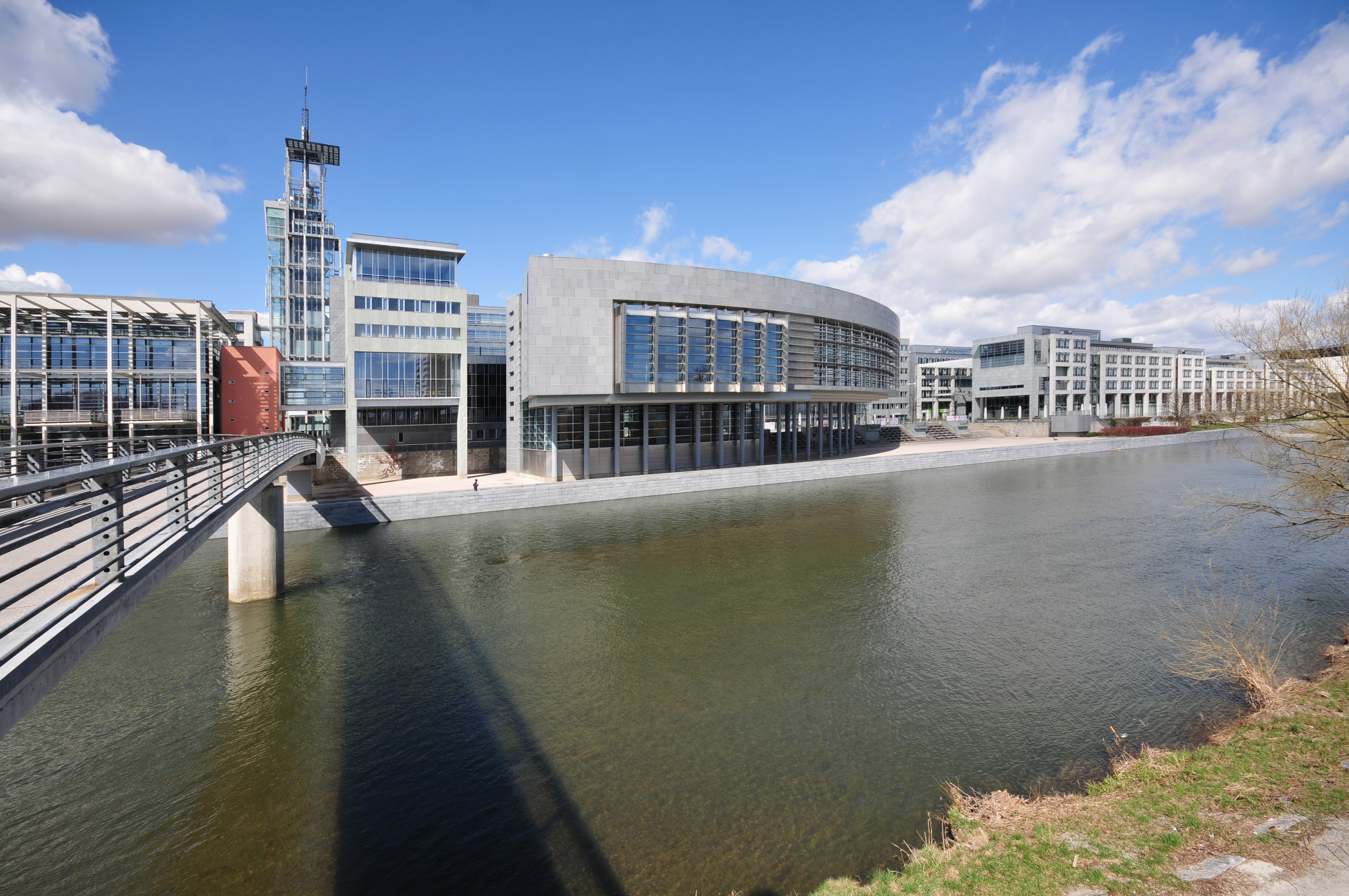
State administrative building

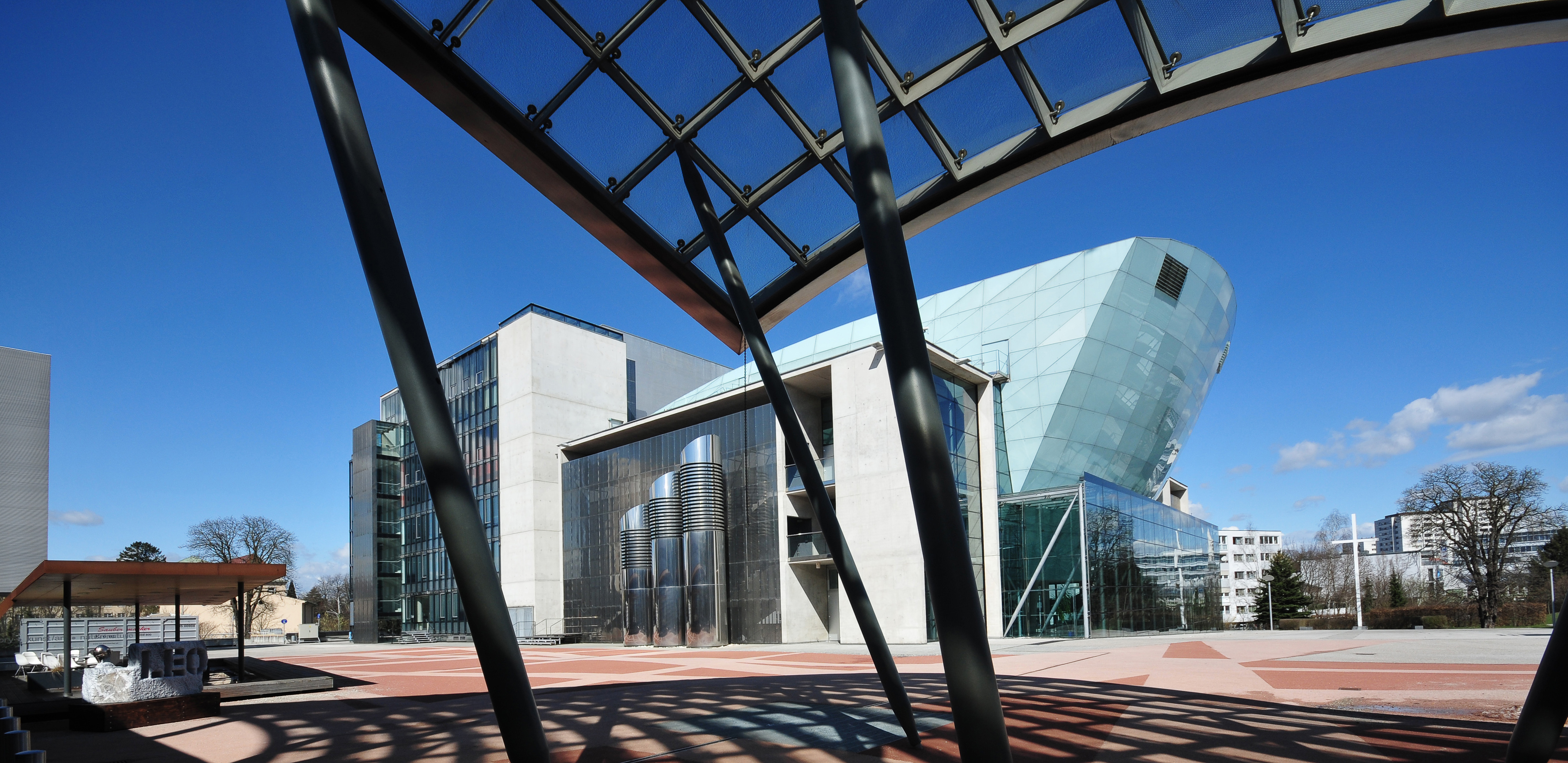
Theatre

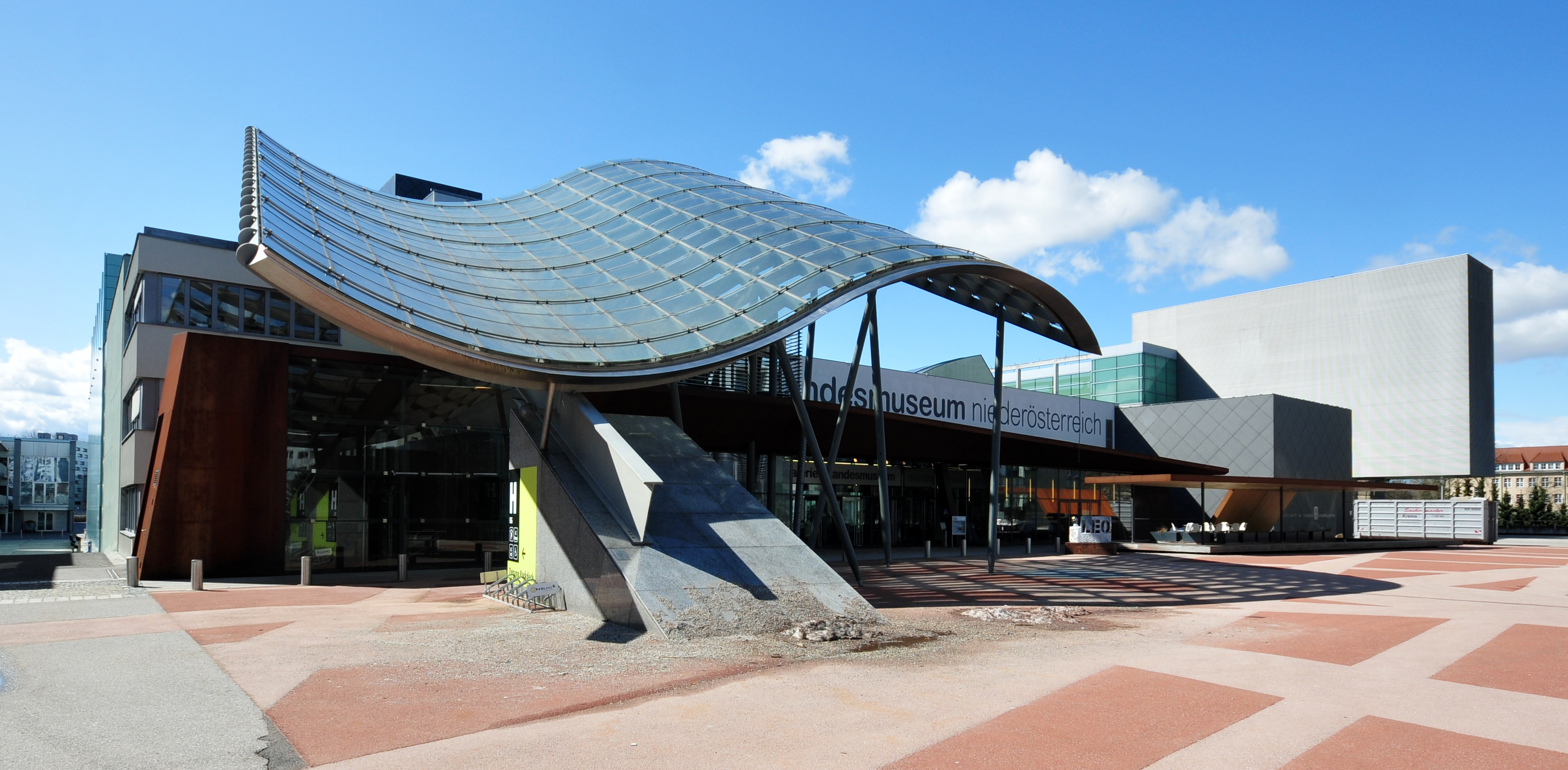
State Museum

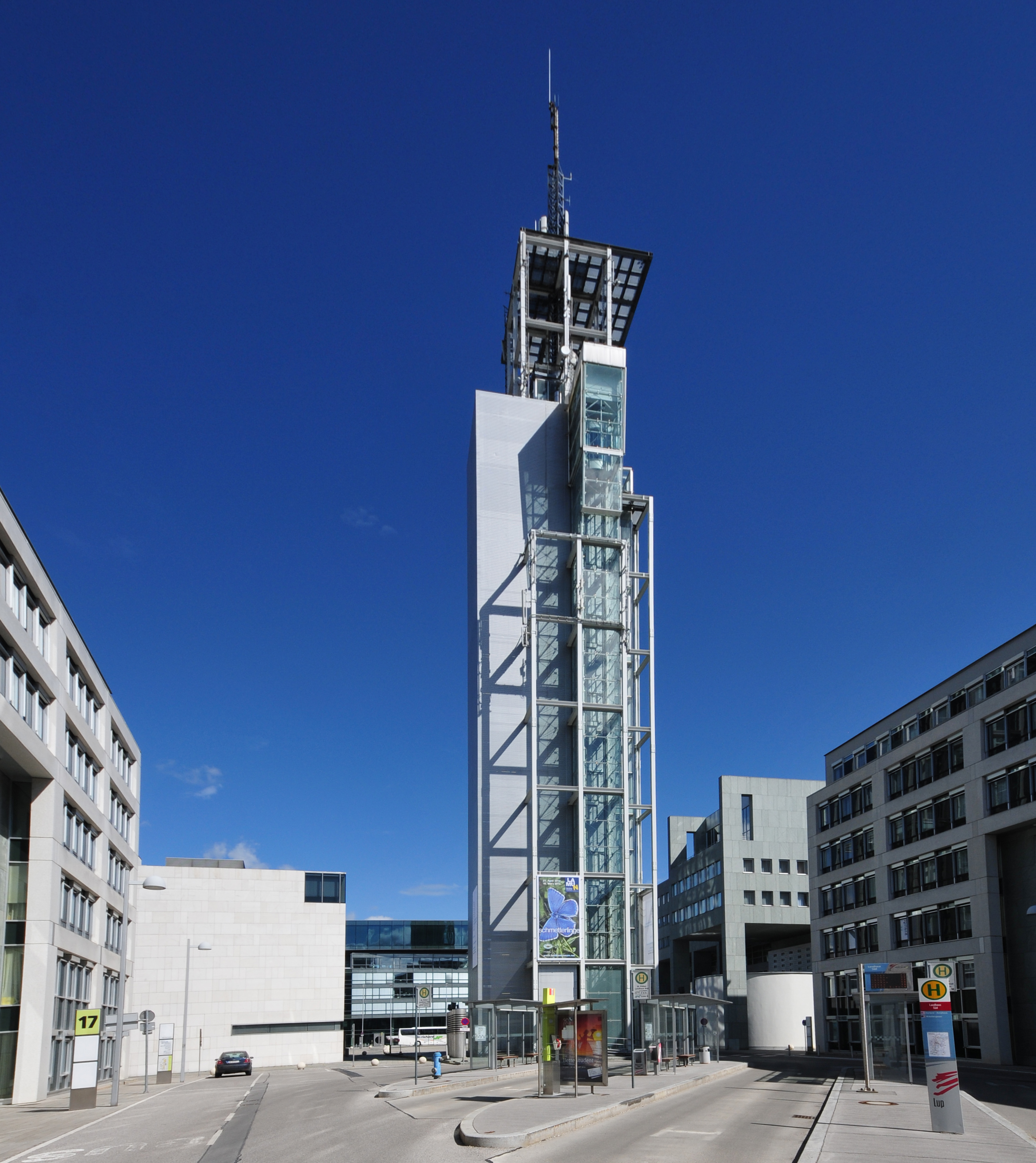
Klangturm

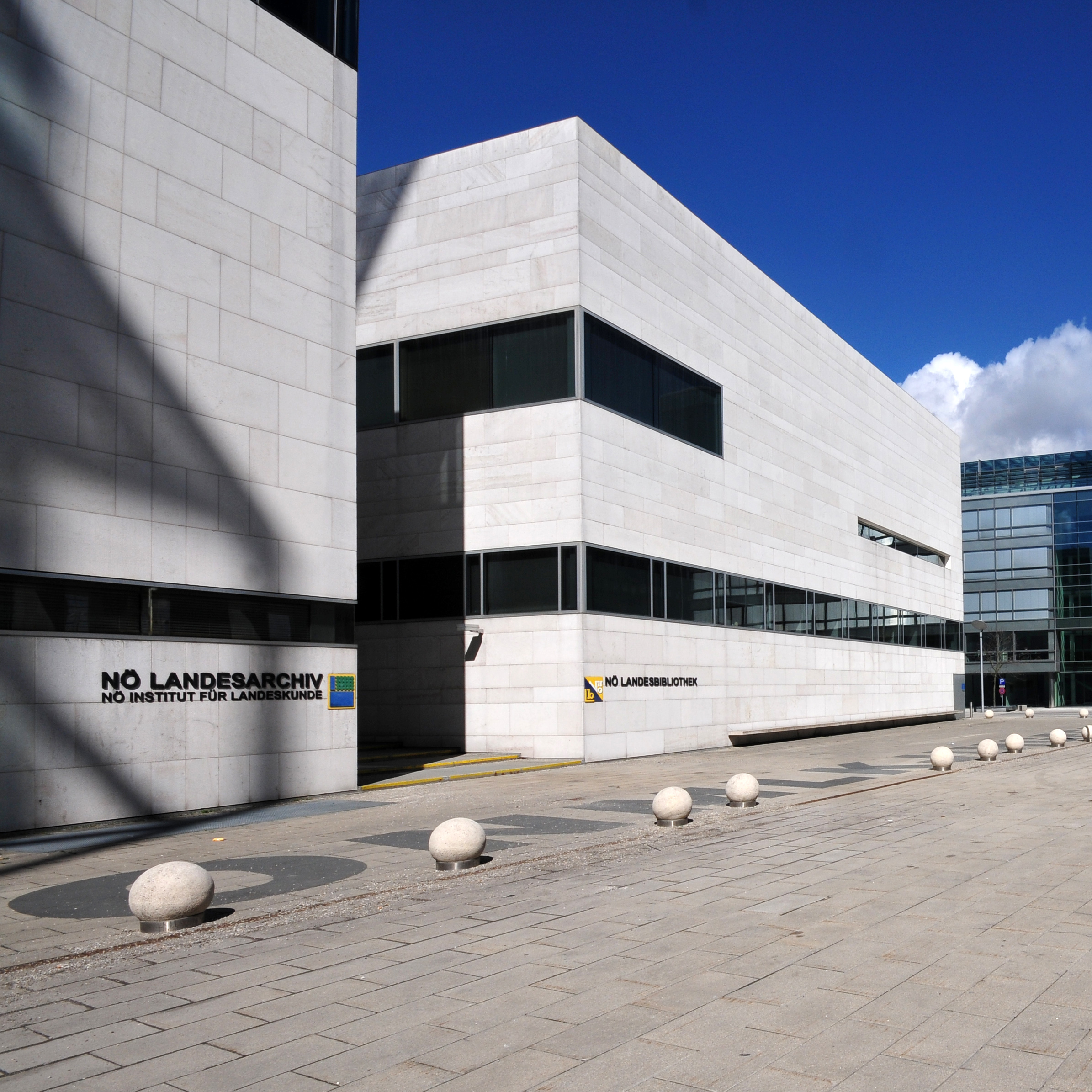
State Library

=== Theatres ===
- Lower Austrian state theatre
- Bühne im Hof
- Festspielhaus St. Pölten

=== Museums ===
- Diocese museum St. Pölten
- Museum im Hof
- Lower Austrian state museum
- Lower Austrian documentation institute for modern art
- Private museum "Wilhelmsburger ornament and utensil dishes"
- City museum St. Pölten

=== Others ===
- Repertory theatre Cinema Paradiso
- Former synagogue
- Klangturm (tower), the city's landmark
- Stadtsäle (public event hall)
- Youth culture hall frei.raum
- VAZ (Veranstaltungszentrum, event-centre)
- Underground, a pub in the inner city
- Tonkünstler Orchestra
- Business Center Niederösterreich
- Apotheke zum goldenen Löwen (pharmacy since 1545), oldest shop in town, famous baroque facing

=== Regular events ===
- ATP tennis tournament
- Cinema at the cathedral (Film am Dom)
- Capital city festival
- International culture and film festival
- Parliament festival
- St Pölten festival weeks "Klangweile"
- St Pölten Höfefest
- FM4 Frequency Festival
- Pro Golf Tour tournament

== Notable people ==
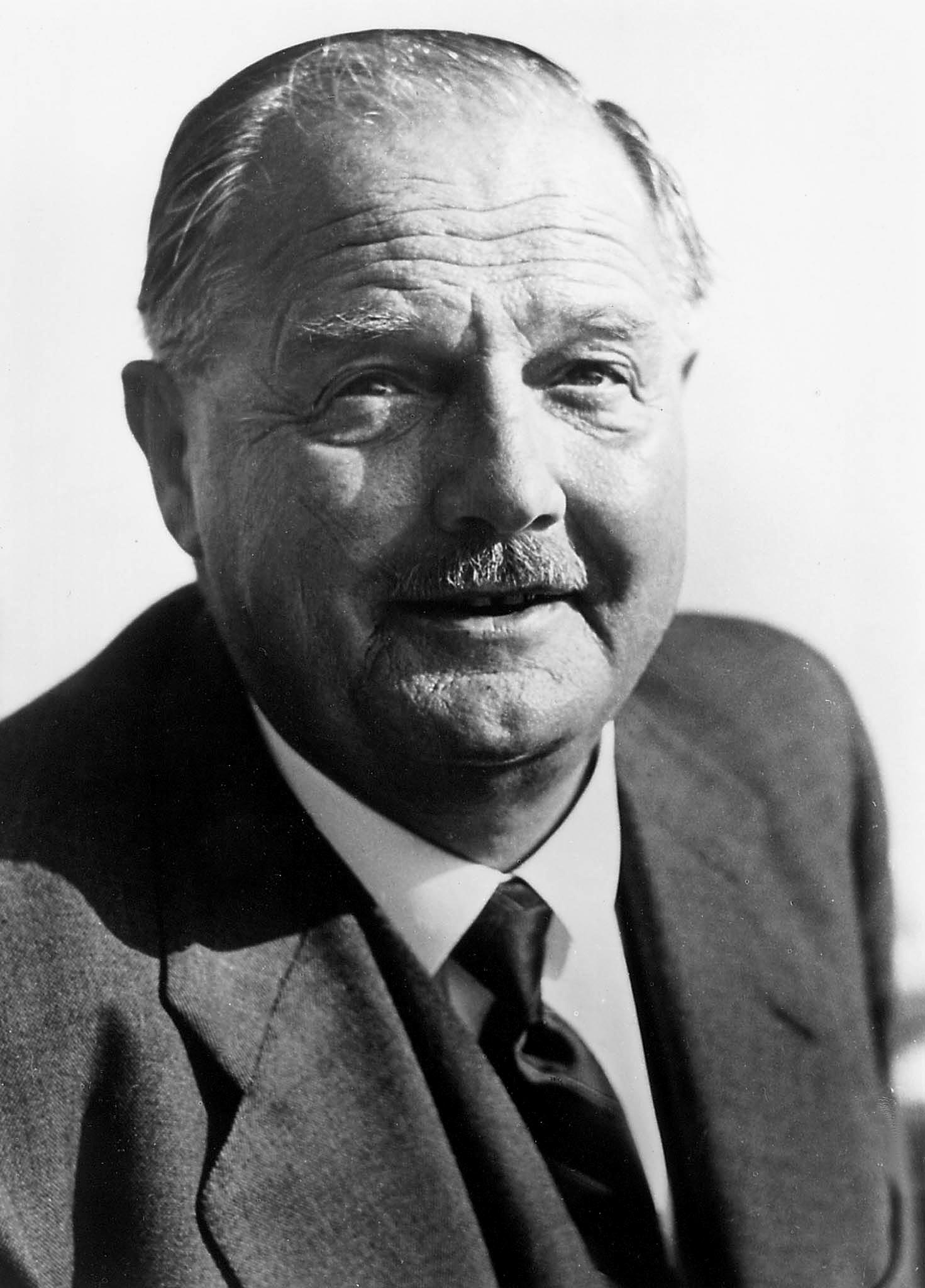
Julius Raab, 1961

- Jakob Prandtauer (1660–1726), Austrian Baroque architect, died locally
- Ernst Stöhr (1860–1917), painter, graphic artist, writer and founding member of the Vienna Secession
- Julius Raab, (1891–1964), conservative politician, Chancellor of Austria, 1953–1961
- Walter Fischer (1901–1978), medical doctor, journalist, radio broadcaster, poet and resistance fighter
- Maria Emhart (1901–1981), resistance activist, survived the Hitler years and became a national politician (SPÖ)
- Otto Demus (1902–1990), art historian and Byzantinist; member of the Vienna School of Art History
- Walter Graf (1903–1982), musicologist
- Heinrich Maier (1908–1945), priest and resistance fighter against Nazi Germany, attended local gymnasium
- Bernhard Wicki (1919–2000), Austrian-Swiss actor, film director and screenwriter
- Karl Österreicher (1923–1995), conductor, music educator, died locally
- Peter Minich (1927–2013), stage actor who became a tenor performing in operas, operettas and musical films
- Jörg Demus, (1928–2019), Austrian classical pianist
- Lolita (1931–2010), singer and actress
- Erwin Leder, (born 1951), actor e.g. Das Boot & Underworld
- Alfred Gusenbauer, (born 1960), politician (SPÖ) and former Chancellor of Austria, 2007/2008
- Martin Fiala, (DE Wiki) (born 1961), Austrian composer
- Oliver Stummvoll (born 1995), model
- The Clairvoyants (founded 2011), (Thommy Ten and Amélie van Tass) magician and mentalist duo

=== Sport ===
- Franz Binder (1911–1989), footballer and coach; played 242 games and 28 for Austria & Germany
- Karl Daxbacher (born 1953), football manager and player; played 393 games for FK Austria Wien & 6 for Austria
- Jochen Fallmann (born 1979), football coach and a former player who played over 450 games
- Markus Wagesreiter (born 1982), handball player who has played 134 games for Austria
- Lukas Mössner (born 1984), footballer who played over 370 games
- Maria Gstöttner (born 1984), football striker, played 467 games for SV Neulengbach and also for Austria women
- Benjamin Karl (born 1985), snowboarder with medals from three Winter Olympics

== Literature ==
- Klaus Nüchtern: Kleines Gulasch in St. Pölten (German): ISBN 3-85439-306-7
- Thomas Karl: St. Pölten – Ein Wandel durch die Zeit (German): ISBN 3-89702-641-4
- Otto Kapfinger, Michaela Steiner: St. Pölten neu (German): ISBN 3-211-82954-7
