= Anton Afritsch =

Austrian politician and journalist (1873–1924)

Anton Afritsch (8 December 1873 in Klagenfurt – 7 July 1924 in Graz) was an Austrian journalist and politician. He is best remembered as the initiator of the Kinderfreunde movement.

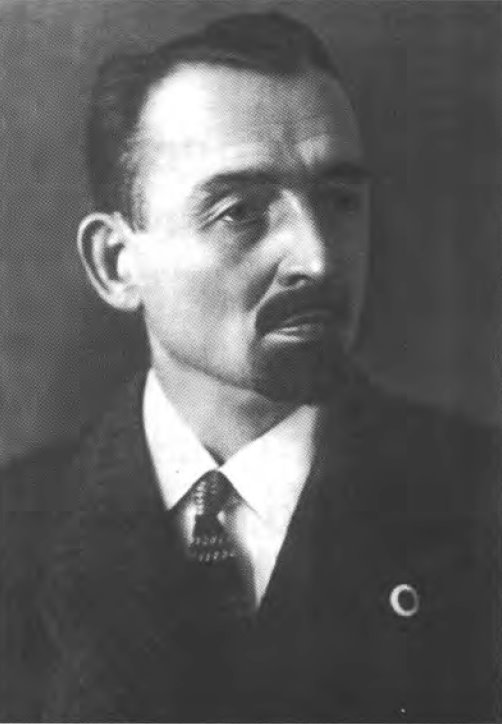
