= Emmy Stradal =

Austrian politician (1877–1925)

Member of the Parliament
- In office 1920–1923

Personal details
- Born: Emilie Maria Sofie Ecker; 28 October 1877 Wolkersdorf, Cisleithania
- Died: 1925 (aged 47–48)
- Party: German People's Party

Emmy Stradal (née Ecker; 1877–1925) was an Austrian housewife-turned-politician and a feminist. Being a member of the German People's Party she served at the Parliament. She was among the early supporters of girls' education in Austria.

== Biography ==
She was born Emilie Maria Sofie Ecker in Wolkersdorf on 28 October 1877. Her father Michael Ecker was a notary in Stockerau, and through her mother, Adele Ecker, she was related to the Moravian journalist Emil Pindter. She attended elementary and public schools in Stockerau. On 11 August 1896, at the age of only nineteen, she married Adalbert Stradal, who was sixteen years her senior and came from a German-Bohemian family. They had four children: Hedwig, Hermann, Albert and Otto.

Stradal was part of the middle-class women's movement. She joined the People’s Party at the early period of the First Austrian Republic and represented the party at the Parliament between 1920 and 1923. She contributed to the efforts of Therese Schlesinger in relation to female students' access to boys’ high schools and higher education. Stradal also argued that women’s secondary schools should be established and that private girls’ schools should be made public schools. Her first proposal was legalized with a ministerial decree dated 30 July 1921. She died in 1925.

== See also ==
- List of members of the Austrian Parliament who died in office
