= Otto Felix Kanitz =

Austrian socialist, journalist and educator

Kanitz in about 1922.

Otto Felix Kanitz ( 5 February 1894, in Vienna; 29 March 1940, in Buchenwald) was an Austrian socialist, journalist and educator. He was also part of the 'Schönbrunner Circle' (Schönbrunner Kreis).

== Childhood ==
Kanitz was born as the third of four children of Jewish parents. After his parents divorced in 1902, the three sons stayed with the father whilst the daughter was adjudged to the mother. When the father converted to Catholicism and took a catholic wife, one year later, the sons were baptized as well, but soon given to an orphanage in order to not disturb their stepmother. Young Kanitz had five years of primary school and three years of secondary school before starting an apprenticeship.

== Social activity ==
As soon as in 1911, he engaged in Max Winter's election campaign, and beginning in 1912 he gave speeches before youth groups. From 1916, he was active in the Kinderfreunde movement where he was mentored by Hermine Weinreb and Anton Afritsch. Besides his involvement in the aforementioned movement, he prepared matura, wrote poems and theater plays and contributed to the Kinderland journal. In 1918, after his matura, he was employed by Kinderfreunde and started to study philosophy and pedagogy with Wilhelm Jerusalem who considerably influenced his development towards tolerance, whilst strongly opposing institutionalized religion and any misuse of power. His goal was to eradicate the 'Dienermentalität' (servant mentality) which he felt was a characteristic of those of the supposed lower-classes under the Habsburg Monarchy. He had the opportunity to realize practical educational reforms together with Alfred Adler, Max Adler, Marianne Pollak, Josef Luitpold Stern and Otto Glöckel.

Kanitz was a proponent of the Kinderrepublik, an anti-authoritarian education movement. After successfully running two such holiday camps in 1919, in Gmünd, Lower Austria (the only such project ever to operate in Austria, which housed a total of some 700 children), he was appointed director of Kinderfreunde's newly to be founded Schönbrunn school:

When after the breakdown of the Habsburg monarchy Vienna's Vice Mayor Max Winter succeeded in getting a considerable part of Schönbrunn Palace to establish a school for educators and teachers and a children's home, it was under the condition that they would start a project within a time period of three days.

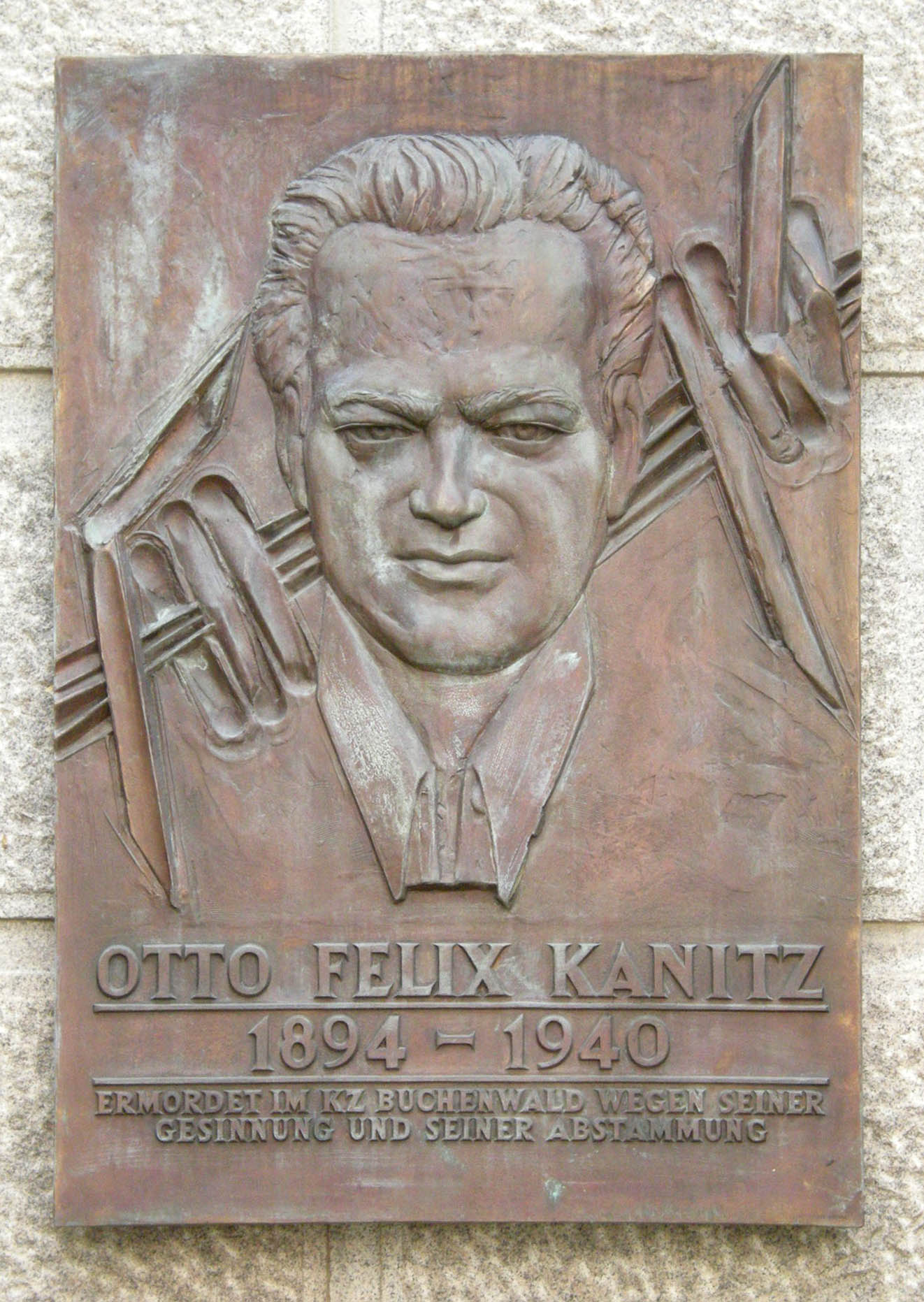
Kanitz memorial plaque at the outside of the Parliament building, Vienna.

Kanitz then moved in with 100 of the participants from the holiday camp.

Anton Tesarek was appointed director of the children's home in Schönbrunn Palace, while Kanitz was to lead the school. Meanwhile, Kranitz completed his PhD in 1922. Another one of his initiatives, a conference near Salzburg in 1922 with the co-founder of the German Kinderfreunde Kurt Löwenstein, resulted in founding the International Falcon Movement.

== Second World War time ==
From 1932 to 1934, Kanitz was a member of the Federal Council of Austria. Kranitz's pamphlet Kämpfer der Zukunft was banned by the Nazi beginning with their first book burnings in 1933. He was one of the many socialist authors of the inter-war period who were forced to move out of Austria after the 1934 anti-socialist crackdown. It is taken for granted that sooner or later he returned to Austria out of home-sickness. Being a Jew and a prominent socialist, he was taken into custody in November 1938 and sent to Buchenwald concentration camp where he is believed to have been executed.

A plaque dedicated to Kanitz has been placed on the back of the Austrian Parliament Building in Vienna, and a street in Vienna's 23. district bears his name. Whether the grave with his name really contains his ashes is uncertain.

== Primary and Secondary Literature ==
- Kanitz, Otto Felix: Kämpfer der Zukunft. Für eine sozialistische Erziehung. Vienna 1929. Herausgegeben von Lutz von Werder. Frankfurt/M: März Verlag 1970.
- Kanitz, Otto Felix: Das proletarische Kind in der bürgerlichen Gesellschaft. Jena 1925. Herausgegeben von Lutz von Werder. Frankfurt: Fischer Taschenbuch 1974. ISBN 3-436-01852-X.
- Kanitz, Otto Felix: Schönbrunn. In: Die Sozialistische Erziehung (Wien) Jg.2 (1922) S. 259-265.
- Kanitz, Otto Felix: Zehn Jahre Kolonie Gmünd. In: Die Sozialistische Erziehung (Wien) 9.Jg. (1929) S.198.
- Kotlan-Werner, Henriette: Otto Felix Kanitz und der Schönbrunner Kreis. Die Arbeitsgemeinschaft sozialistischer Erzieher 1923-1934. Wien: Europaverlag 1982 (Materialien zur Arbeiterbewegung 21).
- Jakob Bindel (editor): 75 (Fünfundsiebzig) Jahre Kinderfreunde: 1908-1983; Skizzen, Erinnerungen, Berichte, Ausblicke. Verlag Jungbrunnen, Wien-München 1983. ISBN 3-7026-5536-0
- Herbert Gantschacher: Witness and Victim of the Apocalypse ARBOS 2007. Chapter 13 page 12 and chapter 14 page 6.
