= Alois Hans Schram =

Austrian painter

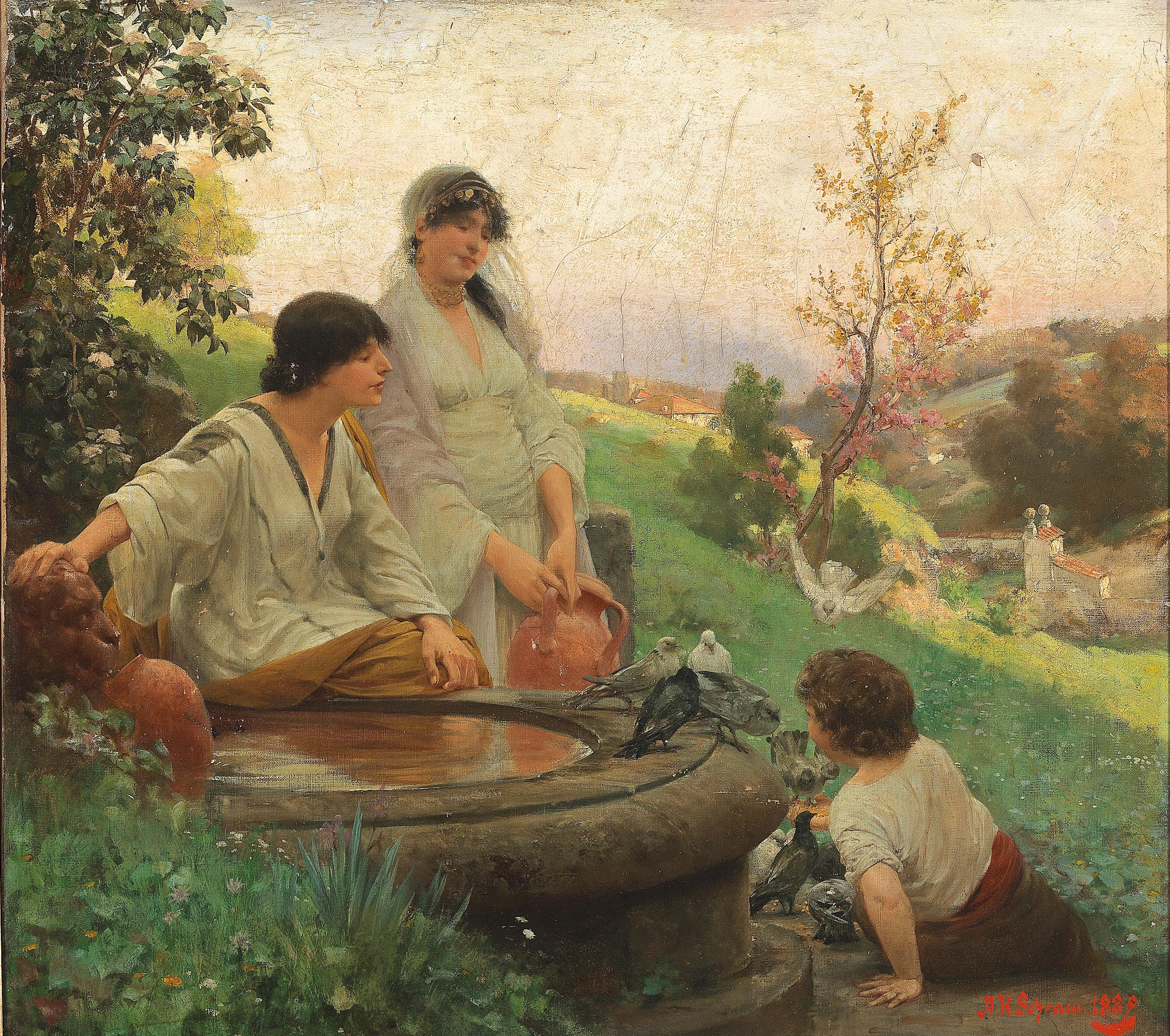
At the fountain

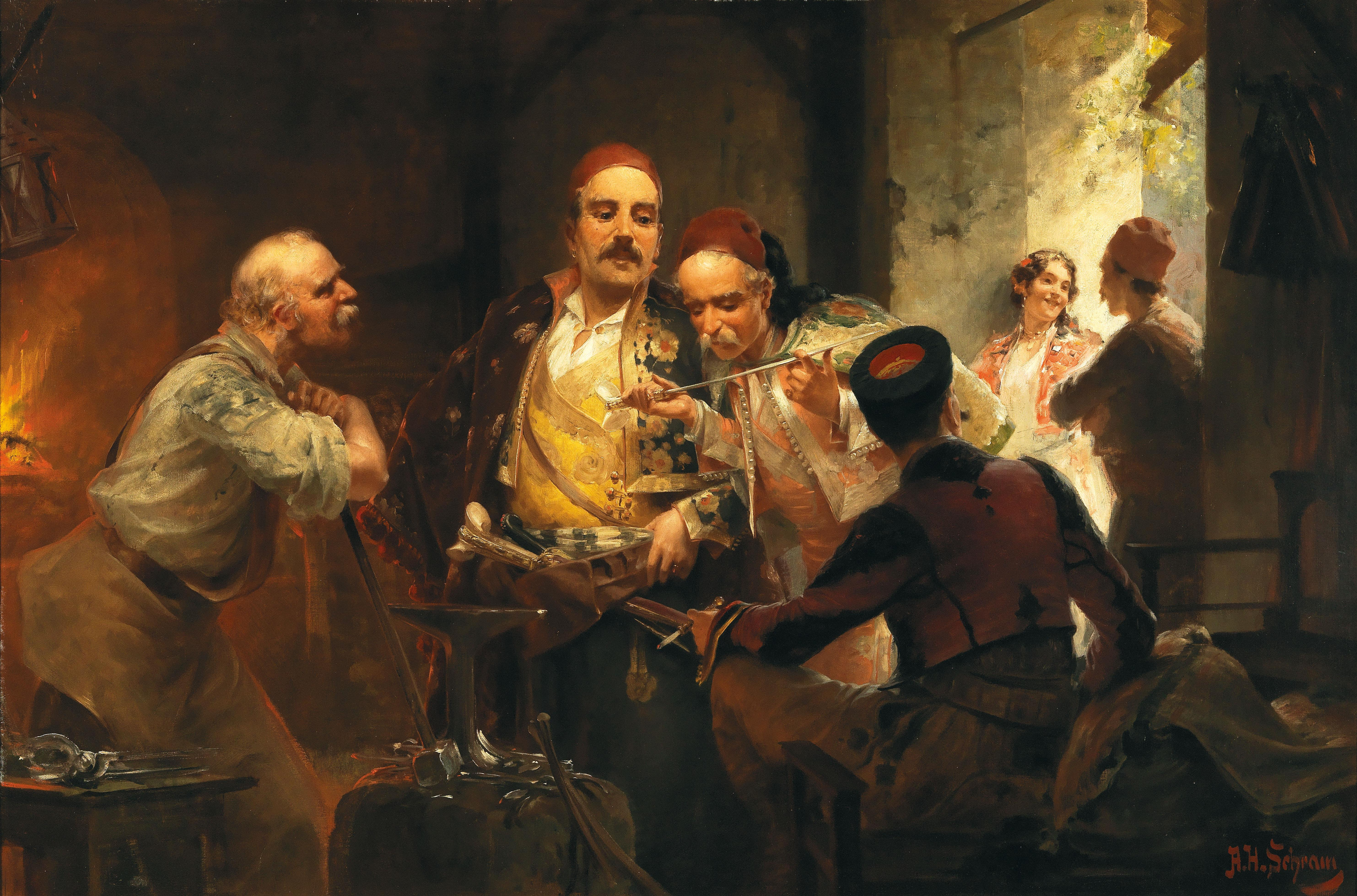
At the Bladesmith's

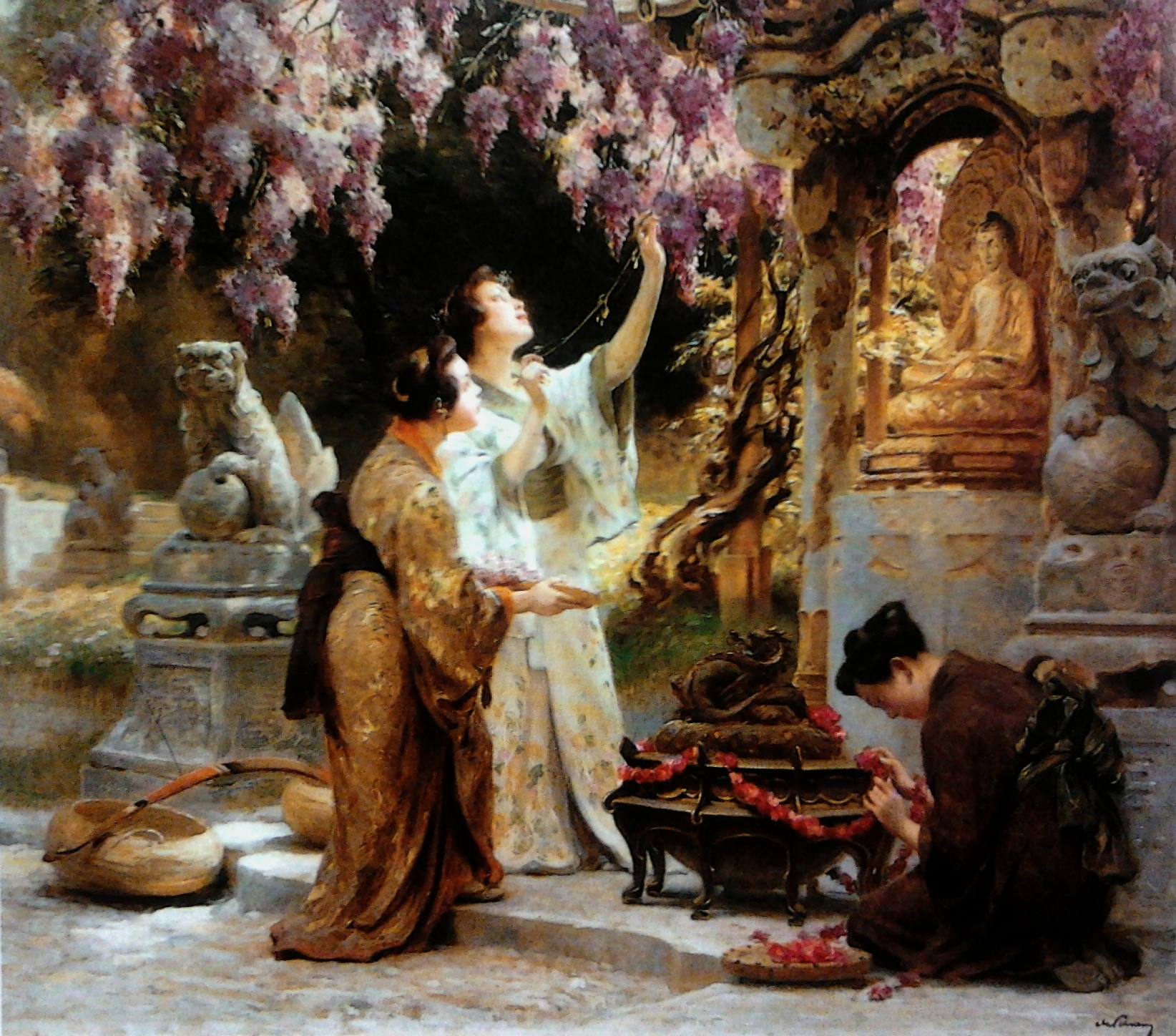
Women decorating the altar

Alois Hans Schram (20 August 1864, Vienna – 8 April 1919, Vienna) was an Austrian portrait, history and decorative painter. Much of his work is in the Art Nouveau style, although many later works may be classified as Neo-Baroque.

== Biography ==
Alois Schram's father was a councilor for the postal service. From 1879 to 1888, he studied at the Academy of Fine Arts, Vienna. His primary instructors there were Carl Wurzinger, Hans Makart and Josef Matyáš Trenkwald.

Schram was awarded the Goldene Füger-Medaille for Composition (1881), and the Spezialschulpreis (1887, for a scene from the life of Bianca Cappello, now at the Denver Art Museum). After graduating, he was granted the Staatspreisstipendium (1890/1891), a scholarship that enabled him to continue his studies in Rome.

When Schram returned, he worked as a portrait and decorative painter in Vienna. During the 1890s, he visited several other European and Middle Eastern countries.

From 1909 to 1911, Schram created allegorical friezes in the Austrian Parliament Building. In 1915, he did a series of ceiling paintings in the ballroom of the Hofburg. Outside of Vienna, he worked at the Palazzo Vivante in Trieste and the judicial building in Salzburg.

For much of his career, Schram was a member of the Gesellschaft bildender Künstler Österreichs (Künstlerhaus). The proceeds from the sale of his estate were given entirely to them, as per his will, to create a fund for the promotion of aspiring artists.

Schram was interred at the Zentralfriedhof.
