= Max Adler (Marxist) =

Austrian jurist, politician and philosopher (1873–1937)

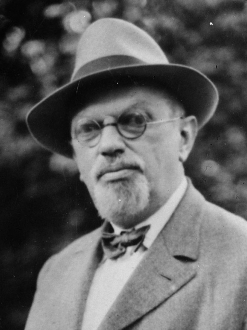
- Adler in 1930
- Born: 15 January 1873; Vienna, Austria-Hungary
- Died: 28 June 1937 (aged 64); Vienna, Federal State of Austria

Education
- Education: University of Vienna (Dr. jur., 1896)

Philosophical work
- Era: 20th-century philosophy
- Region: Western philosophy
- School: Austromarxism
- Institutions: University of Vienna
- Main interests: Social philosophy, educational reform, social democracy

Max Adler (/ˈædlər/; German: [ˈaːdlɐ]; 15 January 1873 – 28 June 1937) was an Austrian jurist, politician and social philosopher; his theories were of central importance to Austromarxism. He was a brother of Oskar Adler.

== Life ==
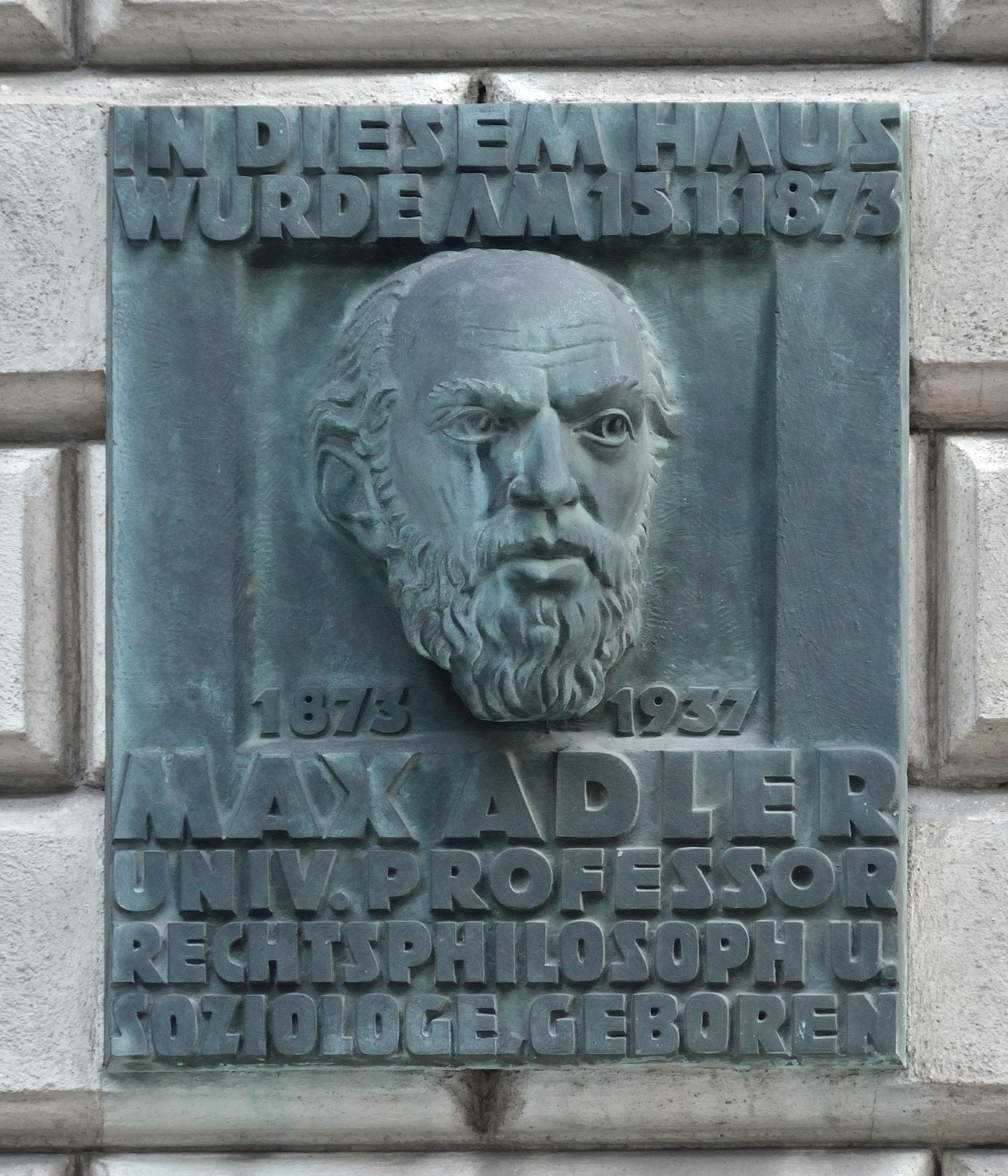
Memorial plaque at his birthplace, Leopoldstadt, Vienna

Max Adler obtained his doctorate in law in 1896, and became a professional lawyer. He began to teach in the “Schönbrunn Circle” in the early summer of 1919. Max Winter, the deputy mayor of Vienna, was able to make rooms available in the main building of Schönbrunn Castle for the Kinderfreunde Österreich (an Austrian association for children and families). In the Schönbrunner Erzieherschule, where young people were trained to be teachers, Max Adler and his colleagues Wilhelm Jerusalem, Alfred Adler, Marianne Pollak, Josef Luitpold Stern and Otto Felix Kanitz were able to realize practical educational reforms. In 1920 he qualified at Vienna University, where he became Extraordinary Professor of Sociology and Social philosophy. From 1919 to 1921 he was a Social-Democratic member of the regional parliament of Niederösterreich. Adler was active in Adult Education, and from 1904 to 1925, with Rudolf Hilferding, editor of "Marx-Studien".

== Works ==
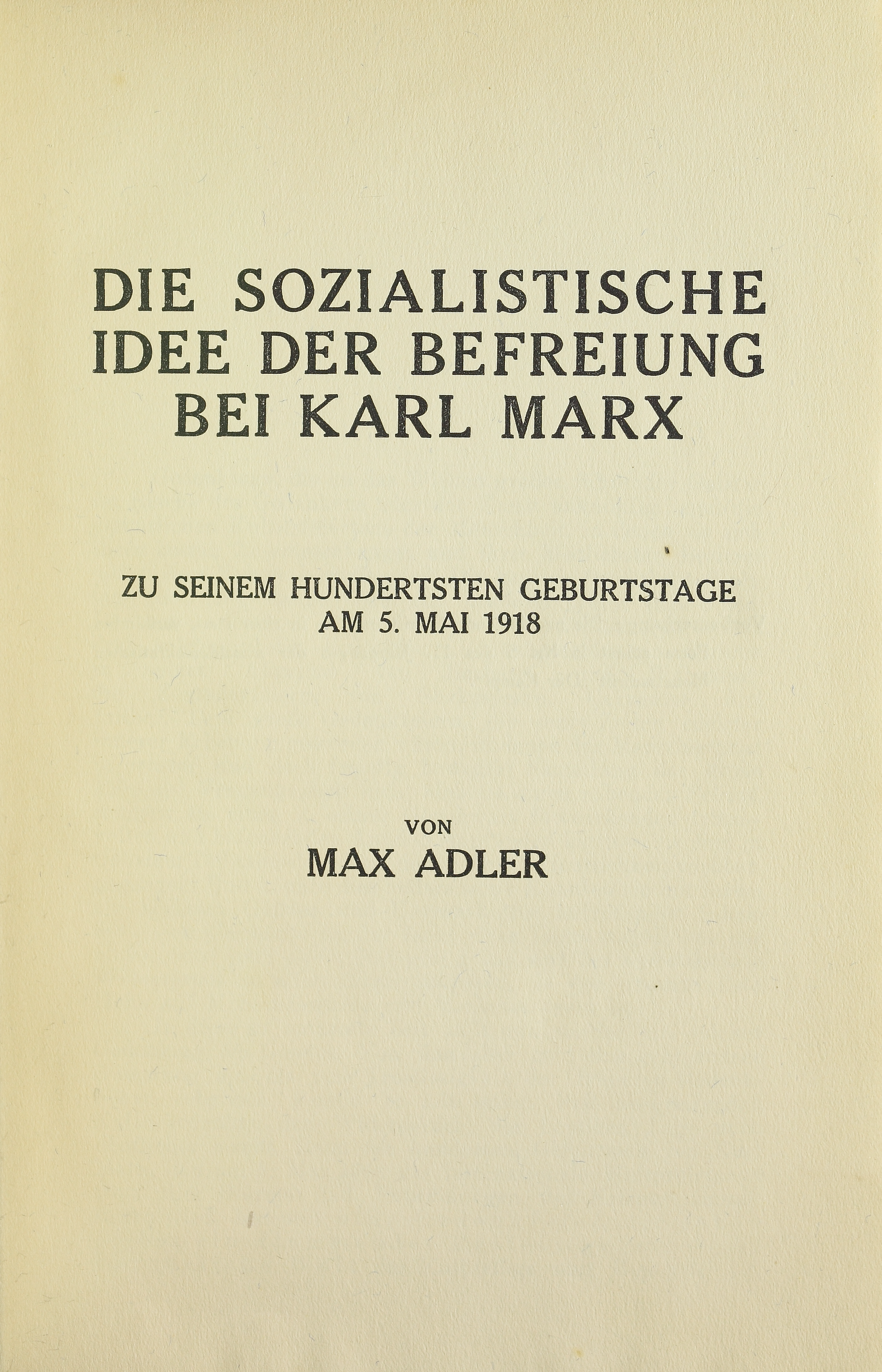
Sozialistische Idee der Befreiung bei Karl Marx, 1918

Max Adler's first theoretical work of note was a study "Max Stirner. Ein Beitrag zur Feststellung des Verhältnisses von Socialismus und Individualismus" (1894). The title sets the agenda for Adler's later theoretical activities. Although this study of Marx's scorned opponent seriously antagonized Marxist Party theorists, and so remained unpublished, Stirner remained an influence on Adler's thinking throughout his life. Adler's biographer Alfred Pfabigan, upon sight of his unpublished papers, was surprised by his "intellectual relationship with Stirner owing to its high degree of continuity".

Because Adler wanted to operate within the framework of the rising Social Democratic movement, he was highly circumspect in his subsequent references to Stirner, and, while continuing to accord him great significance as Marx's "psychological counterpart", initially adopted most aspects of the doctrine of Historical Materialism: the essence of history is class struggle, and its realization entails a union of theory with revolutionary practice. He envisaged "ever greater harmony and perfection" arising from the contradictions inherent in the then state of society, until the proletariat, in the course of its revolution, would finally see "the pursuit of its own class interests" coincide with "the solidarity of society". In a departure from orthodox Marxism, Adler's conception reduces the dialectic to a mere sociological methodology, not expressive of any specific dialectic intrinsic to the historical process. Adler also rejects the association between Scientific Socialism and Materialism: true Marxism was "in reality social idealism". For Adler, Historical Materialism essentially becomes subjective idealism. In all consistency, his particular interest then turned to producing an epistemological critique of Sociology, combining Marxist themes with Kantian transcendentalism. According to Adler, "the individual consciousness is a priori socialized", insofar as every logical judgement already and necessarily includes reference to a multitude of assenting subjects; Adler's 'social a priori' transcendentally implies the possibility of social reality.

Adler's contributions to a Marxist general theory of the state emerged in the course of disputes with Hans Kelsen and Hermann Heller. Criticizing the formal concept of democracy, Adler distinguished between political democracy, as a manifestation of the hegemony of the bourgeoisie, and a social democracy, in which oppression was to be removed along with social differences, the whole to be replaced by "solidarity-based administrative reform" of society. For Adler, the establishment of a socialist society remained linked to the 'dismantling of the machinery of the state' along Marxist lines. Adler the politician permitted no compromises with the so-called "social chauvinism", or majority-Socialist "reformism". Not the least important aspect of the Austromarxism espoused by Adler, Otto Bauer and Rudolf Hilferding was its relevance to the discussions on the left wing of German Social Democracy before 1933.

== Publications ==
- Kausalität und Teleologie im Streite um die Wissenschaft. Vienna 1904
- Marx als Denker. Berlin 1908
- Der Sozialismus und die Intellektuellen. Vienna 1910
- Wegweiser. Studien zur Geistesgeschichte des Sozialismus. Stuttgart: Dietz 1914
- Festschrift für Wilhelm Jerusalem zu seinem 60. Geburtstag. With contributions by Max Adler, Rudolf Eisler, Sigmund Feilbogen, Rudolf Goldscheid, Stefan Hock, Helen Keller, Josef Kraus, Anton Lampa, Ernst Mach, Rosa Mayreder, Julius Ofner, Josef Popper, Otto Simon, Christine Touaillon and Anton Wildgans Vienna/Leipzig: Verlag Wilhelm Braumüller 1915
- Demokratie und Rätesystem. Vienna 1919
- Die Staatsauffassung des Marxismus. Vienna 1922
- Das Soziologische in Kants Erkenntniskritik. Vienna 1924
- Kant und der Marxismus. Berlin 1925
- Politische und soziale Demokratie. Berlin 1926
- Lehrbuch der materialistischen Geschichtsauffassung, 2 vols. Berlin 1930/31
- Das Rätsel der Gesellschaft. Vienna 1936
