= Drenice =

Drenice may refer to:

- Dřenice
- Drenicë
