= Josef Hermann Tautenhayn =

19th-century Austrian medalist and sculptor

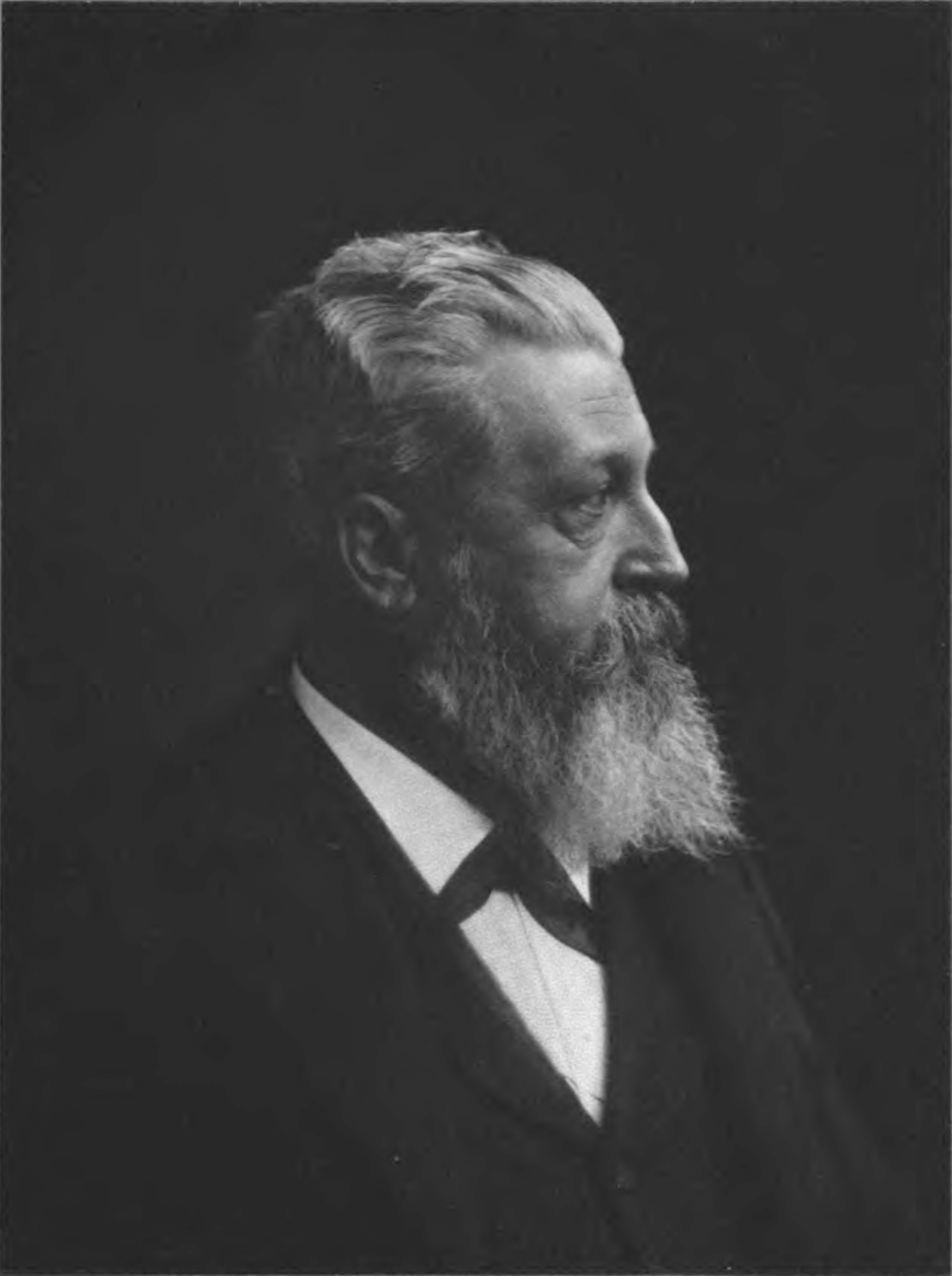
- Undated photo of Tautenhayn by Philipp Wilhelm von Schoeller
- Born: 5 May 1837; Vienna, Austria
- Died: 1 April 1911 (aged 73); Vienna, Austria
- Education: Imperial mint of Austria, Carl Radnitzky, Franz Lukas Bauer
- Known for: Sculpture, Medallic art, Academic art, teaching
- Movement: Academicism

Josef Hermann Tautenhayn (May 5, 1837 - April 1, 1911) was a medalist, sculptor, and professor from Austria-Hungary.

== Biography ==
Tautenhayn was born in Vienna, where he studied at the Academy of Fine Arts Vienna (1854–60) under Carl Radnitzky (1818–1901) and sculpture under Franz Lukas Bauer (1798–1872), then in the engravers' academy of the Imperial mint. After his return from a study trip through Italy, France, and England, undertaken in 1869–72, he was appointed Imperial engraver of coins and medals, and in 1881 professor at the academy.

== Works ==
Among a large number of choice medals those commemorating the coronation of Francis Joseph as king of Hungary (1867), the Imperial Silver Wedding (1879), and the bicentennial of the Relief of Vienna from the Turks (1883), are the most noteworthy. His plastic work on a large scale includes a group of the “Birth of Athens,” and statues for the University of Vienna, also statues for the Art-Historical Museum and the Houses of Parliament.

He was one of the sculptors, namely Carl Kundmann and Hugo Haerdtl, who worked with the erection of The Athena Fountain (Pallas-Athene-Brunnen) in front of the Austrian Parliament.

== See also ==
- Medallic art
