= Anton Wildgans =

Austrian poet and playwright

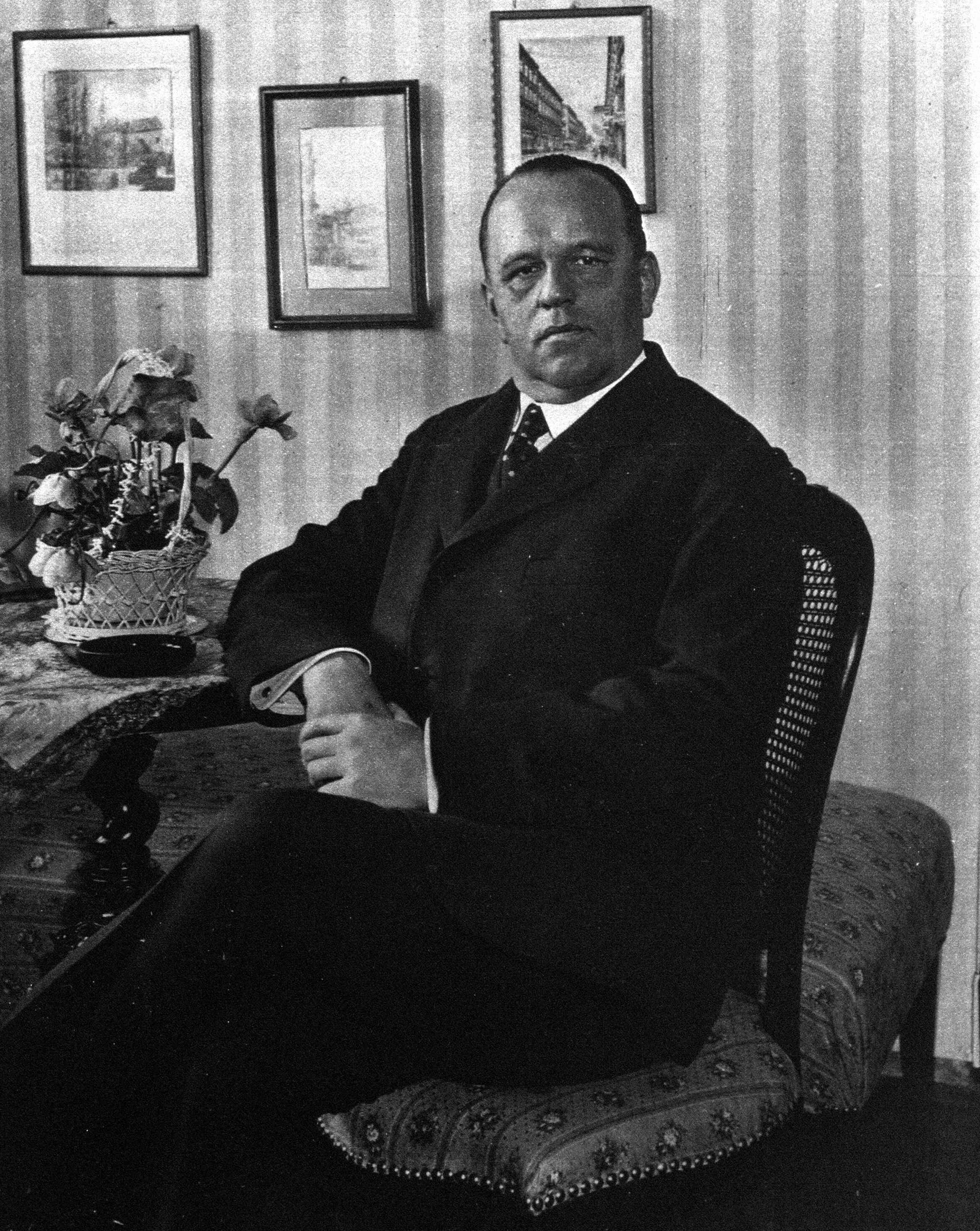
- Born: 17 April 1881; Vienna
- Died: 3 May 1932 (aged 51); Mödling
- Education: University of Vienna
- Writing career
- Genres: drama poetry

Anton Wildgans (17 April 1881 – 3 May 1932) was an Austrian poet and playwright. He was nominated for the Nobel Prize in Literature four times.

== Life ==
Born in Vienna, Wildgans studied law at the University of Vienna, from 1900 to 1909, and then practiced as an examining magistrate (Untersuchungsrichter) from 1909 to 1911, before devoting himself to writing full-time.

His works, in which realism, neo-romanticism and expressionism mingle, focus on the drama of daily life.

He twice served as director of Vienna's Burgtheater, in 1921–1922 and 1930–1931.

One of his teachers was the Austrian Jewish philosopher Wilhelm Jerusalem. Wildgans was the mentor of writer Albert Drach.

Wildgans died in Mödling. The Wildganshof, a residential development in the 3rd District of Vienna, is named after him.

== Selected works ==
- Armut ("Poverty"), drama, 1914
- Liebe ("Love"), drama, 1916
- Dies Irae, drama, 1918
- Sämtliche Werke ("Complete Works"), 1948. Historical-critical edition in 8 volumes edited by Lilly Wildgans with the collaboration of Otto Rommel. Vienna/Salzburg: Gemeinschaftsverlag Bellaria/Pustet, 1948
