= Wilhelm Jerusalem =

Austrian-Jewish philosopher (1854–1923)

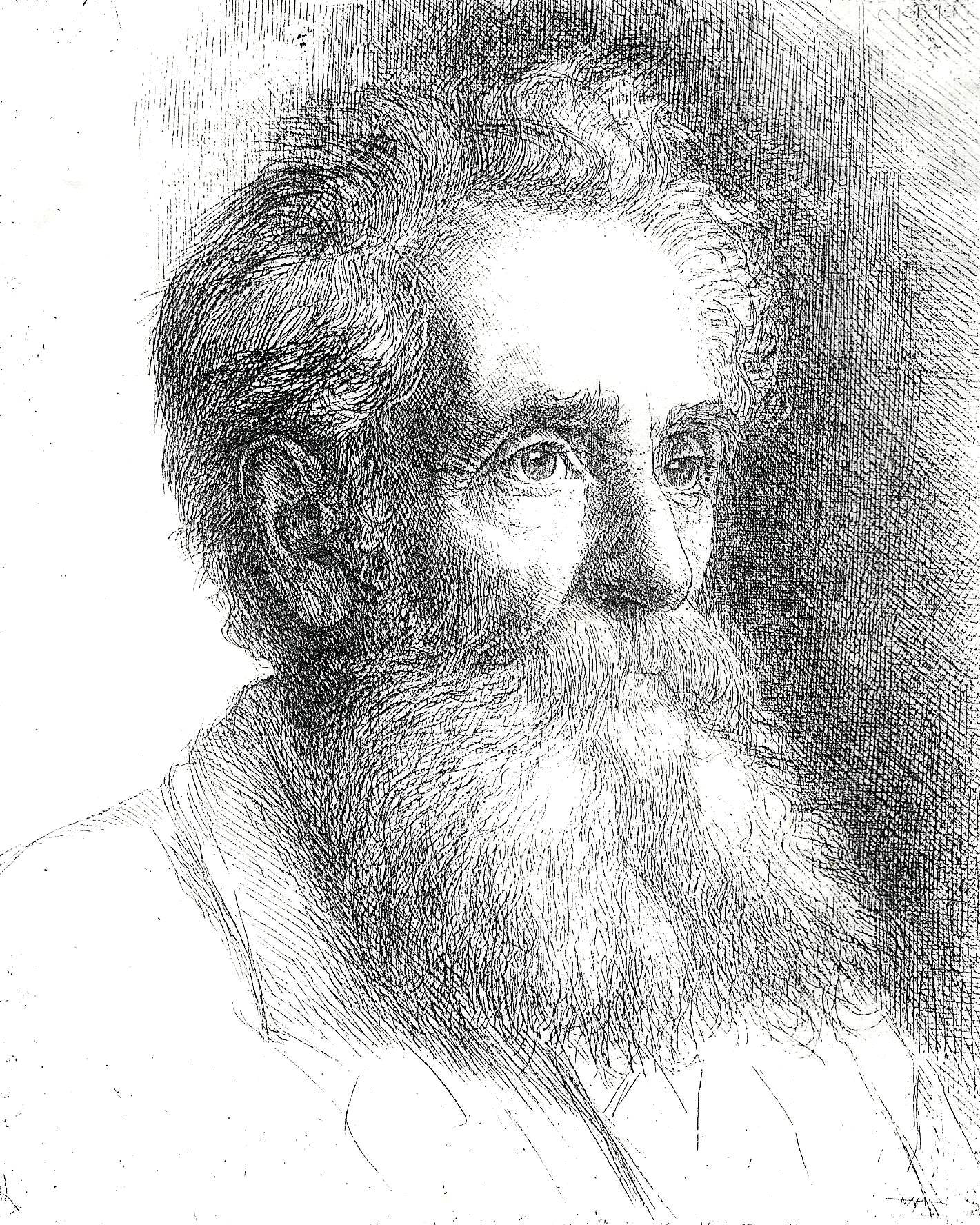
Wilhelm Jerusalem

Wilhelm Jerusalem (Austrian German: [jeˈruːzalɛm]; 11 October 1854, Dřenice – 15 July 1923, Vienna) was an Austrian Jewish philosopher and pedagogue.

== Biography ==
Jerusalem studied classical philosophy at the University of Prague and prepared a doctorate entitled "The Inscription of Sestos and Polybios". Until 1887 he was a teacher at grammar schools in Prague and Nikolsburg. In 1888, he became a member of the staff of teachers at the "k.k. Staatsgymnasium im VIII. Bezirk Wiens" (Bundesgymnasium Wien 8, founded in 1701) in Vienna. In 1891 he was an outside lecturer at the University of Vienna. One of his interests was education, and he demanded changes in the educational system of the Austro-Hungarian monarchy.

Another of his fields of interest was the education of minorities. In 1890 he published a psychological study about the education of deafblind Laura Bridgman. Jerusalem is regarded as the discoverer of the literary talent of the deaf-blind writer Helen Keller who he corresponded with, although they never met personally. From scientific work about the deafblind he developed the Austrian direction of the philosophical method of Pragmatism. In 1907 he translated William James's "Pragmatism" into German.

After World War I he became an associate professor of philosophy and educational theory at the University of Vienna, and in 1919 became one of the teachers of the "Schönbrunner Schule" (Schönbrunn School), which came about after the Vice Mayor of Vienna Max Winter had obtained a considerable part of the Viennese Schönbrunn Palace to be used for the advancement of the education of young women, and a small number of men, to become educators and teachers.

In 1923, Jerusalem became a full Professor at the University of Vienna. He died of a heart attack on 15 July 1923, in Vienna.

Among his students were the writer Stephan Hock, the politician Karl Renner, the composer Viktor Ullmann, the poet Anton Wildgans, the philosopher Vladimir Dvorniković and Otto Felix Kanitz.

== Works ==
- Laura Bridgman, Erziehung einer Taubblinden, Vienna 1890
- Die Urtheilsfunction, Vienna-Leipzig 1895
- Kants Bedeutung für die Gegenwart, Vienna-Leipzig 1904
- Wege und Ziele der Ästhetik, Vienna 1906
- Der Pragmatismus, Vorwort zur Übersetzung des Werkes von William James, Leipzig 1907
- Die Aufgaben des Lehrers an Höheren Schulen, Vienna-Leipzig 1912
- Der Krieg im Lichte der Gesellschaftslehre, Stuttgart 1915
- "Zu dem Menschen redet eben die Geschichte", in Friedenspflichten des Einzelnen, Gotha 1917
- "Moralische Richtlinien nach dem Kriege. Ein Beitrag zur soziologischen Ethik, Vienna 1918
- Einleitung in die Philosophie, siebte bis zehnte Auflage, Vienna 1919-1923
- "Meine Wege und Ziele", in: Die Philosophie der Gegenwart in Selbstdarstellungen, vol. III, ed. Raymond Schmidt, Leipzig 1992
- Einführung in die Soziologie, Vienna-Leipzig 1926
