= Die Unzufriedene =

Feminist magazine in Austria (1923–1944)

- Categories: Feminist magazine
- Frequency: Weekly
- Publisher: Social Democratic Party
- Founder: Max Winter; Paula Hons
- Founded: 1923
- First issue: 22 September 1923
- Final issue: 1944
- Country: Austria
- Based in: Vienna
- Language: German

Die Unzufriedene (German: The Discontented) was a weekly political magazine with a special reference to women. Its subtitle was unabhängige Wochenschrift für alle Frauen (German: independent weekly for all women) and its motto was "Human progress lies in discontent!". The magazine was in circulation between 1923 and 1944 in Vienna, Austria.

== History and profile ==
Die Unzufriedene was founded by Max Winter and Paula Hons, and its first issue appeared on 22 September 1923. The Social Democratic Party was its publisher. Winter also edited the magazine until 1931 when Hons replaced him in the post. The magazine came out weekly and attempted to balance between political enlightenment of women and reporting news about fashion and entertainment. It adopted a social democratic political stance and was a supporter of feminism. The magazine asked children to report the abuse by their parents if they experience it. It sold over 150,000 in the early 1930s. In a study carried out in the same period it was found that 21,4% of 1,320 Viennese female factory workers read Die Unzufriedene.

In February 1934 Die Unzufriedene had to temporarily cease publication. On 1 July 1934 it resumed publication, but its editorial line changed radically. In addition, its title was changed to Das kleine Frauenblatt with the original subtitle, unabhängige Wochenschrift für alle Frauen. The magazine appeared with this title until 1944.
