= Carl Wurzinger =

Austrian painter (1817–1883)

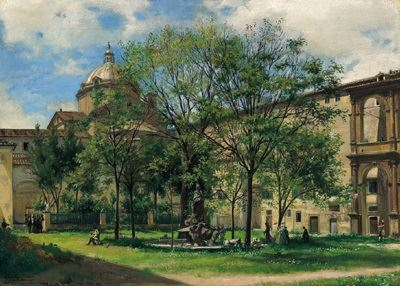
Roman Motif

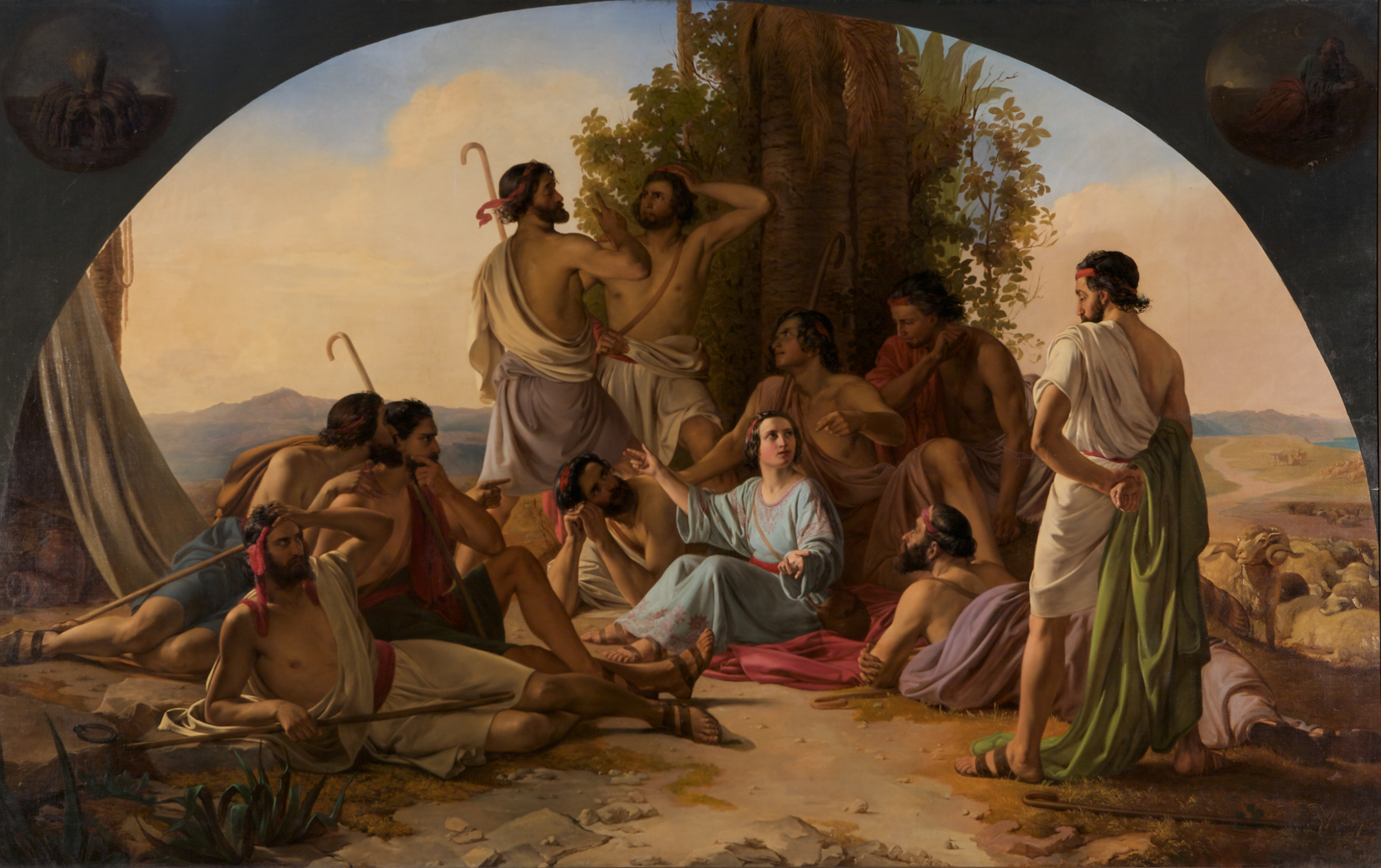
Joseph Recounts his Dreams

Carl Wurzinger (1 June 1817, Vienna - 16 March 1883, Vienna) was an Austrian history painter and a professor at the Academy of Fine Arts, Vienna.

== Life and work ==
His father was the caretaker for an estate. In 1832, at the age of fourteen, he became a student at the Academy of Fine Arts. He exhibited his first works in 1844. Three years later, he left Vienna to continue his education in Italy. He remained there for nine years.

Upon his return home in 1856, he became a professor at the Academy; specializing in history painting. After that point, he concentrated almost exclusively on his teaching, rather than painting. His few works were meticulously done and historically accurate, but received very little critical attention. He was eventually appointed a Senior Professor.

He was named a Knight in the Austrian Order of Franz Joseph and the Bavarian Order of Saint Michael. He was also presented with the Order of St. Gregory the Great.

In 1910, a street in the Währing district of Vienna was named after him.
