= Austrian Parliament Building =

Coordinates: 48°12′29″N 16°21′29″E

- Parlamentsgebäude (German)
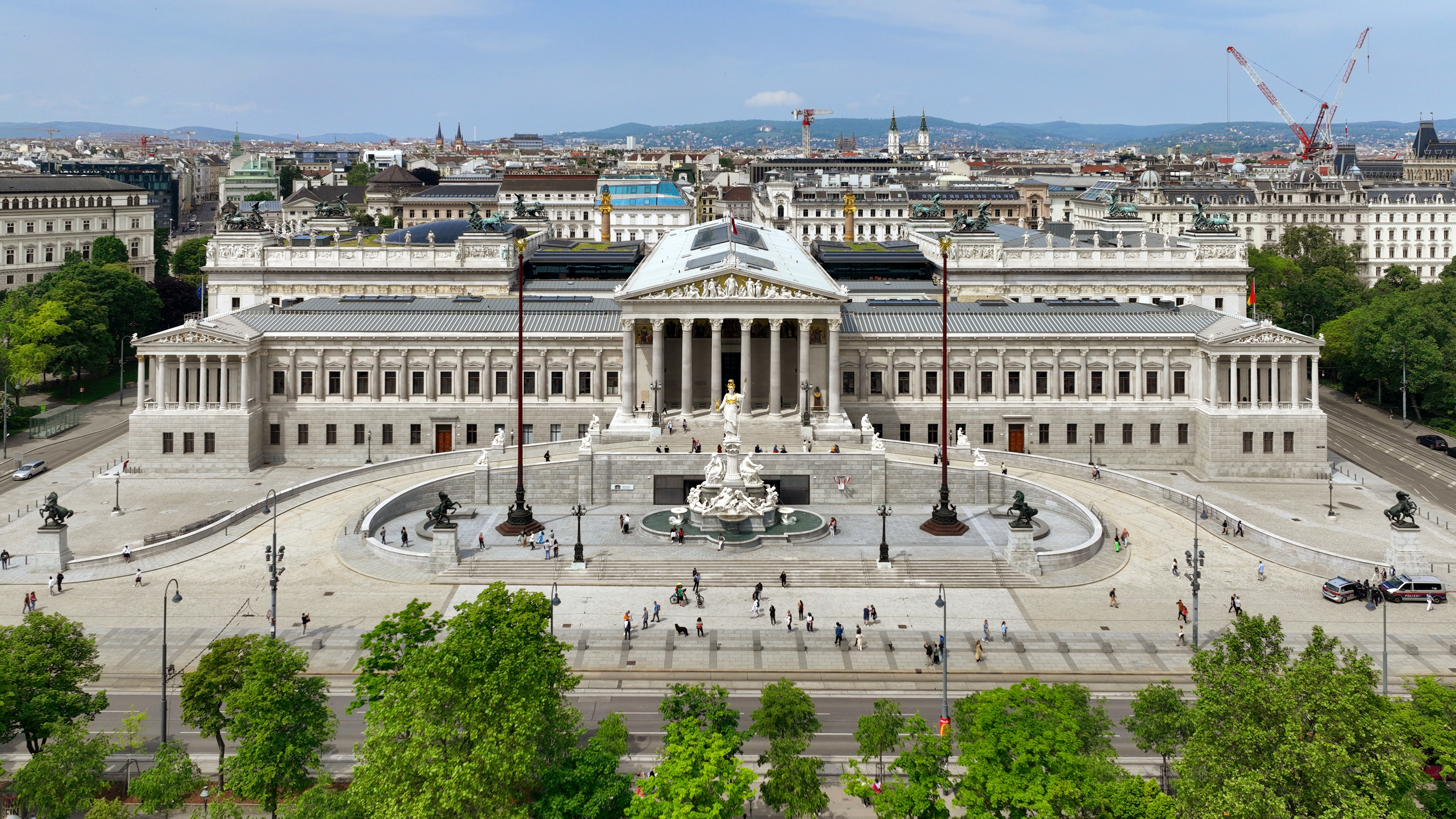
- Interactive map of the Austrian Parliament Building area
- Former names: Reichsrat

General information
- Status: Legislative Building
- Type: Parliament
- Architectural style: Neoclassical architecture
- Location: Vienna, Austria
- Construction started: 1874
- Opened: 1883; 143 years ago

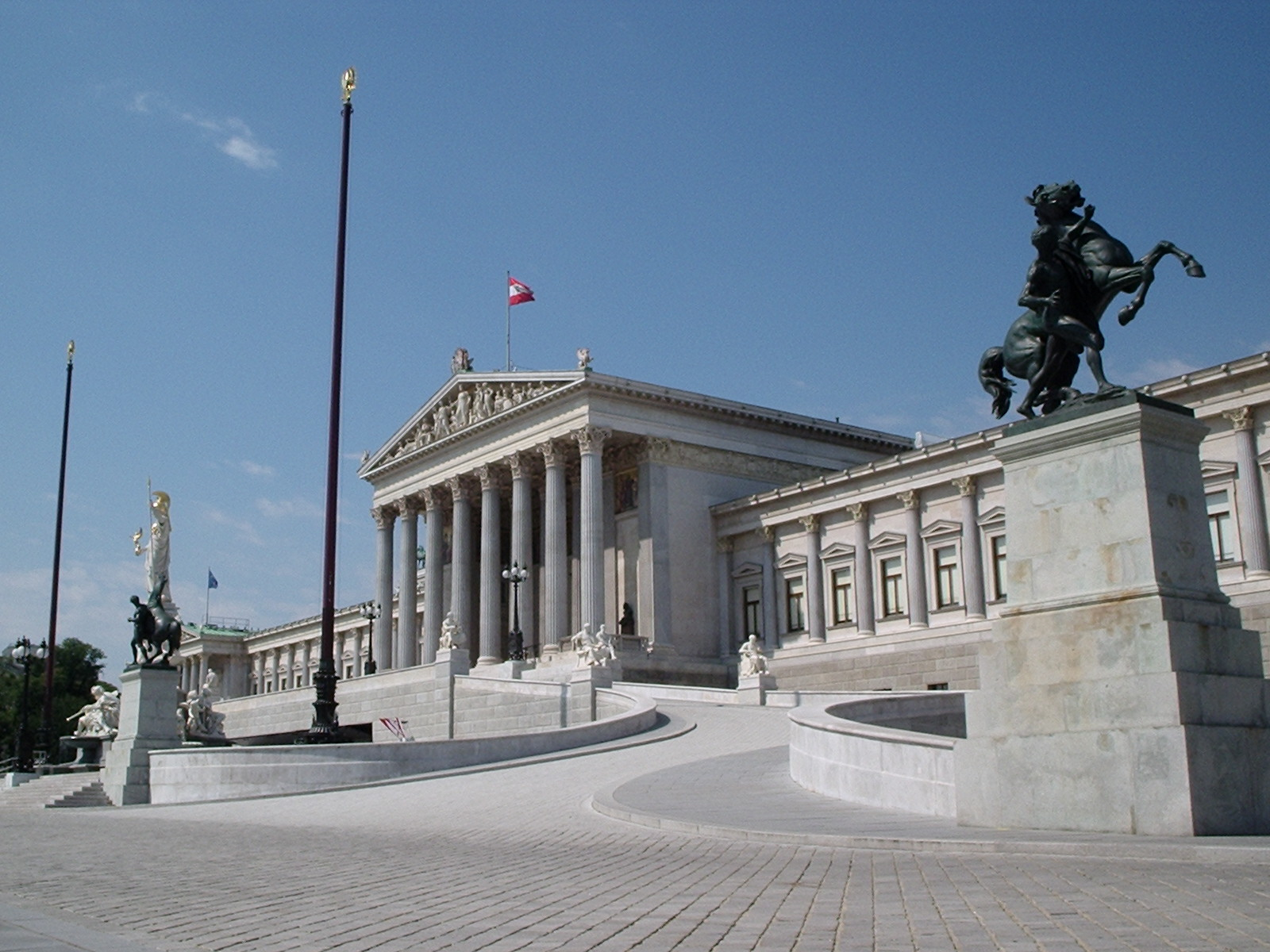
Parliament Building on the Ringstraße, Innere Stadt

The Austrian Parliament Building (German: Parlamentsgebäude, pronounced [paʁlaˈmɛnt͡sɡəˌbɔɪ̯də] colloquially das Parlament) in Vienna is the meeting place of the two houses of the Austrian Parliament. The building is located on the Ringstraße in the first district, Innere Stadt, near Hofburg Palace and the Palace of Justice. It was built to house the two chambers of the Imperial Council (Reichsrat), the bicameral legislature of the Cisleithanian (Austrian) part of the Austro-Hungarian Empire. Since its construction, the Parliament Building has been the seat of these two houses, and their successors—the National Council (Nationalrat) and the Federal Council (Bundesrat)—of the Austrian legislature.

The foundation stone was laid in 1874; the building was completed in 1883. The architect responsible for its Greek Revival style was Theophil Hansen. He designed the building holistically, aiming to have each element harmonize with all the others, and was also responsible for the interior decoration, such as statues, paintings, furniture, chandeliers, and numerous other elements. Hansen was honored by Emperor Franz Joseph with the title of Freiherr (Baron) after its completion. Following heavy damage and destruction in World War II, most of the interior has been restored to its original splendor.

The parliament building covers over 13,500 square meters (145,300 sq ft), making it one of the largest structures on the Ringstraße. It contains over one hundred rooms, the most prominent of which are the Chambers of the National Council, the Federal Council, and the former House of Deputies (Abgeordnetenhaus). The building also includes committee rooms, libraries, lobbies, dining rooms, bars and gymnasiums. One of the building's most famous features is the Pallas Athena fountain in front of the main entrance, built by Carl Kundmann after plans from Hansen from 1898 to 1902; it is one of the city's most notable tourist attractions.

The Parliament Building is the site of important state ceremonies, most notably the swearing-in ceremony of the president of Austria. The building is closely associated with the two parliamentary bodies, as is shown by the use of the term Hohes Haus as a metonym for "Parliament". Parliamentary offices spill over into nearby buildings, such as the Palais Epstein.

After five years of renovations, the building reopened in 2023.

== History ==
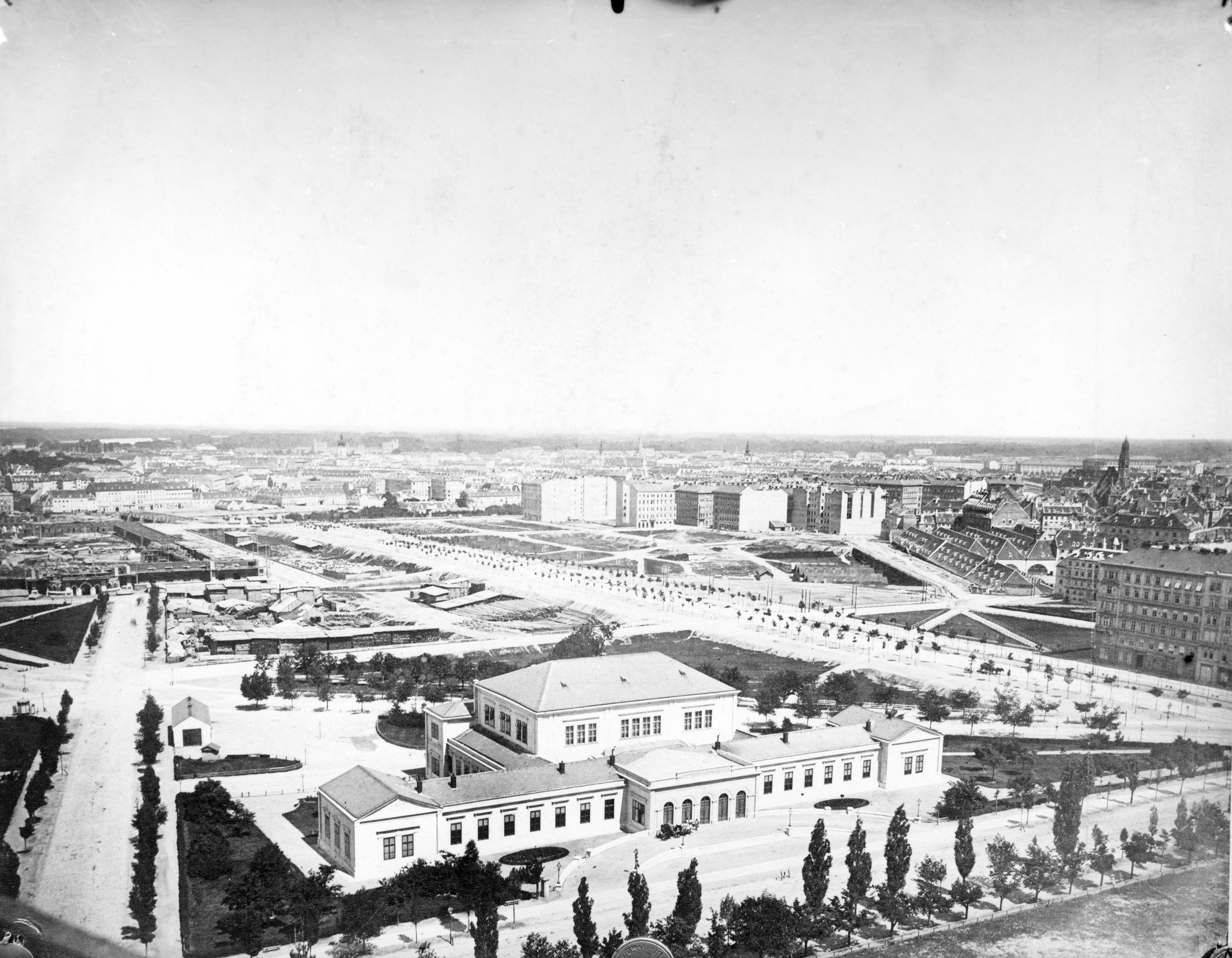
Provisional House of Deputies building, view from Votive Church, 1860s

The constitution known as the February Patent, promulgated in 1861, created an Imperial Council as an Austrian legislature, and a new building had to be constructed to house this constitutional organ. The original plan was to construct two separate buildings, one for the House of Lords (Herrenhaus) and one for the House of Deputies (Abgeordnetenhaus). However, after the Austro-Hungarian Compromise (Ausgleich) which effectively created the Dual Monarchy in 1867, the Kingdom of Hungary received its own separate legislative body, the re-established Diet, and the original plan for two buildings was dropped.

The precursor to the present building was the temporary House of Representatives, located on Währinger Straße, off the newly laid-out Ringstraße boulevard. It was erected within six weeks in March and April 1861 according to plans designed by Ferdinand Fellner, a famous Austrian theatre architect. In its layout with a ramp and a lobby area, the Abgeordnetenhaus was a model for the later Parliament Building. Completed on 25 April 1861 this temporary structure was opened by Emperor Franz Joseph I of Austria, and soon afterwards mocked Schmerlingtheater, after Minister Anton von Schmerling. It was used by the deputies of Cisleithania until the completion of the present-day parliament building in 1883, while the House of Lords met at the Estates House of Lower Austria, then the seat of the Lower Austrian Landtag.

=== Construction ===
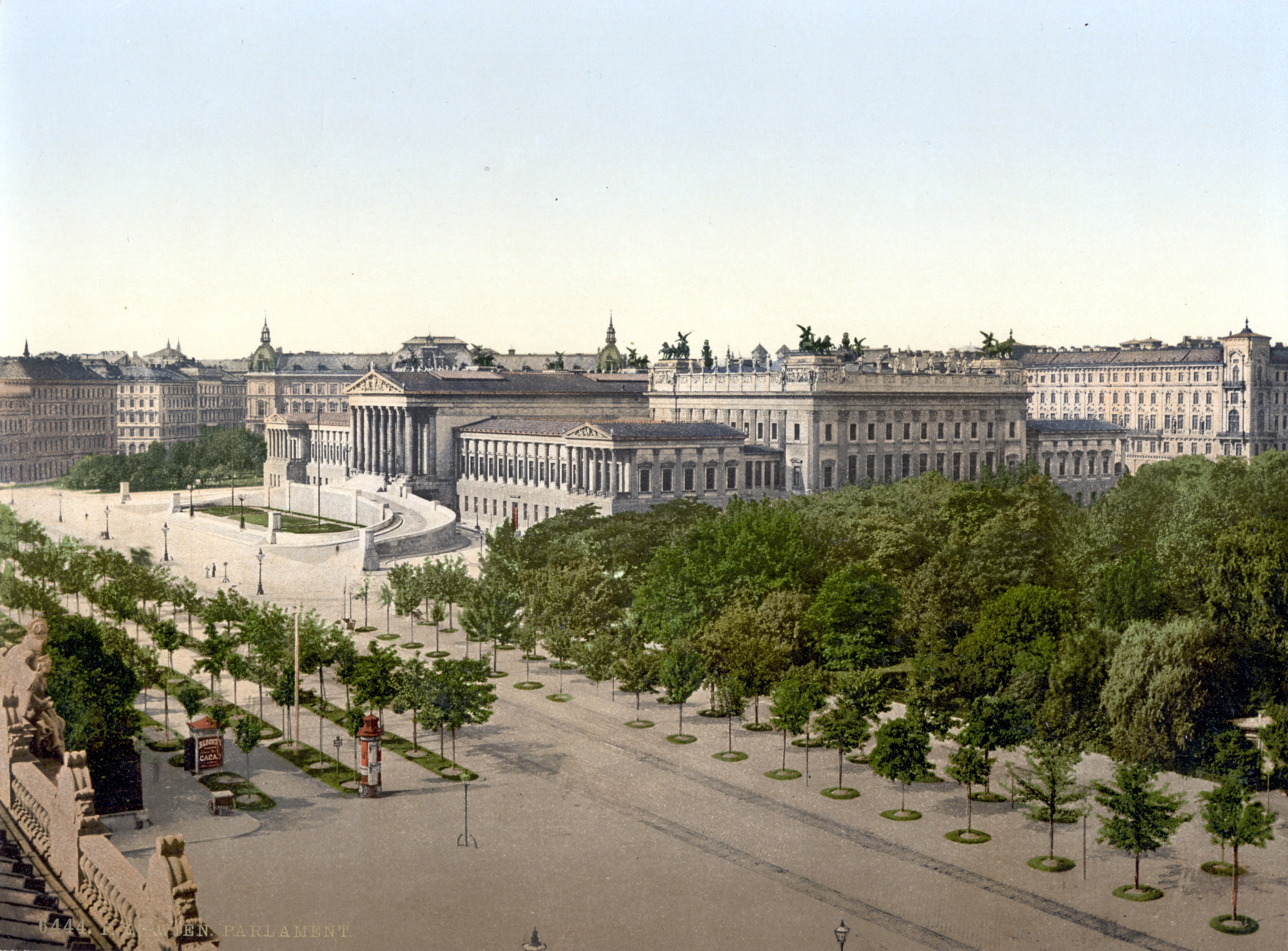
Ringstraße and Parliament Building around 1900

The site for the new building was on the city's ancient fortifications and walls. In his famous decree Es ist Mein Wille of 1857, Emperor Franz Joseph I had laid down plans for the Ringstraße to replace the old city walls. The parliament building was supposed to feature prominently on the boulevard, in close proximity to Hofburg Palace and the Vienna City Hall.

An Imperial Commission was appointed to consider a design for a Parliament building. Influenced by the industrialist and politician Nikolaus Dumba, the Commission decided that its style should be classical, the argument being that classical Greek architecture was appropriate for a Parliament because of the connection to the Ancient Greeks and the ideal of democracy. After studying rival proposals, the Imperial Commission chose the plan by Theophil Hansen, who could rely on his drafts for Zappeion Hall in Athens. In 1869 the k.k. Ministry of the Interior gave von Hansen the order to design the new Austrian parliament building.

Ground was broken in June 1874; on the cornerstone is inscribed the date "2 September 1874". At the same time, work also commenced on the nearby Kunsthistorisches Museum and Naturhistorisches Museum on Maria-Theresien-Platz, the City Hall, and the University. In November 1883 the offices of the House of Representatives were completed and put to use. On 4 December 1883, the House of Representatives held its first session under its president, Franz Smolka. On 16 December 1884 the House of Lords under its president, Count Trauttmansdorff, held its first session. Both chambers would continue to meet in the building until the end of the Austro-Hungarian Empire in 1918.

The official name of the building was Reichsratsgebäude (Imperial Council Building), and the street behind the building, the Reichsratsstraße, still recalls this former name. The word "Parlament", however, has been in colloquial use since its construction.

=== Building history ===
The building saw tumultuous years during the late years of the declining multi-ethnic Austrian monarchy stretching from Dalmatia to Bukovina, as the House of Representatives was extremely fractious with tensions among liberals and conservatives, German nationalists and Young Czech deputies, as well as between the government and parliament. It became notorious for filibusters, parliamentary brawls, and undisciplined deputies throwing inkwells at each other as a common feature. The joke on the Viennese streets was that Athena was so disgusted by the political infighting that she deliberately turned her back to the building. Nevertheless, the building housed the first form of a parliamentary system for many of the people of Central Europe. Some of the former deputies continued their political careers after the dissolution of the Empire and became important politicians in their home countries.

The Reichsratsgebäude continued to function until 1918, when the building was occupied by demonstrators during the disintegration of the Austro-Hungarian Empire. From 21 October 1918, the remaining German-speaking deputies convened in a "Provisional National Assembly", initially at the Palais Niederösterreich, from 12 November onwards in the Parliament Building. On that day, the presidents of the assembly officially proclaimed the Republic of German-Austria from the ramp in front of the building. Upon the Austrian Constitutional Assembly election in 1919 and the establishment of the First Austrian Republic, the building itself was renamed the Parlament, with the new republican National Council (Nationalrat) and Federal Council (Bundesrat) replacing the old Imperial House of Deputies (Abgeordnetenhaus) and the House of Lords (Herrenhaus).

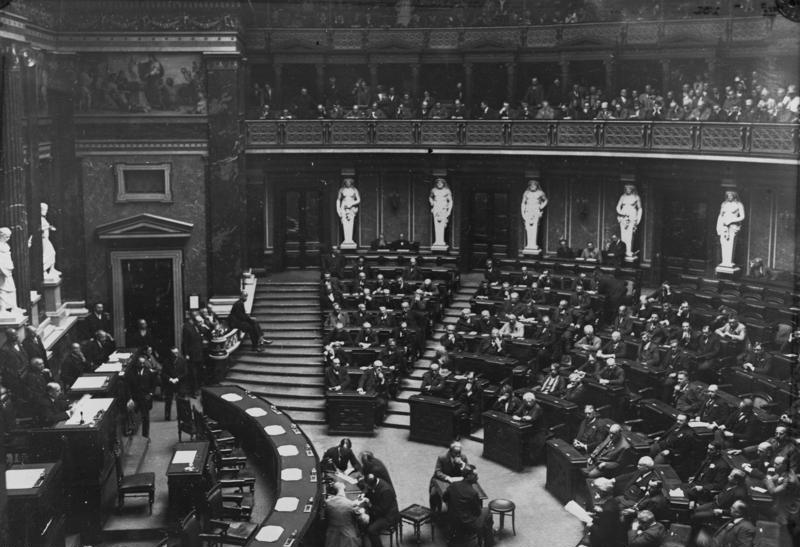
The parliament in session in 1930

The parliament was incapacitated, when on 4 March 1933 Chancellor Engelbert Dollfuß took the occasion of a parliamentary law quarrel to cease its function, the first step to the introduction of his Austrofascist dictatorship. By the imposed "May Constitution" of 1934, the Parliament Building became the seat of the Bundestag, the formal legislature of the Federal State of Austria. It finally lost its function with the Austrian Anschluss to Nazi Germany in 1938. The Nazis used it as an administrative seat of the Vienna Reichsgau. During the Second World War, half of the building suffered heavy damage by Allied bombing and the Vienna Offensive. Parts of the interior, such as the former House of Lords Chamber and the Hall of Columns, were completely destroyed.

It was in the old Abgeordnetenhaus Chamber that the new Chancellor Karl Renner on 27 April 1945 declared the rebirth of an independent Austria, backed by Soviet troops. Max Fellerer and Eugen Wörle were commissioned as architects; they chose to redesign and adapt the former Lords Chamber into the National Council, and in the process, the meeting room of the National Council was rebuilt in a Modern and functional style. Work on the National Council Chamber was completed in 1956. The original appearance of the other publicly accessible premises, such as the Hall of Columns, and the building's external appearance were largely restored to von Hansen's design.

== Exterior ==
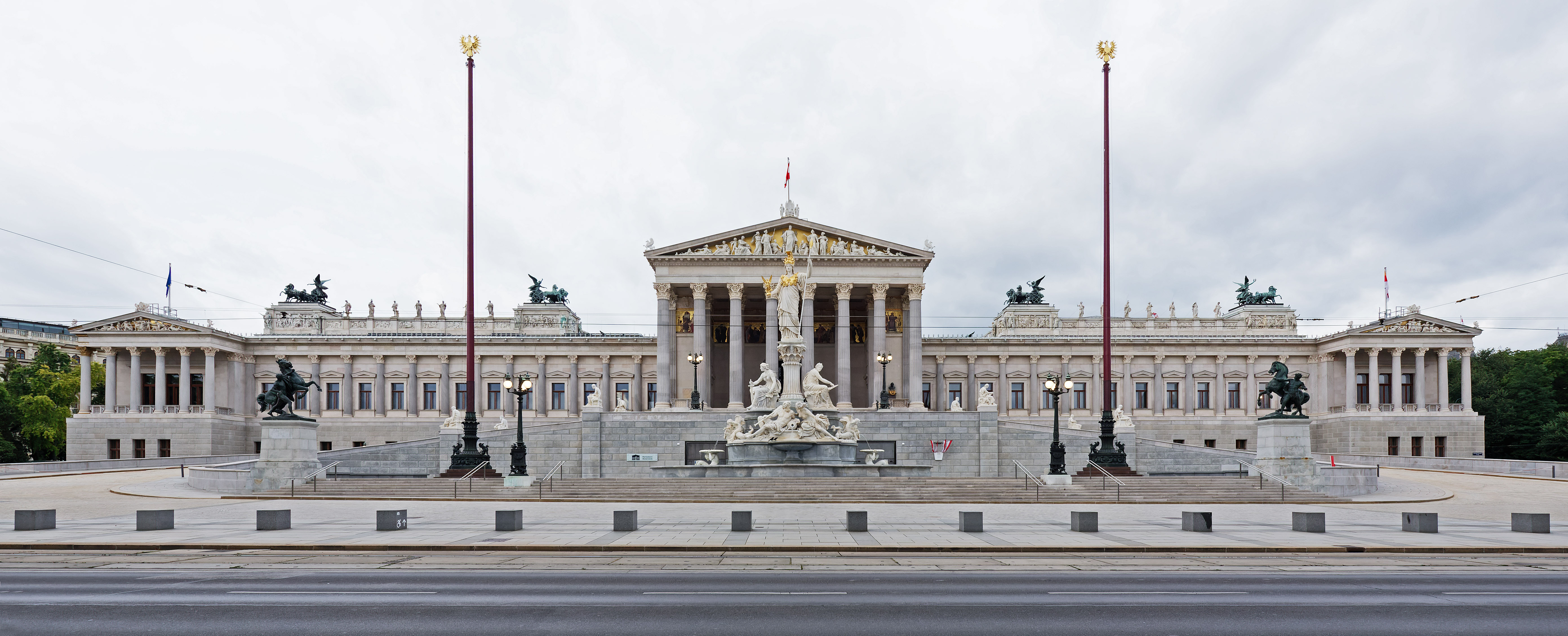
Front view of the Parliament Building

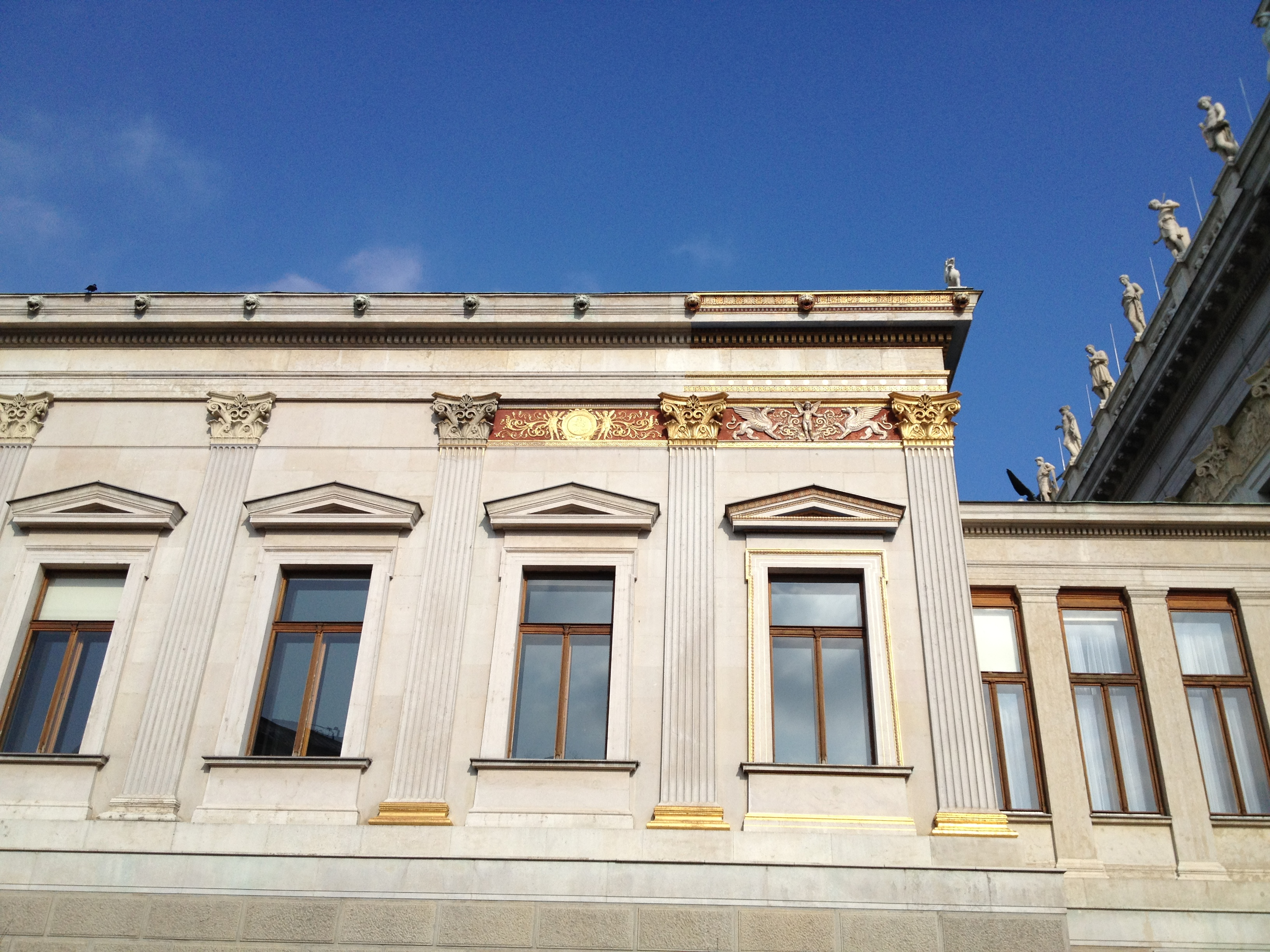
Coloured sections of the facade. The architect Baron von Hansen's original intent was to have the whole exterior polychrome, like in ancient Greece.

Baron von Hansen's design for the Reichsratsgebäude uses the neo-Greek style, which was popular during the 19th century Classic revival. Hansen worked at that time in Athens and was recruited by the Greek-Austrian magnate Nikolaus Dumba, who was on the committee for constructing a new parliament building.

Hansen was inspired by the design of the Zappeion hall in Athens. The original plans saw separate buildings for the House of Representatives and the House of Lords, but for practical and financial reasons it was later decided to house both chambers in one building. Von Hansen's concept of the layout reflected the structure of the Imperial Council (Reichsrat), as was stipulated by the so-called February Patent of 1861, which laid down the constitutional structure for the empire. The two chambers were connected by the great hypostyle hall, which was the central structure. The hall was supposed to be the meeting point between the commoners and the lords, reflecting the structure of society at the time.

The gable has not changed since the monarchy and is decorated with symbols and allegories of the 17 provinces (Kronländer) of the then Austro-Hungarian Empire. The ramp is about four meters high. The pillars are in the Corinthian style. On both ends of the roof are quadrigas. The building used to be surrounded by small patches of lawns, which have since been transformed into parking spaces. The building is up to four stories high.

The architect's original plan was to have the entire exterior in polychrome, like in ancient Greece. For this purpose, he created a showpiece on the southern side of the building, with gilded capitals and red and gilded friezes. However, the plan was not implemented due to budgetary constraints.

=== Roof ===
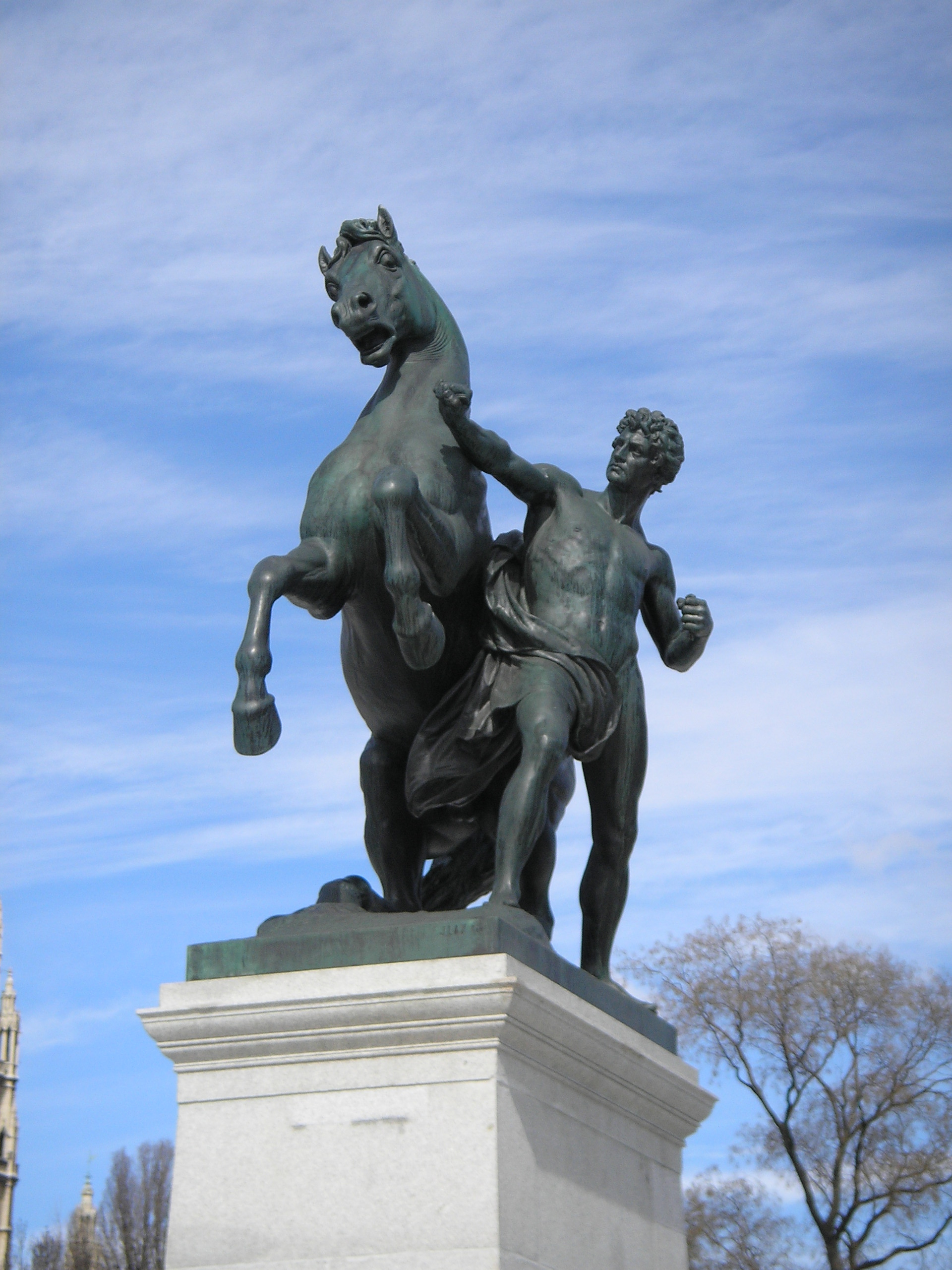
Bronze horse tamer (Rossbändiger)

Corresponding to the horse tamers at the Ringstraße ramp, eight quadrigas made of bronze decorate both ends of the roof. The quadriga is a symbol of victory, driven by the goddess of victory, Nike. The attic design of both chambers is rich in symbolism, with 76 marble statues and 66 reliefs forming a decorative ensemble. There are 44 allegorical statues that represent human qualities and branches of human activity, while 32 statues represent famous personalities from Classical Antiquity. The reliefs are allegorical as well and correspond to the areas of public life on which the famous personalities impacted. The crown lands, important cities, and rivers of the empire are portrayed in 50 smaller reliefs. The roof is for the most part kept in the ancient Greek form, decorated with ancient Greek-style caps and palmettes made of copper sheet metal.

=== Material ===
It was the emperor's personal wish to use Austrian marble for the construction of the buildings on the Ringstraße. For that purpose, marble from the village of Laas in the county of Tyrol was brought in and used generously on the Hofburg Palace and Reichsratsgebäude. The white, sturdy stone was perfect for von Hansen's aims, since the building blocks for the façade and statues could be made to look like those used in ancient Greece. Over the decades, with increased air pollution, the marble has proved remarkably resilient, stronger than its famous counterpart from Carrara.

=== Bronzework ===
Four bronze statues of horse tamers are located at the two lower ends of the ramp (Auffahrtsrampe). They are a powerful symbol of the suppression of passion, an important precondition for successful parliamentary cooperation. They were designed and executed by J. Lax in the Kaiserlich Königliche Kunst-Erzgießerei in 1897 and 1900. Further bronzeworks include the two quadrigas on top of the roof, each chariot pulled by four horses and steered by the goddess Nike. The bronze works had to undergo extensive conservation and restoration work in the 1990s to combat damage from acid rain and air pollution. Further oxidation corroded the bronze over the decades and ate holes into the sculptures. For that purpose, each sculpture was completely encased in a separate structure to protect them from the elements while they underwent restoration.

=== Pallas Athene Fountain ===
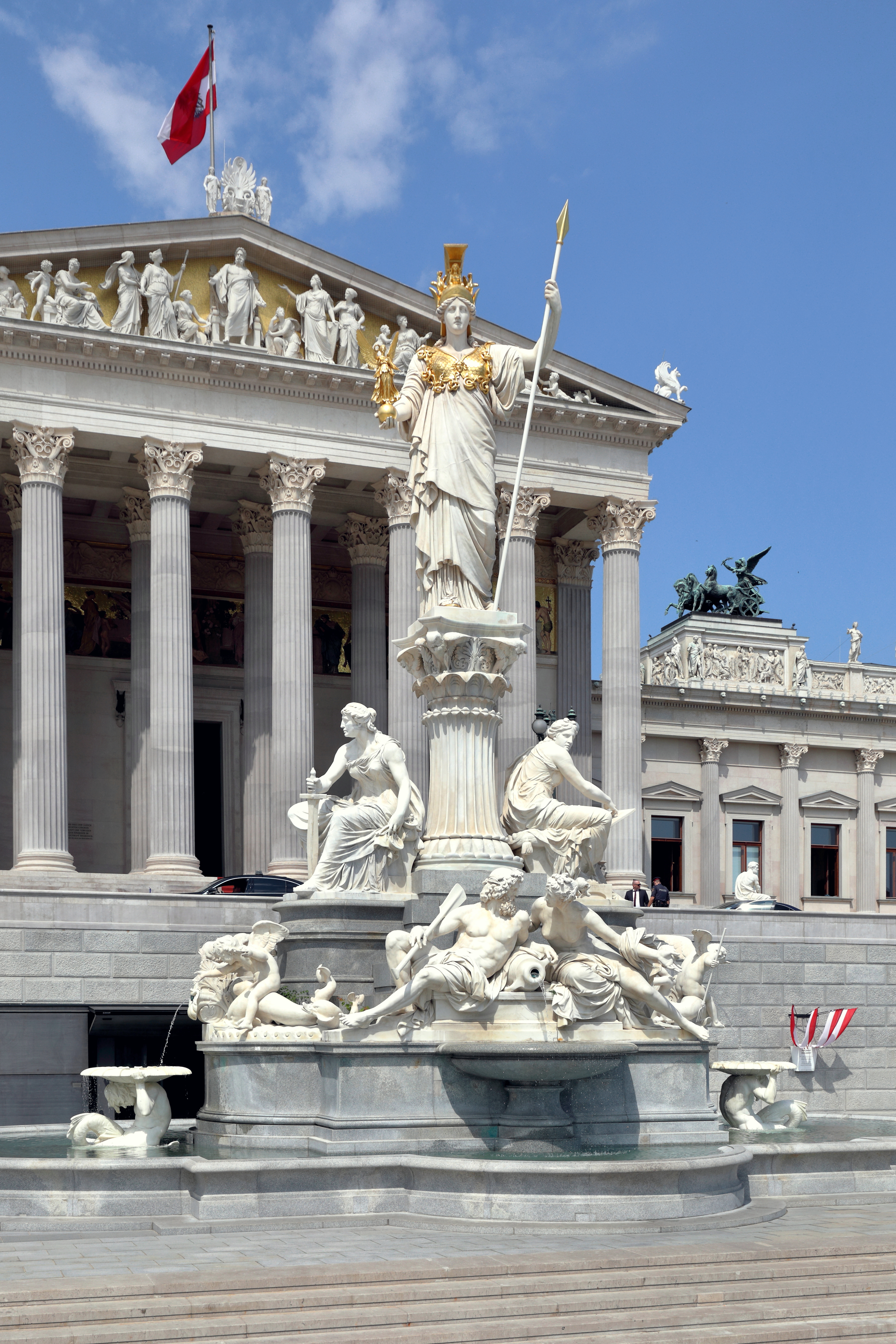
Pallas-Athena-Brunnen in front of parliament

The Athena Fountain (Pallas-Athene-Brunnen) in front of the Parliament was erected between 1893 and 1902 by Carl Kundmann, Josef Tautenhayn and Hugo Haerdtl, based on plans by Baron von Hansen. In the middle is a water basin and a richly decorated base. The four figures lying at the foot of Athena are allegorical representations of the four most important rivers of the Austro-Hungarian Empire. They represent at the front the Danube and Inn, in the back the Elbe and Vltava (German: Moldau) rivers. On the sides, little cupids ride dolphins. The statues of the Danube, Inn, and the cupids were executed by Haerdtl, those of the Elbe and Moldau by Kundmann. The female statues above represent the legislative and executive powers of the state and were executed by Tautenhayn. They are again dominated by the Goddess of Wisdom, Athena, standing on a pillar. Athena is dressed in armour with a gilded helmet; her left-hand carries a spear, while her right carries Nike.

=== Grounds ===
The building is surrounded by greenery. On the north side, the Rathausplatz, a park is located, while on the southern side, there is a small lawn next to the Justizpalast. Monuments to the founders of the First Republic as well as to Dr. Karl Renner are located on either end.

== Interior ==
=== The entrance ===
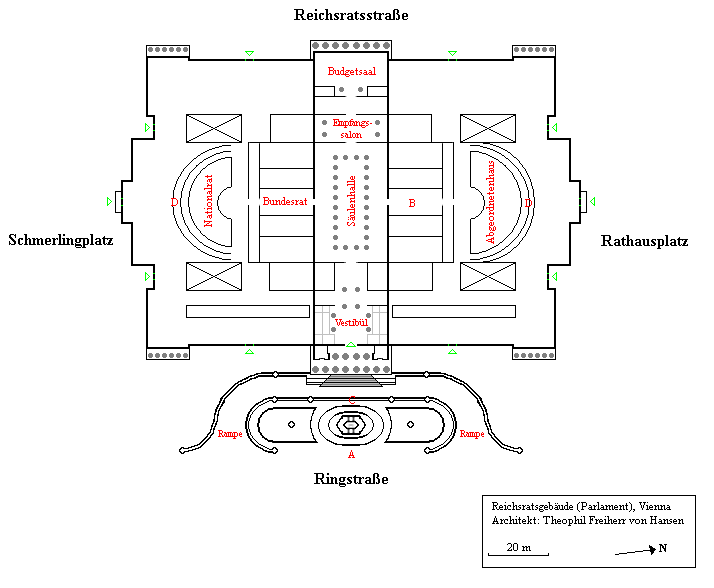
Layout of the Austrian Parliament Building. Click on the image for a key to the annotations.

The middle axis from east to west is divided into an entrance hall, vestibule, atrium, peristyle, and two large rooms at the far end. For the interior decoration, von Hansen used Greek architectural elements such as Doric, Ionic and Corinthian pillars, and in the two rooms Pompeii-style stucco technique for the walls.

The main entrance at the portico is an exact copy of the gate of the Erechtheion on the Acropolis of Athens, fitted with a bronze portal. From the main entrance at the Ringstraße one passes into the vestibule of the building, which contains Ionic pillars. The walls are decorated with Pavonazzo marble. The niches contain statues of Greek gods. Seen from the entrance starting from the left these are Apollo, Athena, Zeus, Hera, and Hephaestus, and from the right Hermes, Demeter, Poseidon, Artemis and Ares.

Above the niches with the gods is a frieze, more than 100 m long, by the Viennese artist Alois Hans Schram. It runs along the corridor, continuing into the atrium, and contains an allegorical depiction of the blessing of Peace, of the civic Virtues, and of Patriotism.

Above the entrance that leads to the Hall of Pillars (Säulenhalle) is a frieze with an allegorical depiction of Austria on her throne. Representing the motto "Goods and Blood for thy country" (Gut und Blut furs Vaterland), warriors swear loyalty and women bring offerings.

=== Hall of Pillars ===
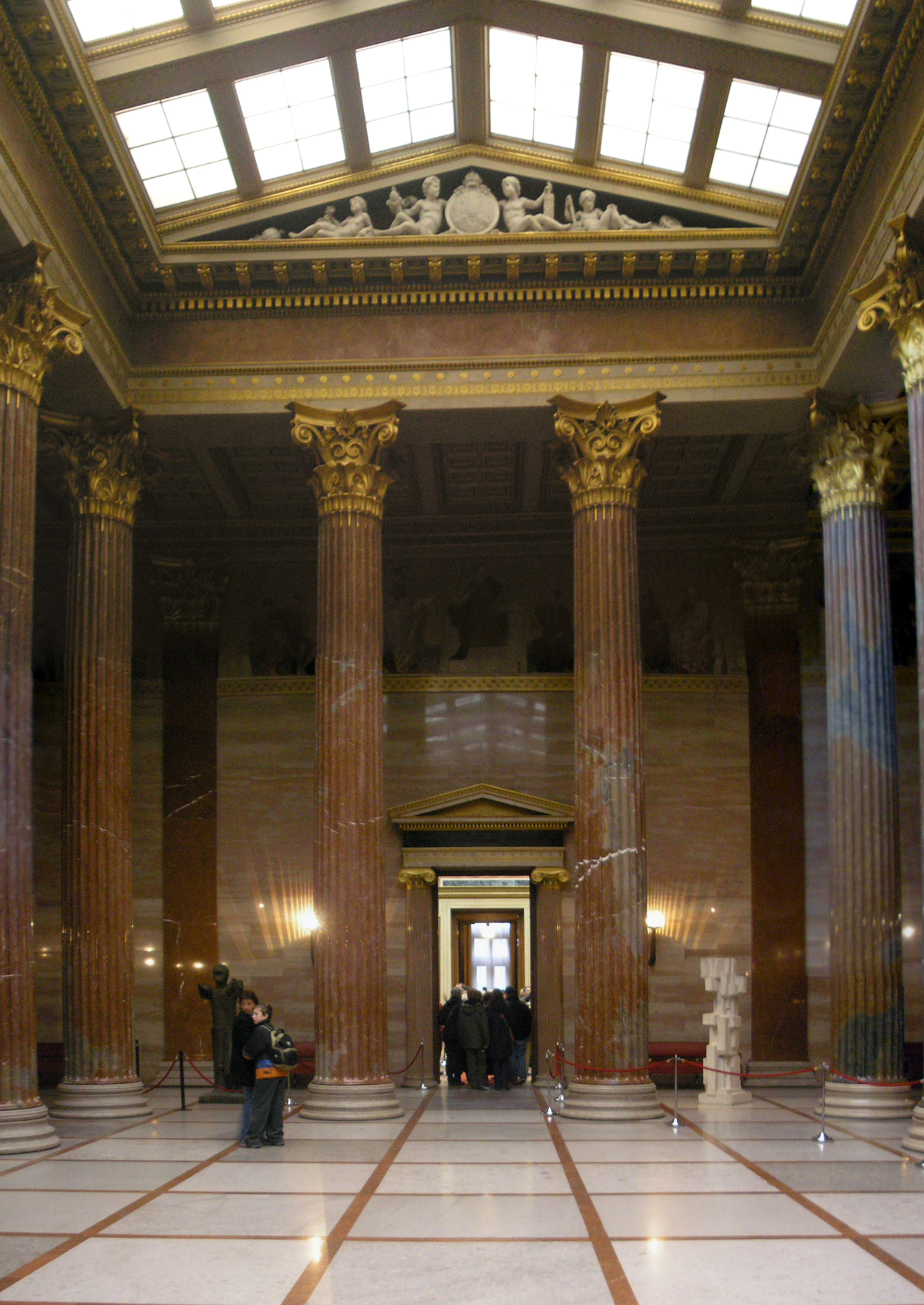
Image of the Columned Hall of the Austrian Parliament Building

Located behind the entrance atrium is the grand Hall of Pillars (Säulenhalle) or peristyle. The hall is about 40 m long and 23 m wide. The 24 Corinthian pillars are made of Adnet marble, and all of them are monoliths weighing around 16 tons each. The pillars carry the skylighted main ceiling in the middle and the coffered side ceilings. The floor is made of polished marble resting on a concrete hull. The space below was designed as a hypocaust for a floor heating and air circulation system for the hall.

Located on the transverse axis at the end of the Hall of Pillars are the chamber of the former House of Representatives (on the left) and the chamber of the former House of Lords (on the right). Von Hansen's idea was to have the Hall of Pillars as the main central part of the building. It was designed to act as a meeting point between the House of Lords and the House of Representatives. Hansen also wanted to have the hall used by the monarch for the State Opening of Parliament and the Speech from the Throne, similar to the British tradition. However, such ceremonies were never held in the building, since Emperor Franz Joseph I had a personal disdain for the parliamentary body. Speeches from the Throne in front of the parliamentarians were held in the Hofburg Palace instead.

The architect von Hansen paid particular attention to the design and construction of this hall. The marble floor was polished in a complicated process. The capitals of the pillars were gilded with 23 carat (96%) gold. Running around the wall was a frieze which was 126 m long and 2.3 m high. It was designed and painted by Eduard Lebiedzki. The monumental piece of work took decades to prepare and design, and four years, from 1907 until 1911, to paint. The frieze showed allegories depicting the duties of parliament on a golden background.

The hall was heavily damaged by aerial bombardments by Allied forces during World War II. On February 7, 1945, the hall suffered direct hits by aerial bombs. At least two pillars and the skylight were completely destroyed. The gilded coffered side ceilings under which the frieze ran on the walls were almost completely destroyed. The few surviving parts of the frieze were removed and stored. Only in the 1990s were the surviving parts restored as much as possible.

Because of its representative character, the Hall of Pillars is presently used by the President of the National Council and the Federal Council for festive functions, as well as for traditional parliamentary receptions.

Located at the back of the Hall of Pillars is the reception salon (Empfangssalon) of the President of the National Council. The room is fitted with Pompeian wall decorations in stucco and a large glass skylight. Hanging on the wall are portraits of the Presidents of the National Council since 1945.

Further behind the reception salon is the former reception hall for both chambers of the Imperial Council. It is used today for committee meetings and hearings on financial, state budget, and audit court matters by the National Council, thus being presently named the Budgetsaal. The hall is richly decorated with marble, stucco, and a rich coffered ceiling in the Renaissance style. Inlaid into the ceiling are the coat of arms of the 17 Kronländer, kingdoms and territories represented in the Imperial Council.

=== Former House of Representatives Chamber ===
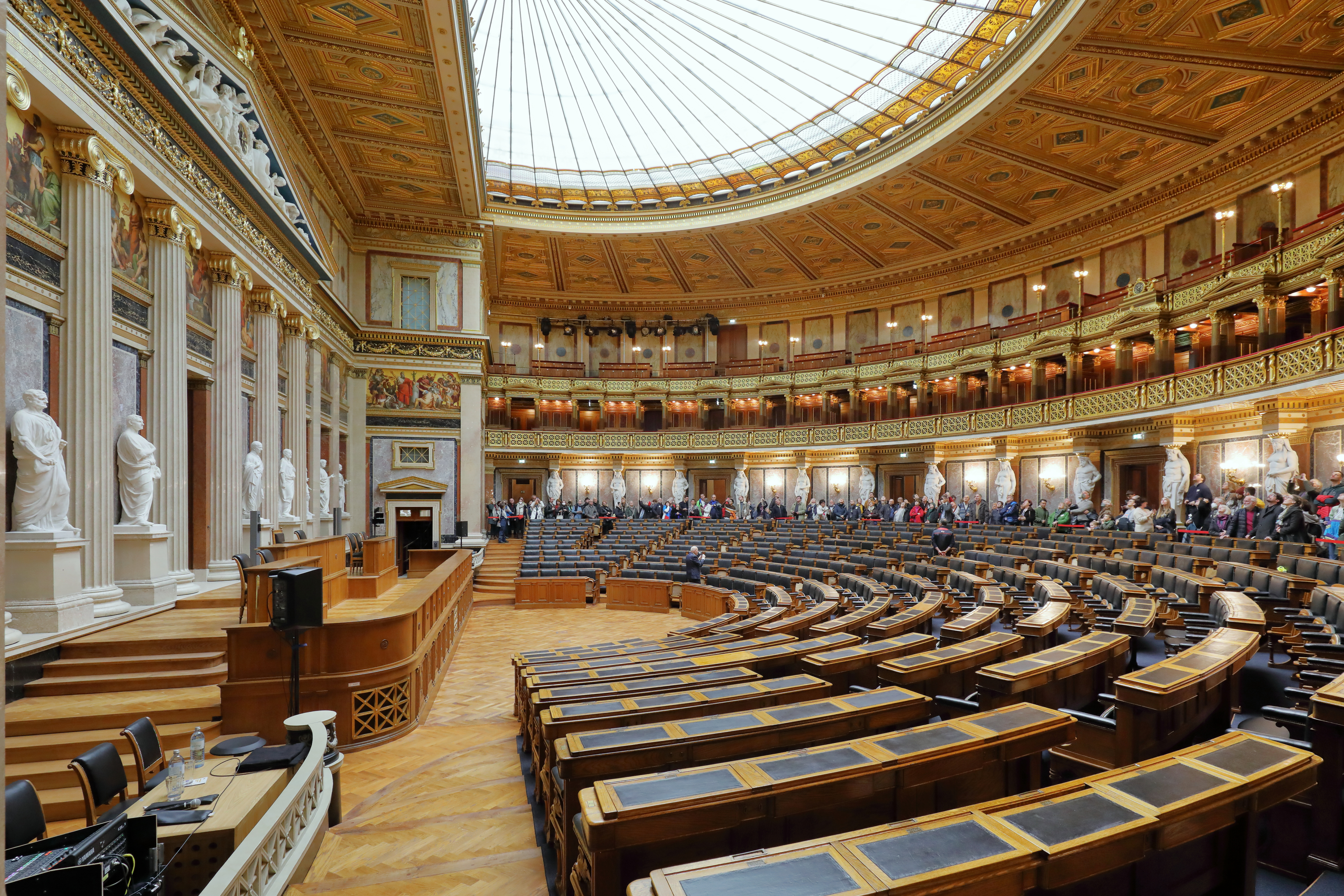
Debating Chamber of the former House of Deputies of Austria

The chamber of the former House of Deputies (Abgeordnetenhaus) is used today by the Federal Assembly (Bundesversammlung) whenever it convenes for special occasions such as National Day and the inauguration ceremony of a newly elected Federal President of Austria. The chamber is built in a semicircle of 34 m diameter and 22.5 m depth.

It originally contained 364 seats. With the introduction of various electoral reforms, the number was increased to 425 seats in 1896 and with the introduction of male universal suffrage in 1907 to 516 seats.

The chamber has viewing galleries on two levels. The first gallery has in the middle a box for the head of state. The right side of the gallery is for the diplomatic corps and the left side for the cabinet and family members of the head of state. On both far ends are seats for journalists. The gallery on the second level, which is slightly recessed from the one on the first level, is for the general public.

The chamber is architecturally based on an ancient Greek theatron. The wall behind the presidium is designed like an antique skene with marble colonnades that carry a gable.

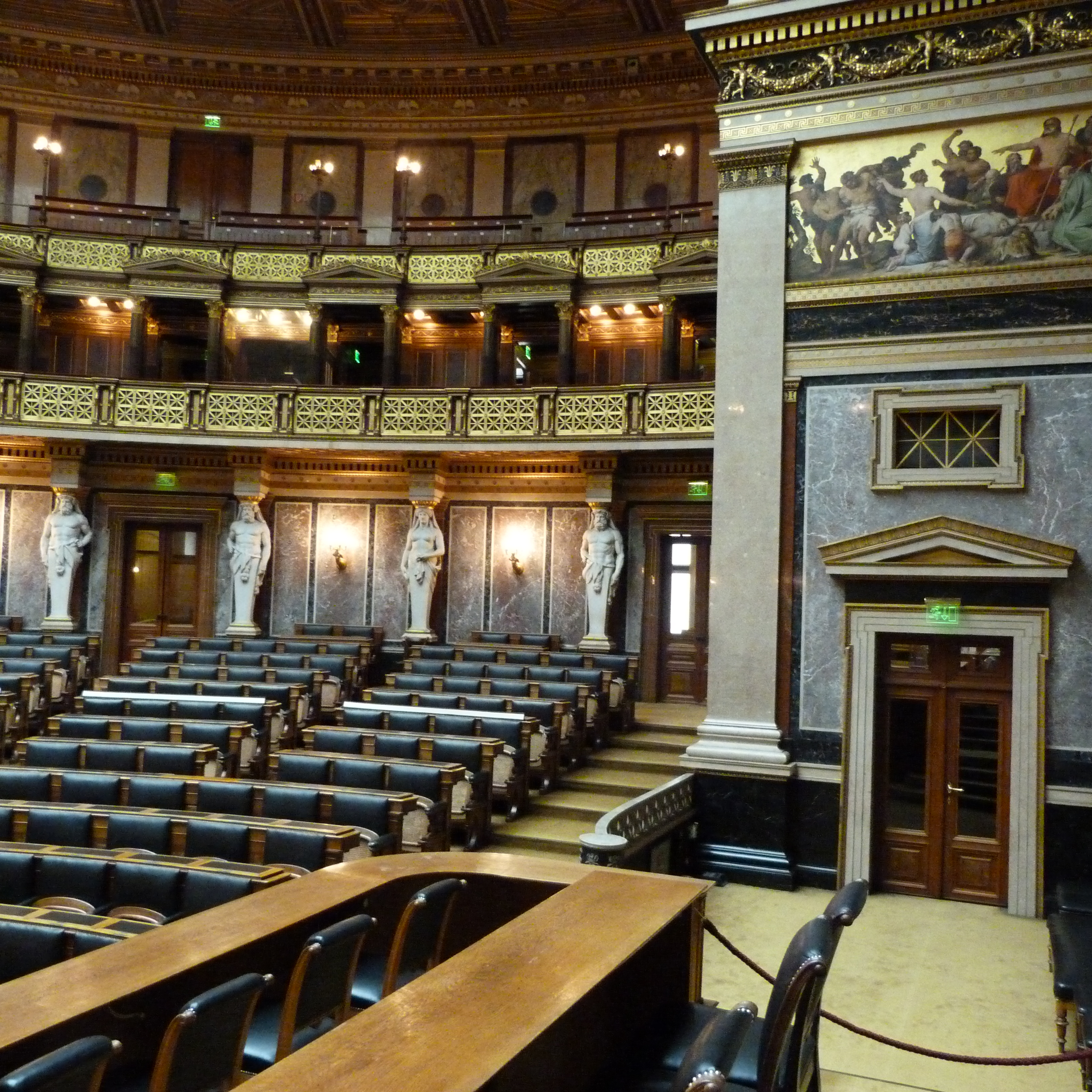
Marble Colonnade

The group of figures in the gable are made of Laas marble and depict the allegorical times of the day. The columns and pilasters of the wall are made of marble from Untersberg, the stylobates of dark marble, the decorations of the doors of red Salzburg marble. The wall space between the pillars is made of grey scagliola, with niches in between decorated with statues made of Carrara marble. The statues show historical persons such as Numa Pompilius, Cincinnatus, Quintus Fabius Maximus, Cato the Elder, Gaius Gracchus, Cicero, Manlius Torquatus, Augustus, Seneca the Younger and Constantine the Great. The friezes above were painted by August Eisenmenger and depict the history of the emergence of civic life. Starting from left to right it shows:

1. Kampf der Kentauren und Lapithen (Battle of the Centaurs and Lapithes)
2. Minos richtet nach eigenem Ermessen (Minos judges according to his own discretion)
3. Einsetzung der Volksvertretung in Sparta (Swearing-in of the representatives of Sparta)
4. Brutus verurteilt seine Söhne (Brutus condemns his sons)
5. Menenius Agrippa versöhnt die Stände (Menenius Agrippa reconciles the estates)
6. Sophokles im Wettkampf mit Aischylos (Sophokles in competition with Aischylos)
7. Sokrates auf dem Markte von Athen (Sokrates visiting the market of Athens)
8. Anordnung der Prachtbauten durch Perikles (The order of the representative buildings through Pericles. Note: the head of Pericles actually has the features of Baron Theophil von Hansen)
9. Herodot in Olympia
10. Plato lehrt die Gesetze (Plato teaches law)
11. Demosthenes redet zum Volke (Demosthenes addresses the people)
12. Decius Mus weiht sich dem Tode (Decius Mus dedicates himself to death)
13. Caius Gracchus auf der Rednertribüne (Caius Gracchus holds a speech from the speaker's platform)
14. Solon läßt die Athener auf die Gesetze schwören (Solon has the Athenians swear on the laws)
15. der Friede (Peace)

The chamber of the House of Representatives was important for the history of the Austro-Hungarian Empire. Many politicians started their career as deputies, such as Karl Renner, later chancellor and president of Austria, and Leopold Kunschak, later conservative leader. Other deputies from outside core Austria played important roles in their native countries after the First and Second World Wars.

Important politicians who started their career and had their first democratic experience later played important roles in their native countries after the end of the Austro-Hungarian Empire. These include:

In Austria

- Karl Renner, former deputy of Moravia, later Federal Chancellor and President of Austria
- Leopold Kunschak, former deputy of Lower Austria, later Austrian conservative leader

In Czechoslovakia

- Tomáš Masaryk, former delegate from Bohemia, later first President of Czechoslovakia
- Karel Kramář, former delegate from Bohemia, later first Prime Minister of Czechoslovakia
- Vlastimil Tusar, former delegate from Bohemia, later Prime Minister of Czechoslovakia und
- Bohumír Šmeral, former delegate from Bohemia, later Czechoslovak Communist leader,

in Poland

- Ignacy Daszyński, former delegate from Galicia, later Sejm Marshal of the Second Polish Republic,
- Wincenty Witos, former delegate from Galicia, later Prime Minister of Poland,

in Italy

- Alcide De Gasperi, former delegate from the Tyrol, later Prime Minister of Italy,

in Yugoslavia

- Anton Korošec, former delegate from Styria, later Prime Minister of Yugoslavia

in Ukraine

- Yevhen Petrushevych, former delegate from Galicia, later President of Western Ukrainian People's Republic
- Kost Levytskyi, former delegate from Galicia, later Head of the Government of Western Ukrainian People's Republic

The Austrian Imperial Council (Reichsrat) was the recruiting school for central and southeastern democracy and socialism.

=== National Council Chamber ===
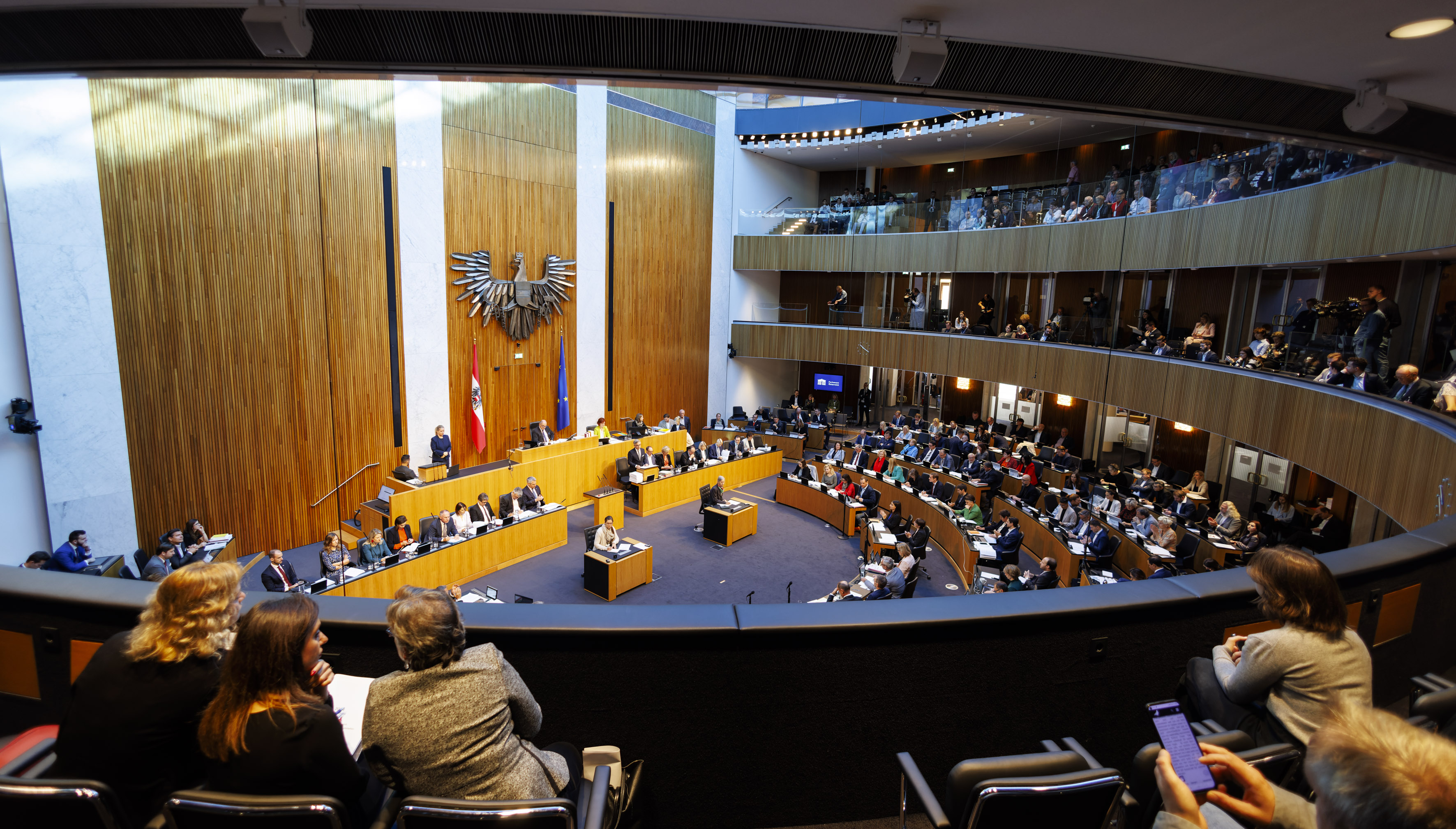
National Council Chamber

Since 1920, the former meeting room of the House of Lords has been used as a plenary meeting room by the National Council. The House of Lords (Herrenhaus) used to have its chamber where today the National Council convenes. The chamber was designed in the classical style, with a horseshoe-shaped seating arrangement facing the chair. The Chamber of the National Council was destroyed in 1945 during aerial bombardments and was completely rebuilt in a modern style.

The new chamber was completed in 1956 and is a typical example of 1950s architecture. Apart from the coat of arms made of steel, the chamber is without decoration. The carpet is mint-green, considered to be neutral at the time since it was not the colour of any political party. Green was also said to have a soothing effect, something that apparently weighed in the decision, considering the tumultuous debates the building had to endure before the two World Wars. Behind the speaker's pult is the government bench (Regierungsbank), which is however only fully occupied during important events such as the declaration of the government (Regierungserklärung) or the state budget speech (Budgetrede).

=== Federal Council Chamber ===
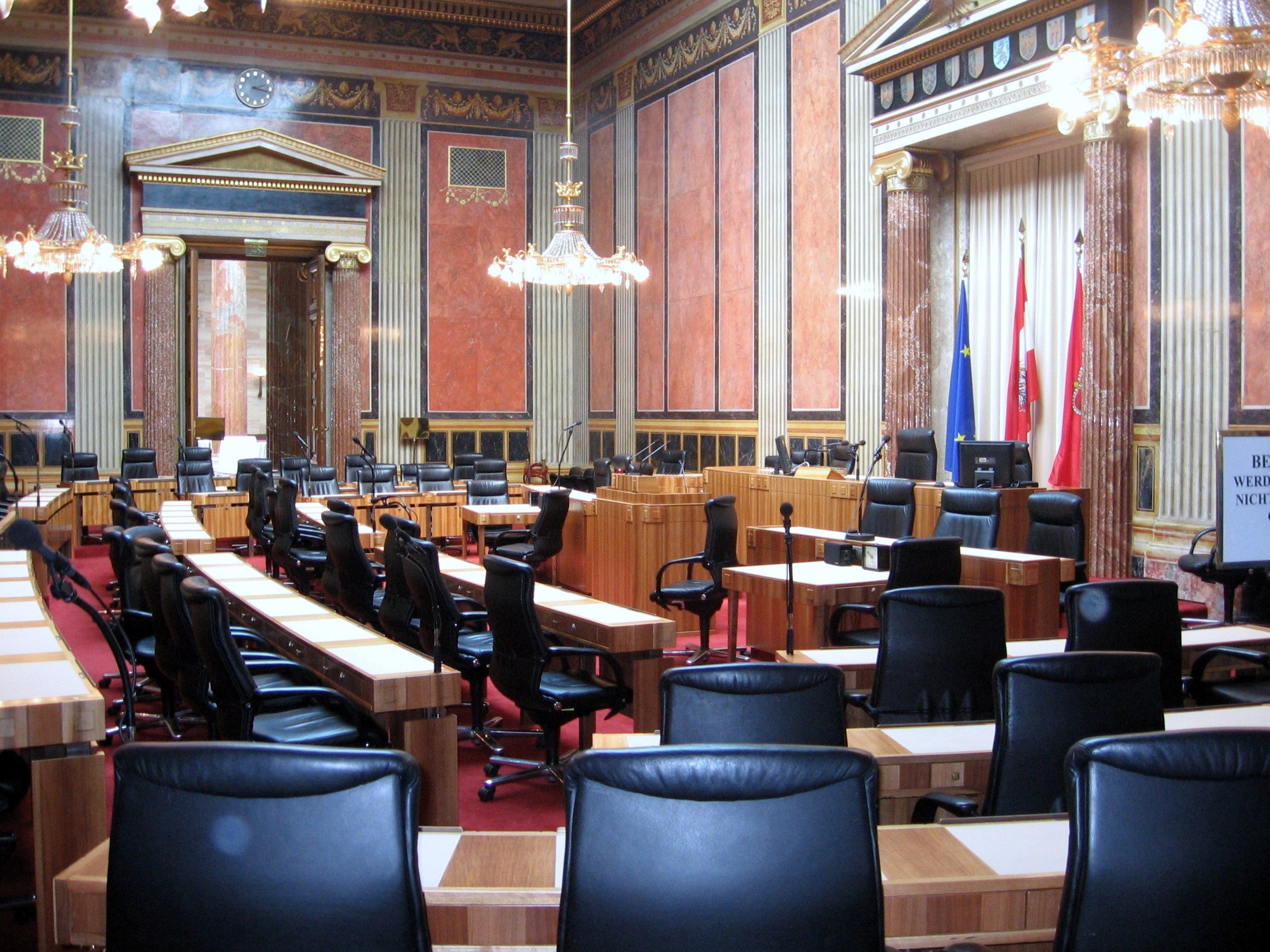
Chamber of the Federal Council (Bundesrat)

Located next to the Chamber of the former House of Lords is the current Chamber of the Federal Council of Austria (Bundesrat). The room was used by the Lords as an antechamber and informal meeting room. After the end of the Austro-Hungarian Empire and the new republican constitution in 1920, the former Lords room became the Chamber for the Federal Council.

The seating arrangement of the present Chamber of the Federal Council is similar to the other two great chamber halls. Member of the Federal Council sit in a semicircle facing the presidium. In front of the presidium is the cabinet bench. The furniture was completely renewed in 1999. In 1970, the coat of arms of Austria as well as of the nine Austrian states was installed above the presidium.

== Culture and tourism ==
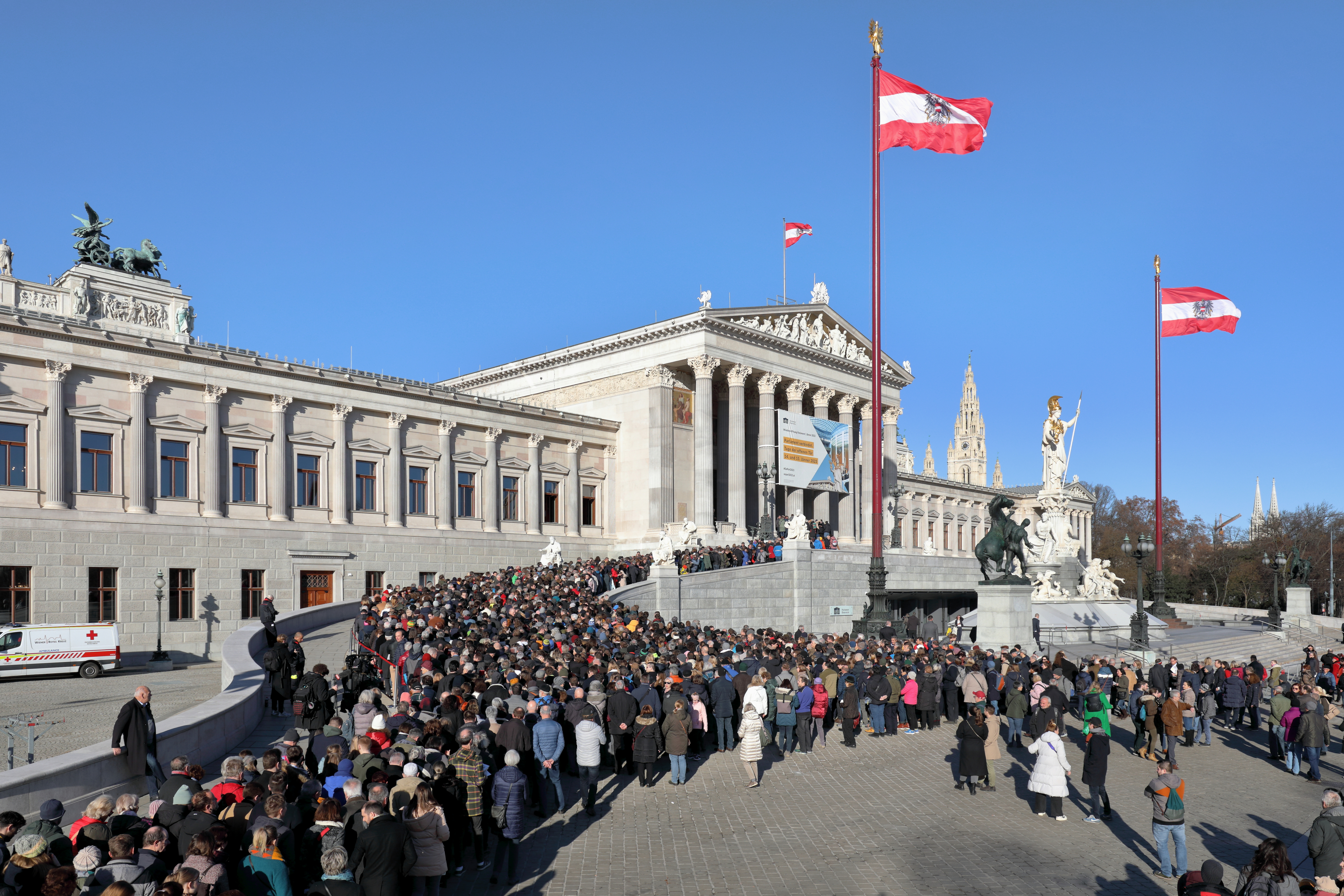
People waiting in line at the Austrian Parliament Building on the open day, January 14th, 2023

The exterior of the Austrian Parliament—especially the statue and fountain of Athena—is one of the most visited tourist attractions in Vienna. The United Nations Educational, Scientific and Cultural Organization (UNESCO) classifies the inner city of Vienna, including the Ringstraße and thus the Parliament Building as a World Heritage Site. It is also a Grade I listed building.

A visitors' centre opened in October 2005. Visitors could now enter the building not from the old side entrance, but from the front at ground level.

The Parliament Building has been the main motif in several commemorative coins, including the 60 Years of the Second Republic commemorative coin issued in 2005.

== See also ==
- Imperial Council (Austria)
