= Dřenice =

- Municipality
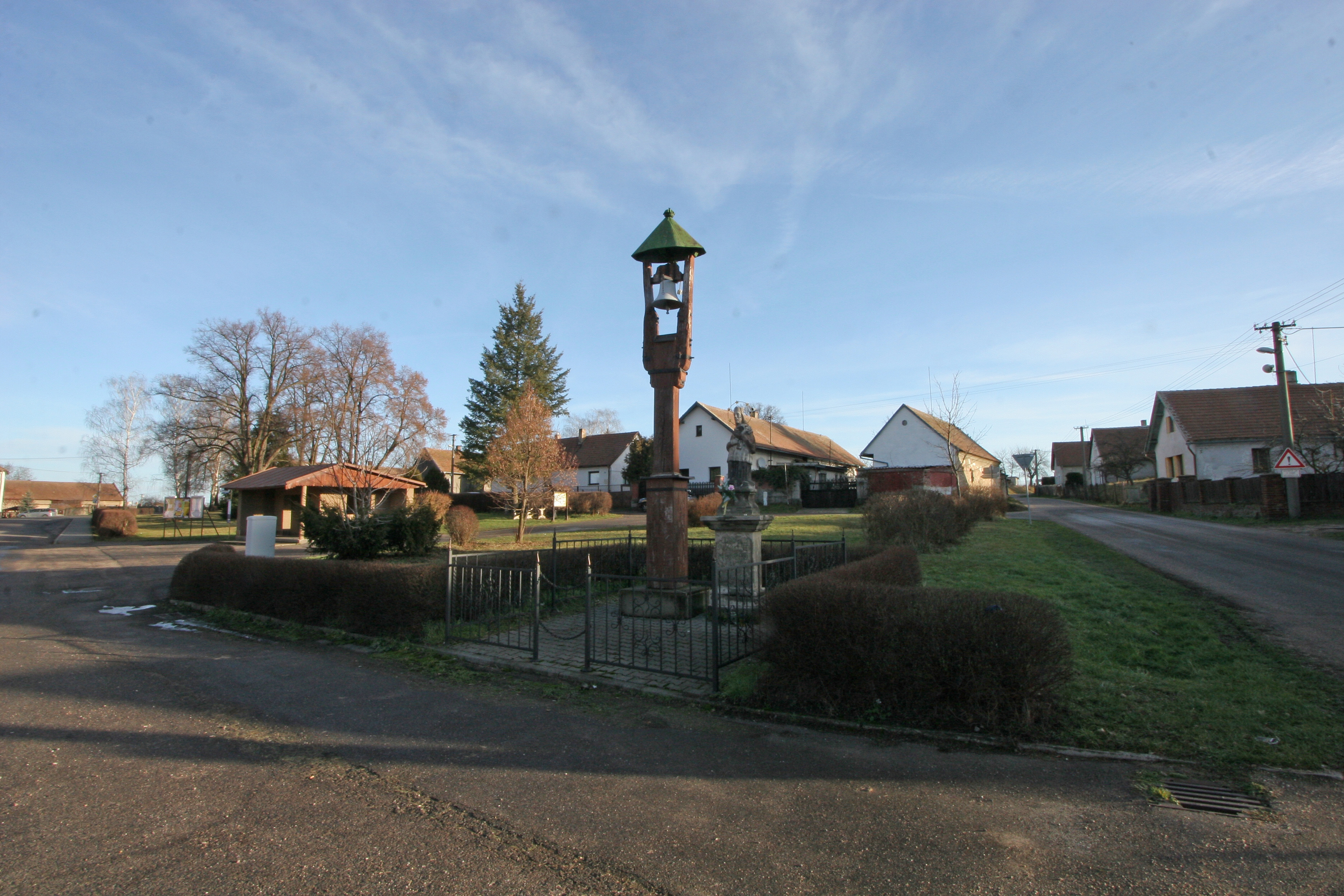
- Centre of Dřenice

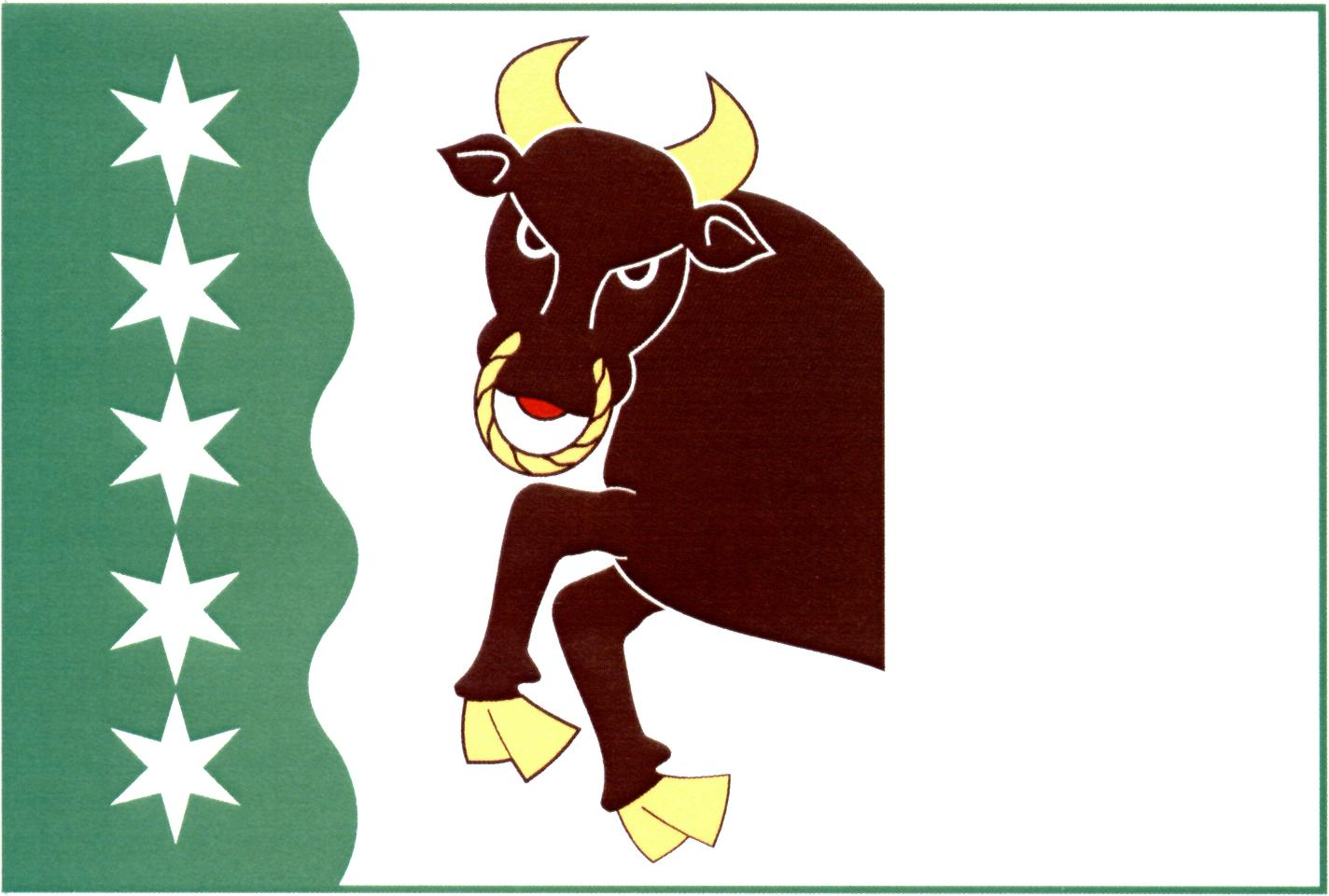
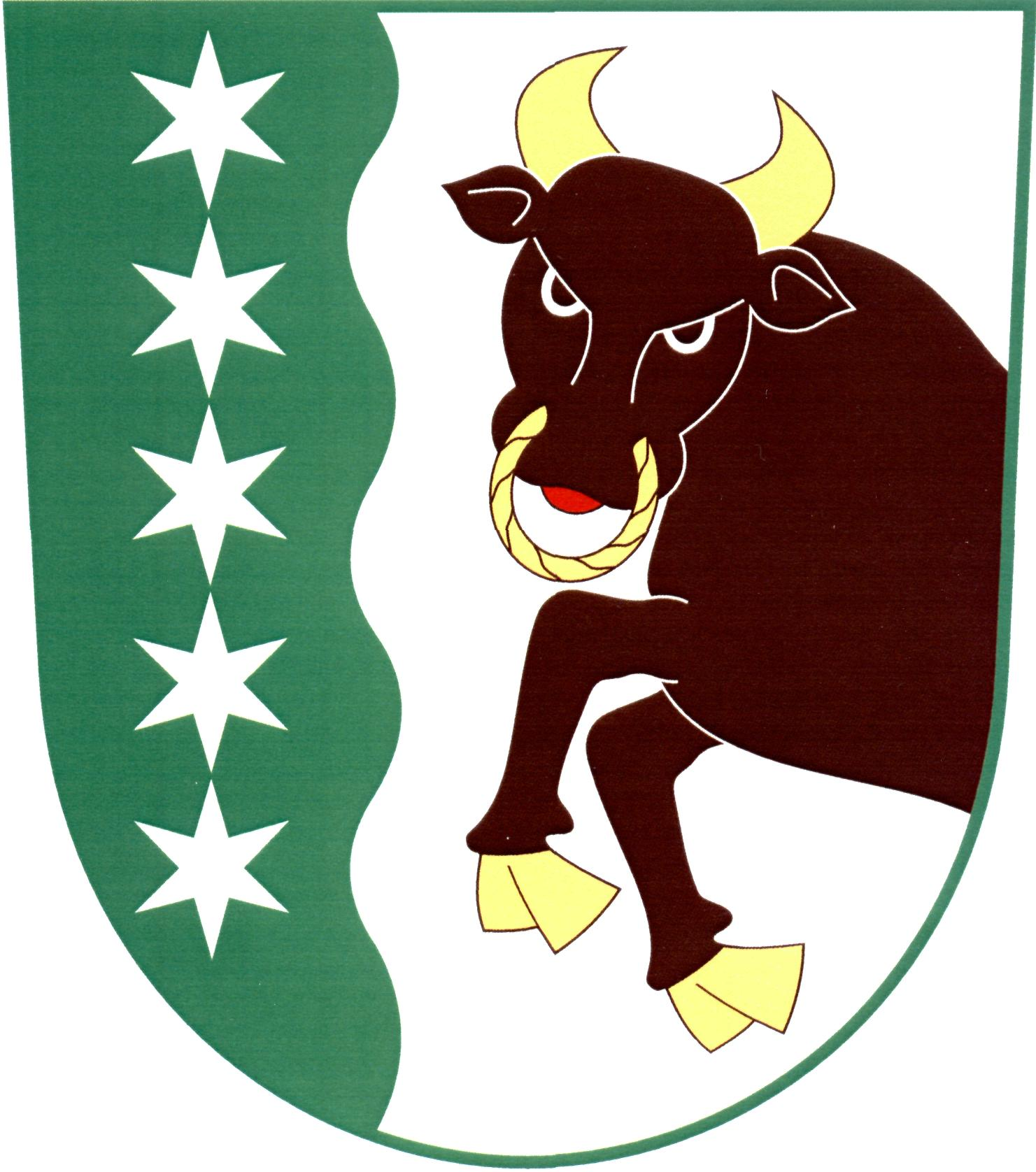
- Flag Coat of arms

- Location in the Czech Republic
- Coordinates: 49°58′57″N 15°44′44″E
- Country: Czech Republic
- Region: Pardubice
- District: Chrudim
- First mentioned: 1381

Area
  - Total: 2.55 km^{2} (0.98 sq mi)
- Elevation: 245 m (804 ft)

Population (2026-01-01)
  - Total: 413
  - Density: 162/km^{2} (419/sq mi)
- Time zone: UTC+1 (CET)
  - Summer (DST): UTC+2 (CEST)
- Postal code: 537 01
- Website: www.drenice.cz

Dřenice is a municipality and village in Chrudim District in the Pardubice Region of the Czech Republic. It has about 400 inhabitants.

== Demographics ==
Historical population
Year	Pop.	±%
1869	569	—
1880	691	+21.4%
1890	700	+1.3%
1900	602	−14.0%
1910	567	−5.8%
1921	546	−3.7%
1930	523	−4.2%
1950	485	−7.3%
1961	433	−10.7%
1970	385	−11.1%
1980	350	−9.1%
1991	321	−8.3%
2001	308	−4.0%
2011	359	+16.6%
2021	430	+19.8%
Source: Censuses

== Notable people ==
- Wilhelm Jerusalem (1854–1923), Austrian philosopher
