= Max Winter (politician) =

Austrian journalist and politician (1870–1937)

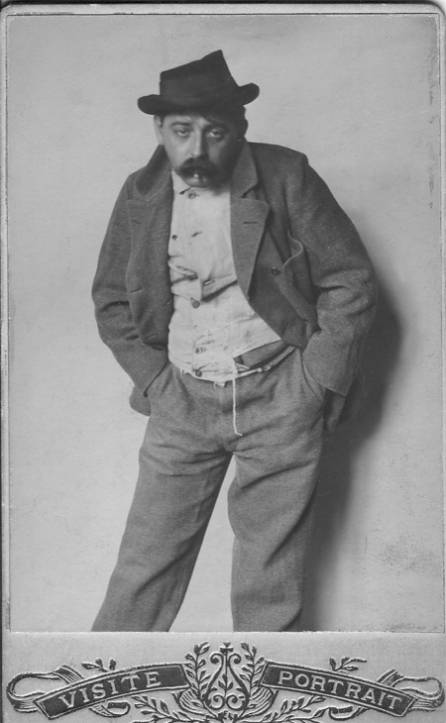
- Max Winter dressed as homeless for a reportage on "Strotter" (scavengers) in 1902 for the newspaper "Wiener Arbeiterzeitung".
- Born: January 9, 1870; Tárnok, Hungary
- Died: July 11, 1937 (aged 67); Hollywood, California, United States
- Occupation: Austrian politician

Max Winter (January 9, 1870 in Tárnok, Hungary – July 11, 1937 in Hollywood, California, United States) was an Austrian journalist, writer and politician of the SDAP. In 1923 he founded a feminist magazine, Die Unzufriedene, with Paula Hons which he edited until 1931.

He was instrumental in acquiring use of part of the Schönbrunn Palace as a school. The street Max Winter Platz in Vienna is named after him.
