= Woodcraft (disambiguation) =

Woodcraft is skill and experience at living and thriving in woods.

Woodcraft may also refer to:

- Woodworking, crafting with wood
- Woodcraft Supply, a retail store chain
- Woodcraft (youth movement)
- Woodcraft Folk a UK youth movement based on Woodcraft.
