= No. 1 Royal Crescent =

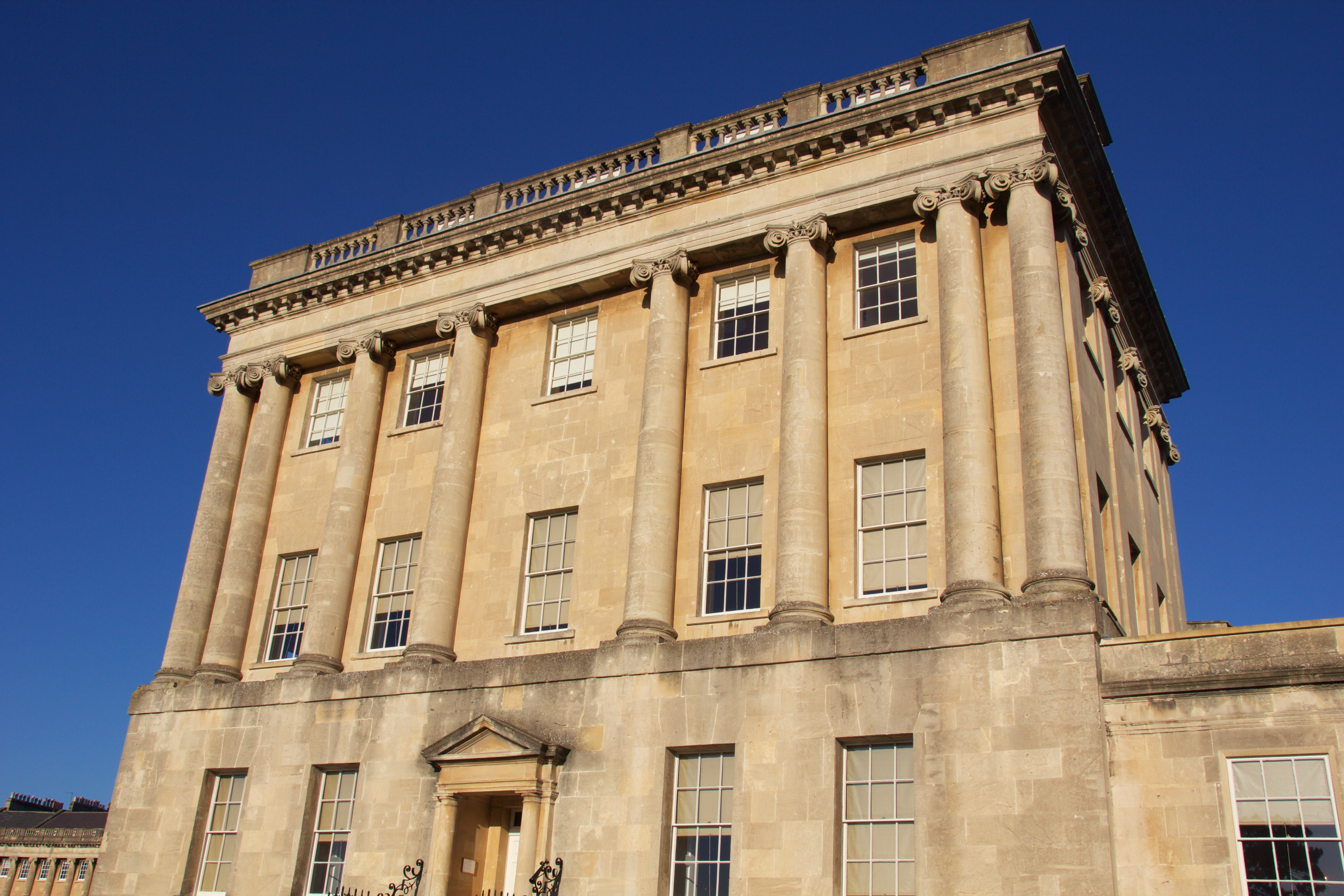

- Location within Somerset
- 51.3867°N 2.3672°W
- Type: Townhouse
- Location: Royal Crescent, Bath

History
- Built: 1767–1774
- Original use: Private residence

Site notes
- Architect: John Wood, the Younger
- Architectural styles: Georgian, Palladian
- Restored: 2012–2013
- Current use: Historic house museum
- Owner: Bath Preservation Trust
- Website: no1royalcrescent.org.uk

Listed Building – Grade I
- Official name: No. 1, Royal Crescent
- Designated: 12 June 1950
- Part of: Nos. 1-30, Royal Crescent
- Reference no.: 1394736

Listed Building – Grade II
- Official name: 1A, Royal Crescent
- Designated: 5 August 1975
- Reference no.: 1394740

No. 1 Royal Crescent is the first building at the eastern end of the Royal Crescent in Bath, Somerset, and is of national architectural and historic importance. It is currently the headquarters of the conservation charity, the Bath Preservation Trust, and also operates as a public "historic house" museum displaying authentic room sets, furniture, pictures and other items illustrating Georgian domestic life both 'above stairs' and 'below stairs'. The house was the subject of a major renovation project during 2012 and 2013 (The Whole Story Project) which reunited No. 1 with its original service wing at No. 1A, from which it had been separated during the 20th century.

== History ==
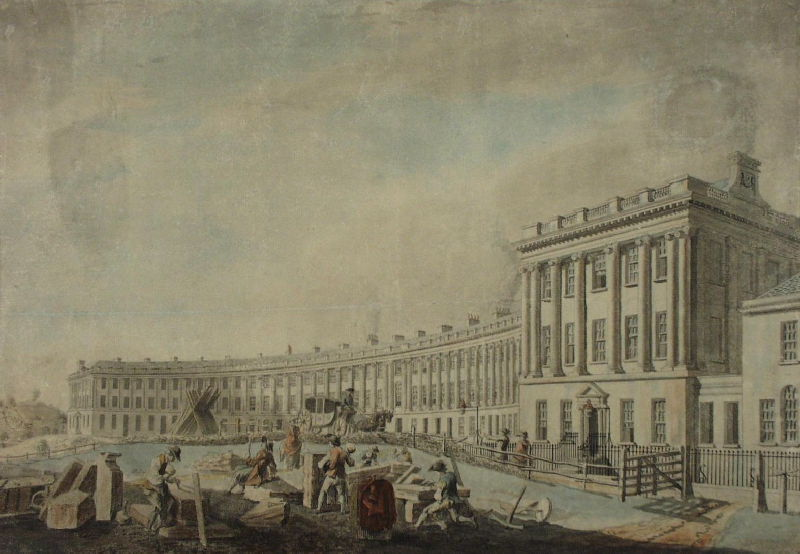
The completion of the building work in 1769; No. 1 is shown at the right-end.

No. 1 stands as the cornerstone of one of the Royal Crescent, built by John Wood, the Younger between 1767 and 1774: one of the most significant urban architectural achievements of the 18th century. No. 1 is one of the UK's most important buildings, representing the highest point of Palladian architecture in Bath. It has a symmetrical five-window front with a central Doric doorcase. The first tenant was Thomas Brock in 1769 and then in 1776 Prince Frederick, Duke of York and Albany. Henry Sandford, a retired Irish Member of Parliament, was the first permanent resident and lived at the house with his family from 1777 until his death in Bath in 1796.

No. 1 Royal Crescent is a historic house museum, with most of the rooms furnished to represent life in one of the great houses of 18th century Bath. It is owned and maintained by the Bath Preservation Trust through funds provided by memberships and donors to illustrate how wealthy owners of the late 18th century might have lived in such a house. No. 1 was purchased in 1967 by Major Bernard Cayzer, a member of the family associated with the Clan shipping line. He donated the house to the Bath Preservation Trust together with an endowment towards its restoration and furnishing. During 2012 and 2013 the Trust worked to re-unite No. 1 with its original servants' wing at No. 1A Royal Crescent, part of which had once been occupied by the Victorian literary critic George Saintsbury and which had been in use as an entirely separate dwelling since the 1960s.

== Restoration ==
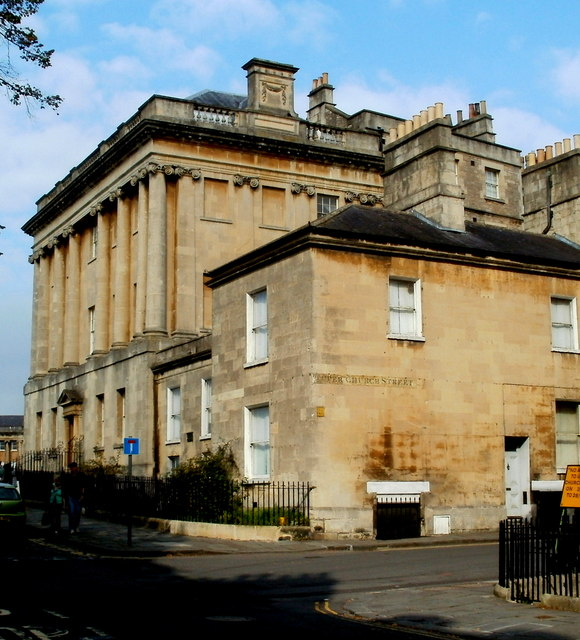
1A Royal Crescent is the smaller building to the right, which has been re-united with 1 Royal Crescent, and now forms part of the museum.

During the twentieth century the lease on No. 1 Royal Crescent was split and the building was divided into two separate properties, with the original service wing to the east being sold off as No. 1A Royal Crescent. In 2006, No. 1A Royal Crescent was purchased by the Brownsword Charitable Foundation with the intention that it should be reunited with No. 1, thereby allowing Bath Preservation Trust to return the house as far as possible to its original architectural state and to extend its operation as an historic house museum with improved educational and visitor facilities and an additional dedicated exhibition space.

With further substantial support from the Heritage Lottery Fund as well as other generous private donations and grants, the major works began in January 2012. Externally, the Venetian windows on the eastern Upper Church Street facade were restored to how they would have appeared when Jane Austen and her contemporaries strolled by in the late 18th and early 19th centuries and the door to No. 1A was re-opened in its original site. Internally, the number of Georgian dressed rooms was increased from five to ten, the original kitchens were located and restored, a learning centre for school groups was created, an exhibition gallery was opened and a new shop was installed. Disabled access has been provided in the form of a lift. The museum reopened to the public in June 2013 at a ceremony where Mary Berry cut the ribbon.

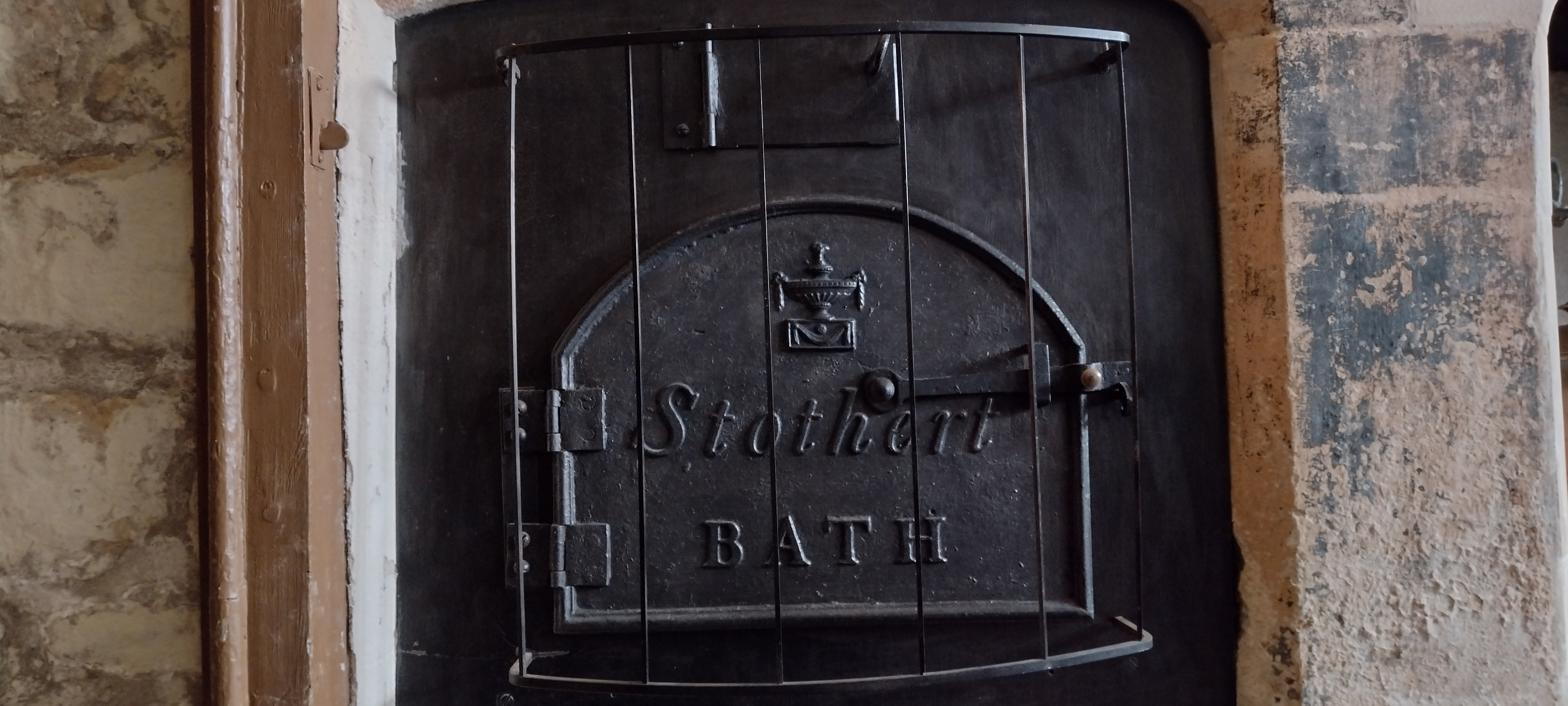
Cast iron oven by Stothert of Bath

During the project the Commonplace Books (journals/scrapbooks) of the house's first long-term resident (retired Irish MP Mr Henry Sandford) were unearthed in an Irish library, and these were used to reinterpret the house, showing his story and interests. This gives visitors a truly immersive experience of 18th century life, with a sumptuous meal laid on the dining table, the lady's and gentleman's two bedrooms set out ready for their occupants, the drawing room sparkling with mirrors, and the kitchens laid out as if the servants are busy preparing meals.

Portraits in the museum include those of Alexander Pope, Ralph Allen, Field Marshall George Wade, John Vivian of Claverton and Thomas Betterton amongst others.

== Bath Preservation Trust headquarters ==
The Bath Preservation Trust has offices on the upper floors of No. 1 Royal Crescent.

== Film and television appearances ==
No. 1 has been used as a specific location or as a backdrop for a number of films and television programmes, in addition to street scenes that have been filmed in the Royal Crescent itself.

- 1964: The BBC TV series The Count of Monte Cristo starring Alan Badel and Michael Gough
- 1974: The Stanley Kubrick movie Barry Lyndon, starring Ryan O'Neal, Marisa Berenson, Patrick Magee, Hardy Kruger, Murray Melvin, André Morell, Leonard Rossiter and Michael Hordern was filmed outside No. 1 (including removing the lamp-post and erecting wooden building scaffolds). Some TV broadcast versions have been edited to remove the Bath scenes.
- 1976: The movie Joseph Andrews, directed by Tony Richardson and starring Peter Firth and Wendy Craig was filmed inside and outside No. 1
- 1983: Auberon Waugh narrated a history of the Royal Crescent, which "not only looks at the historical background of a world-famous masterpiece, but also examines what lies behind its impressive facade today. Above all he finds living in one of the grandest addresses in Europe - amid a throng of tourists - can be rather like living in a goldfish bowl." (Radio Times 27.5.83 and 2.9.83).
- 1987: The BBC TV series of Jane Austen's Northanger Abbey starring Peter Firth and Robert Hardy was filmed inside and outside No. 1.
- 2000: The public service broadcasting movie Evolution, Part 1: Darwin's Dangerous Idea, directed by Alastair Reid, was filmed inside and outside No. 1
- 2014: BBC TV's Countryfile Christmas Special included a scene filmed inside No. 1
- 2016: An episode of Series 7 of Michael Portillo's Great British Railway Journeys (Stroud to Bath) was filmed in the house in 2015 and was first shown on BBC TV on 20 January 2016.
- 2019: The Netflix drama Bridgerton featured No. 1 as the house belonging to the Featherington family.
