= Royal Crescent =

Georgian crescent in Bath, Somerset

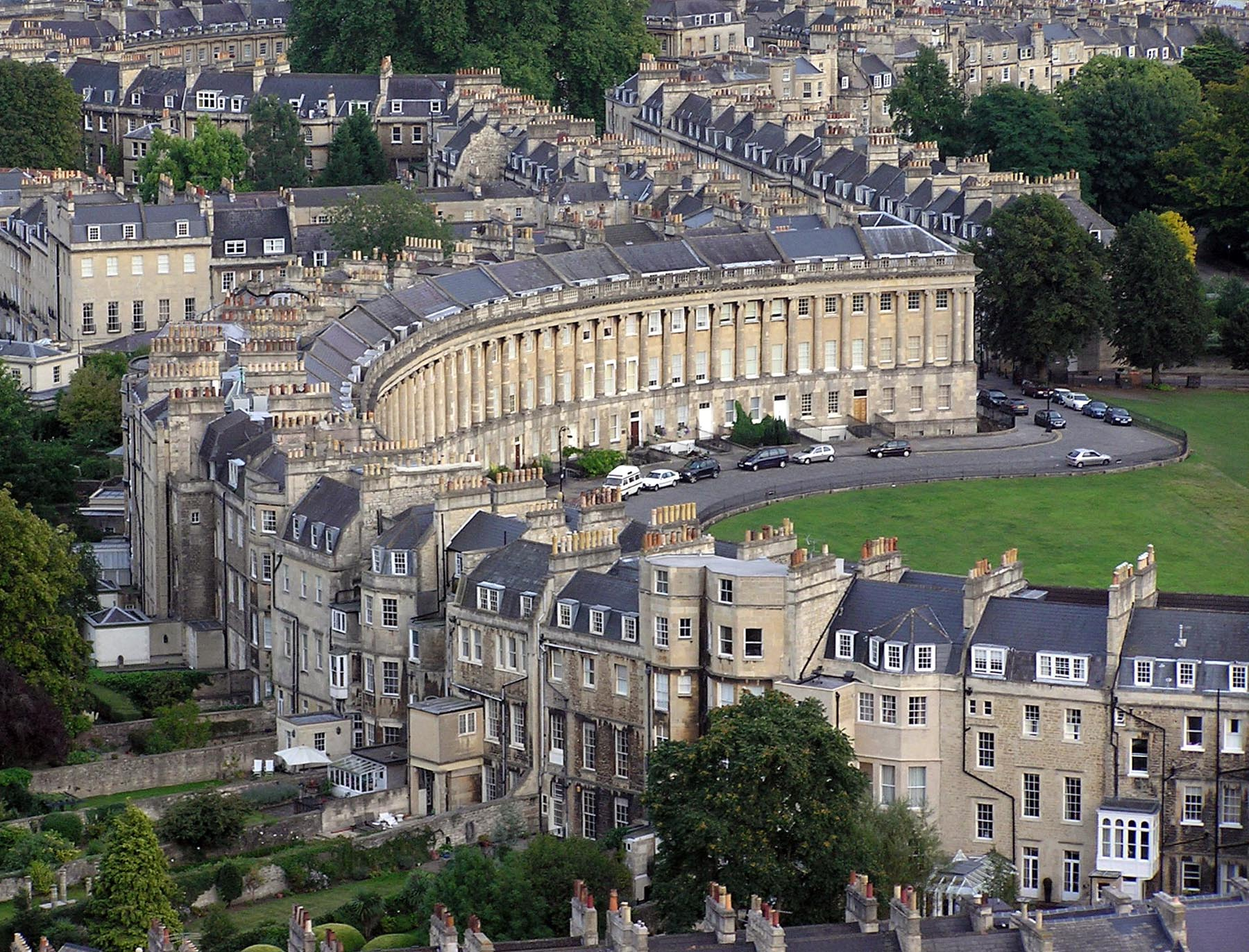
- Royal Crescent from a hot air balloon, contrasting its uniform public front façade against its more architecturally varied private rear.

- Location within Somerset
- 51°23′13″N 2°22′06″W
- Location: Bath, Somerset, England

History
- Built: 1767–1774

Site notes
- Architect: John Wood, the Younger
- Architectural style: Georgian
- Current use: Private residences

Listed Building – Grade I
- Official name: Nos. 1–30, Royal Crescent
- Designated: 12 June 1950
- Reference no.: 1394736

Listed Building – Grade II
- Official name: Five lamp columns
- Designated: 15 October 2010
- Reference no.: 1394739

Listed Building – Grade II
- Official name: 1A, Royal Crescent
- Designated: 5 August 1975
- Reference no.: 1394740

The Royal Crescent is a row of 30 terraced houses laid out in a sweeping crescent in the city of Bath, England. Designed by the architect John Wood, the Younger, and built between 1767 and 1774, it is among the greatest examples of Georgian architecture to be found in the United Kingdom and is a Grade I listed building. Although some changes have been made to the various interiors over the years, the Georgian stone facade remains much as it was when first built.

The 500-foot-long (150 m) crescent has 114 Ionic columns on the first floor with an entablature in a Palladian style above. It was the first crescent of terraced houses to be built and an example of "rus in urbe" (the country in the city) with its views over the parkland opposite.

Many notable people have either lived or stayed in the Royal Crescent since it was built over 250 years ago, and some are commemorated on special plaques attached to the relevant buildings. Of the crescent's 30 townhouses, 10 are still full-size townhouses; 18 have been split into flats of various sizes; One is the No. 1 Royal Crescent museum, and The Royal Crescent Hotel & Spa, at the centre of the crescent, is made up of No. 16 and No.15.

== Design and construction ==
The street that is known today as "the Royal Crescent" was originally named "The Crescent." It is claimed that the adjective "Royal" was added at the end of the 18th century after Prince Frederick, Duke of York and Albany had stayed there. He initially rented number one and later bought number 16. The Royal Crescent is close to Victoria Park and linked via Brock Street to The Circus which had been designed by John Wood, the Elder.

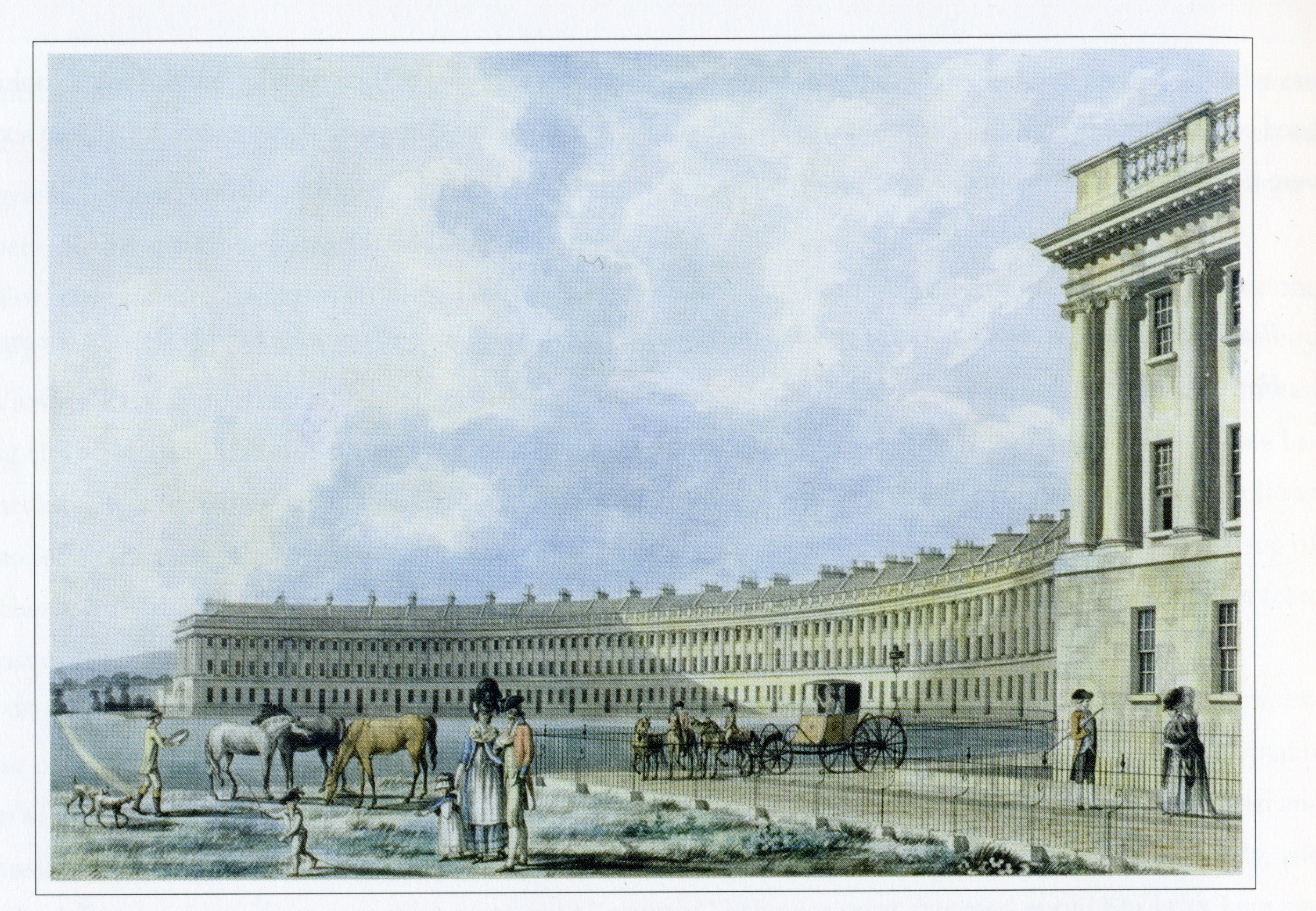
The Royal Crescent in Bath by Thomas Malton 1780

The land on which the Royal Crescent stands was bought from Sir Benet Garrard of the Garrard baronets, who were the landlords, in December 1766. Between 1767 and 1775 John Wood designed the great curved facade with Ionic columns on a rusticated ground floor. Each original purchaser bought a length of the façade, and then employed their own architect to build a house behind the facade to their own specifications; hence what can appear to be two houses is occasionally just one. This system of town planning is betrayed at the rear and can be seen from the road behind the Crescent: while the front is uniform and symmetrical, the rear is a mixture of differing roof heights, juxtapositions and fenestration. This architecture, described as "Queen Anne fronts and Mary-Anne backs", occurs repeatedly in Bath. It was the first crescent of terraced houses to be built and an example of "rus in urbe" (the country in the city) with its views over the parkland opposite.

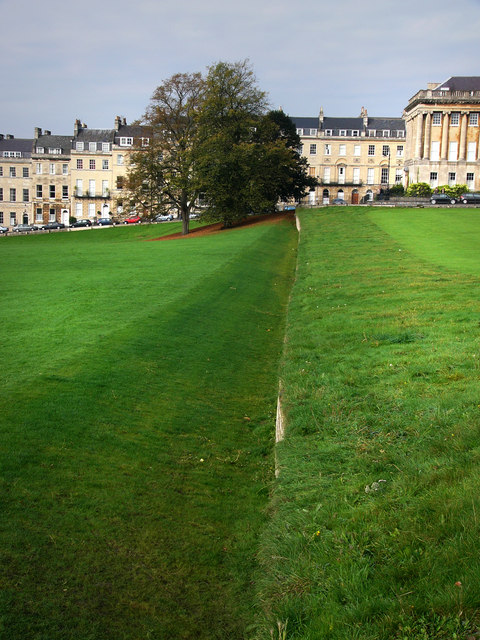
Ha-ha in front of the Royal Crescent

In front of the Royal Crescent is a ha-ha, a ditch on which the inner side is vertical and faced with stone, with the outer face sloped and turfed, making an effective but invisible partition between the lower and upper lawns. The ha-ha is designed so as not to interrupt the view from Royal Victoria Park, and to be invisible until seen from close by. It is not known whether it was contemporary with the building of the Royal Crescent, however it is known that when it was first created it was deeper than it is at present. The railings between the crescent and the lawn were included in the Heritage at Risk Register produced by English Heritage but have been restored and removed from the register.

In 2003, the archaeological television programme Time Team dug the Royal Crescent in search of a Roman cemetery and the Fosse Way. The remains of a Roman wall were found behind the crescent and evidence of possible Iron and Bronze Age settlement on the lawn in front.

== History ==
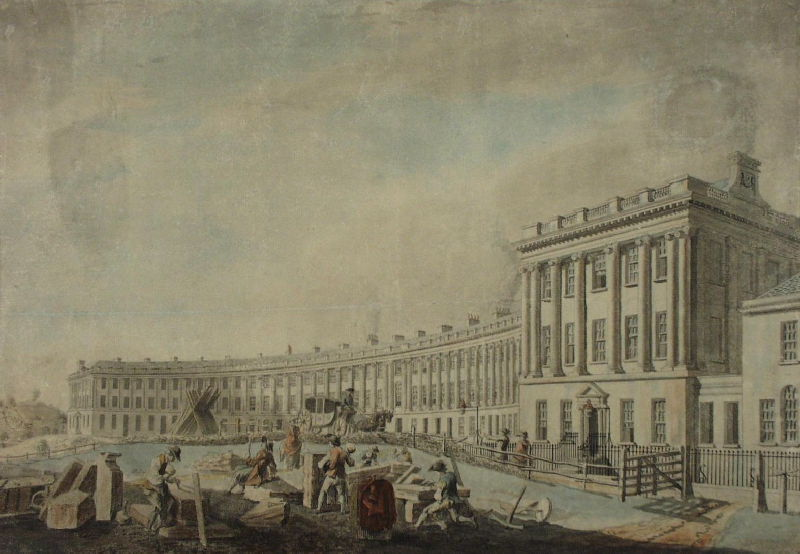
The completion of the building work in 1769

In the late 19th century five cast iron lamp columns with decorative scrollwork were added. In 1921, architect Robert Tor Russell used the Crescent as a source of inspiration to design the central business district of Connaught Place, New Delhi, India.

During the Bath Blitz of World War II, known as the Baedecker Raids or Baedeker Blitz, some bomb damage occurred, the most serious being the gutting of numbers 2 and 17 by incendiaries. After World War II, during a period of redevelopment which is described as the Sack of Bath, the City Council considered plans that would have seen the Crescent transformed into Council offices. These were unsuccessful.

During the 20th century many of the houses which had formerly been the residences of single families with maids or other staff were divided into flats and offices. However, the tradition of distinguished gentlefolk retiring to the crescent continued. The whole crescent was designated as a Grade I listed building in 1950. Number 16 became a guest house in 1950. In 1971 it was combined with number 15 to become the Royal Crescent Hotel occupying the central properties of the Crescent, which were renovated and additional rooms in pavilions and coach houses within the gardens included in the accommodation. It was sold in 1978 to John Tham, the chairman of the London Sloane Club, and restored. It was later purchased by Von Essen Hotels, which became insolvent in 2011. In September 2011 it was expected that London & Regional Properties would purchase the hotel, but negotiations ended in January 2012 without a deal. On 2 April 2012, investment company the Topland Group announced that it had purchased the Royal Crescent Hotel.

In the 1970s the resident of No 22, Miss Amabel Wellesley-Colley, painted her front door yellow instead of the traditional white. Bath City Council issued a notice insisting it should be repainted. A court case ensued which resulted in the Secretary of State for the Environment declaring that the door could remain yellow. Other proposals for alteration and development including floodlighting and a swimming pool have been defeated.

== Notable residents ==
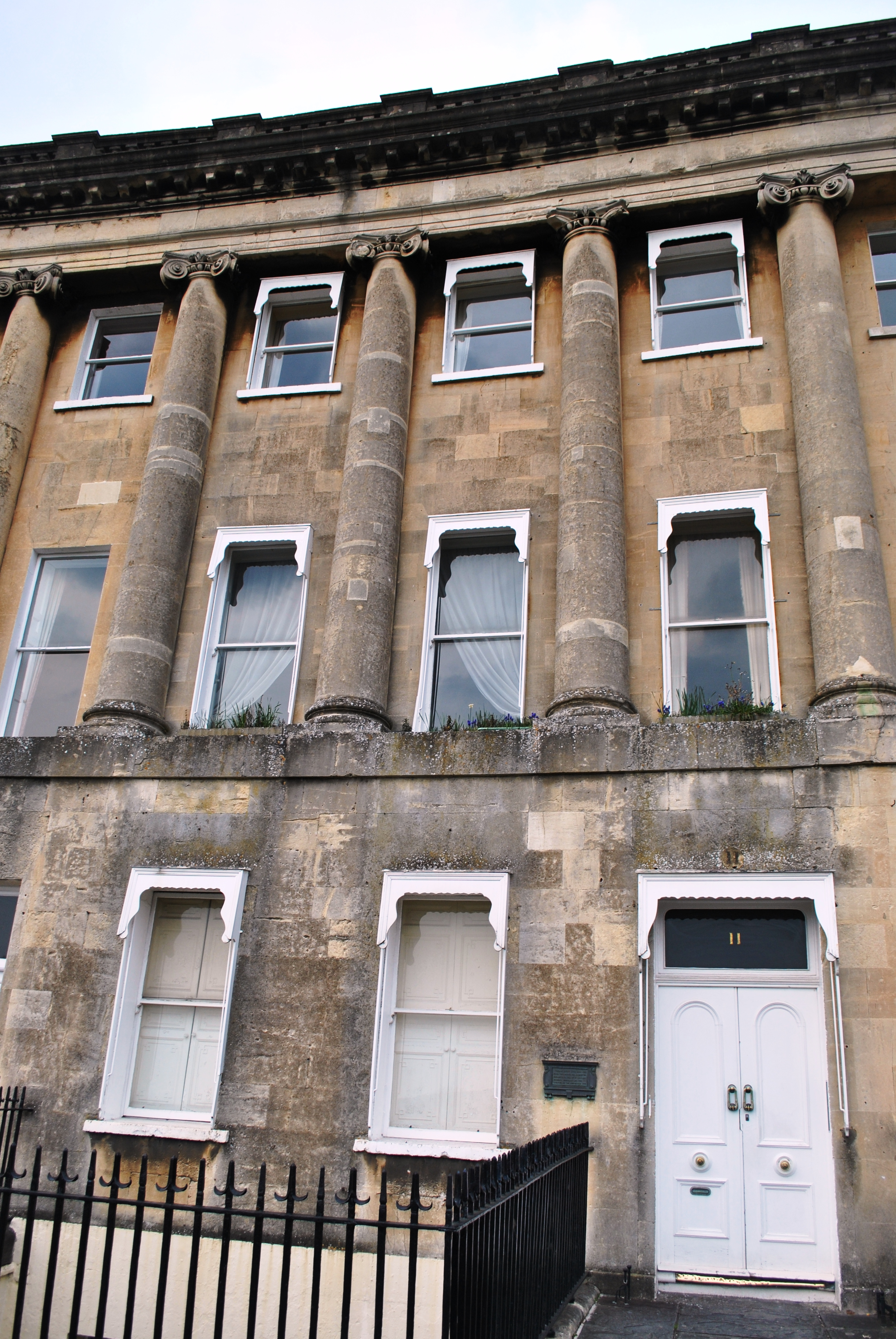
Number 11, Royal Crescent, Bath, was the home to the family of Thomas Linley the elder, a singing-master and conductor of concerts from 1771

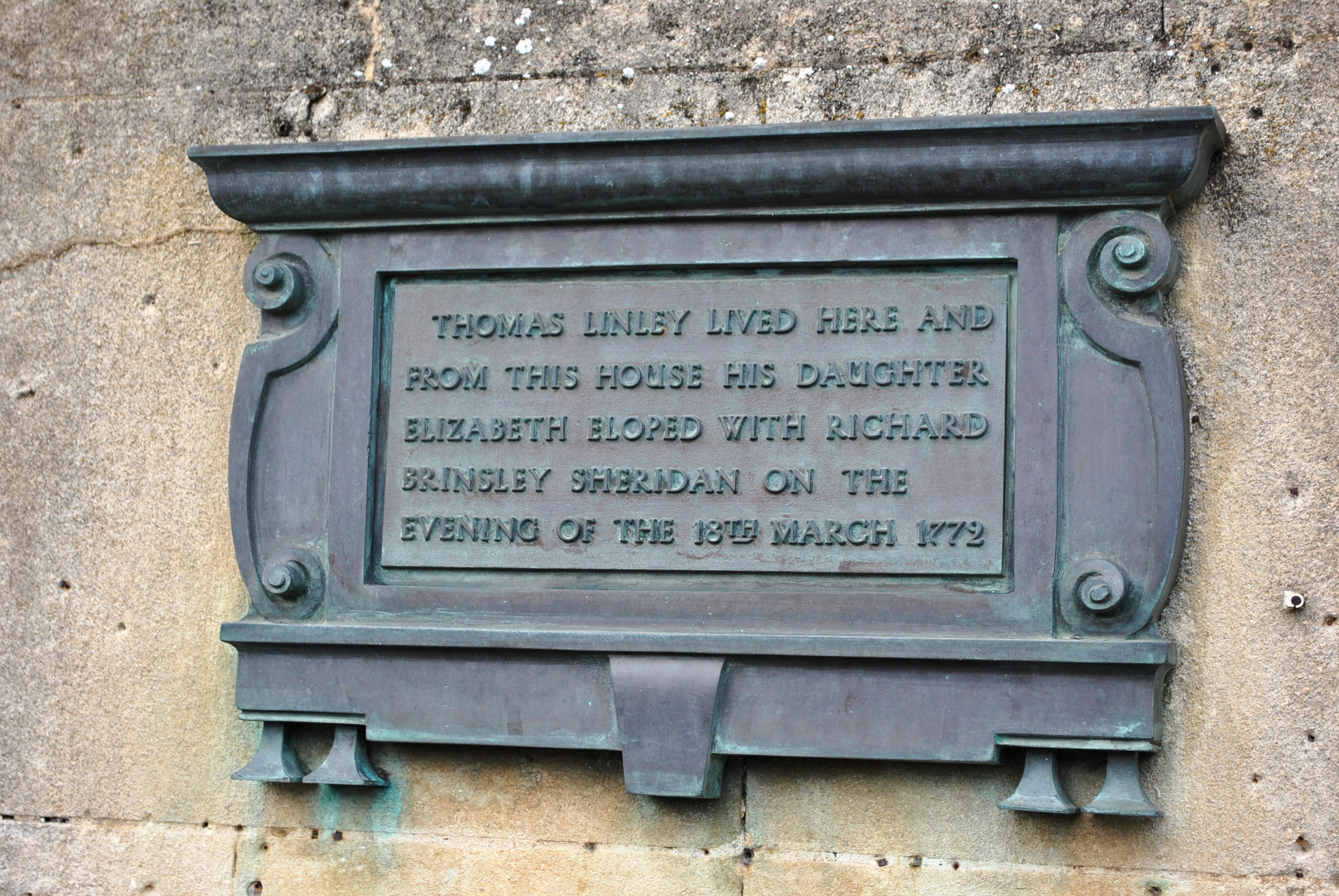
His second daughter Elizabeth Ann Linley, a singer in her own right, eloped with the playwright and poet Richard Brinsley Sheridan

The first resident of Number 1 was Thomas Brock, Town Clerk of Chester, for whom Brock Street was named. His sister Elizabeth had married the architect of the Crescent, John Wood, the Younger. Brock's first tenant at No. 1 was Henry Sandford, a retired Irish MP who rented the house from 1776 until his death in Bath in 1796. Sandford was described as a 'gentleman of the most benevolent disposition'. William Wilberforce stayed at Number 2 in 1798. Christopher Anstey, a well-known writer of the time, was resident in number 4 from 1770 until 1805, although the plaque to him is placed on number 5. Jean Baptiste, Vicomte du Barre took over number 8 in 1778 and hosted parties and gambling. He died in a duel on Claverton Down and is buried in the churchyard at the Church of St Nicholas in Bathampton. From 1768 to 1774 number 9 was home to Philip Thicknesse, a soldier of fortune. Number 11 was home to the family of Thomas Linley, a singing-master and conductor of the concerts from 1771. His eldest daughter Elizabeth Ann Linley, a singer in her own right, eloped with the playwright and poet Richard Brinsley Sheridan. The centre house of the crescent (#16) was used as a residence and to host blue stocking events by Elizabeth Montagu.

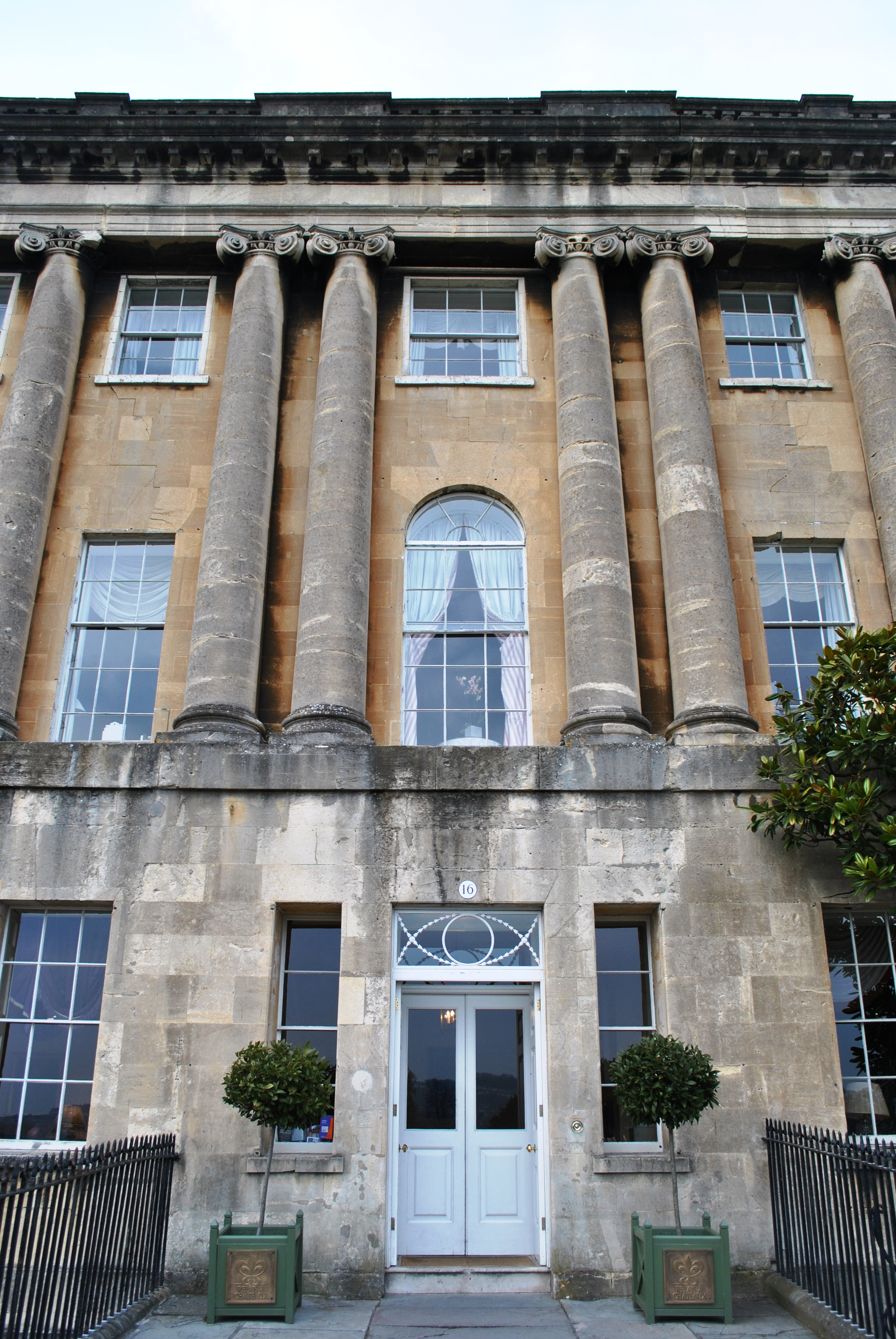
The centre house, 16 Royal Crescent, Bath, was used as a residence and to host Blue Stockings Society events by Elizabeth Montagu

In the nineteenth century the popularity of the Crescent and 'taking the waters' at the Roman Baths diminished somewhat. Amongst the residents of Royal Crescent during this time were the electoral reformer Francis Burdett who lived at number 16 from 1814 to 1822 and his daughter Angela Burdett-Coutts, 1st Baroness Burdett-Coutts. The retired Admiral William Hargood lived at number 9 from 1834 until 1839 and in 1866 the same house was home to Edward Bulwer-Lytton. The jurist and explorer Thomas Falconer briefly lived at number 18 before his death in 1882. A few years later the house next door at number 17 became home to Isaac Pitman who developed the most widely used system of shorthand, now known as Pitman shorthand. English professor George Saintsbury took up residence at number 1A in 1916.

21st-century residents include the English comedian, actor and writer John Cleese, best known for Monty Python's Flying Circus and Fawlty Towers.

== Current use ==
The houses and flats in the Crescent are a mixture of tenures. After World War II when there was a shortage of housing and the city council bought up older properties, including some in Royal Crescent, as public housing to rent out. The Housing Act 1985 changed the succession of Council Houses and facilitated the transfer of council housing to not-for-profit housing associations. Several were subsequently sold into private ownership, however one remains in council ownership.

No. 1 Royal Crescent is a historic house museum, owned and maintained by the Bath Preservation Trust through its membership to illustrate how wealthy owners of the late 18th century might have furnished and occupied such a house. It was purchased in 1967 by Major Bernard Cayzer, a member of the family that made its fortune through the Clan shipping line. He donated it to the Trust with an amount of money for its restoration and furnishing. The restoration was led by Philip Jebb. The Bath Preservation Trust was working during 2012–13 to re-unite Number One with its original servants' wing at Number 1A Royal Crescent, which has been in use as a separate dwelling for many years. No. 1 serves as the Trust's headquarters. Number 15 and 16 are still used as a hotel.

Bath and North East Somerset council made an order banning coaches and buses from the crescent, after many years of complaints by residents that the tours given to tourists were disruptive, particularly because of the amplified commentary given by tour guides on open top buses.

== Architecture ==
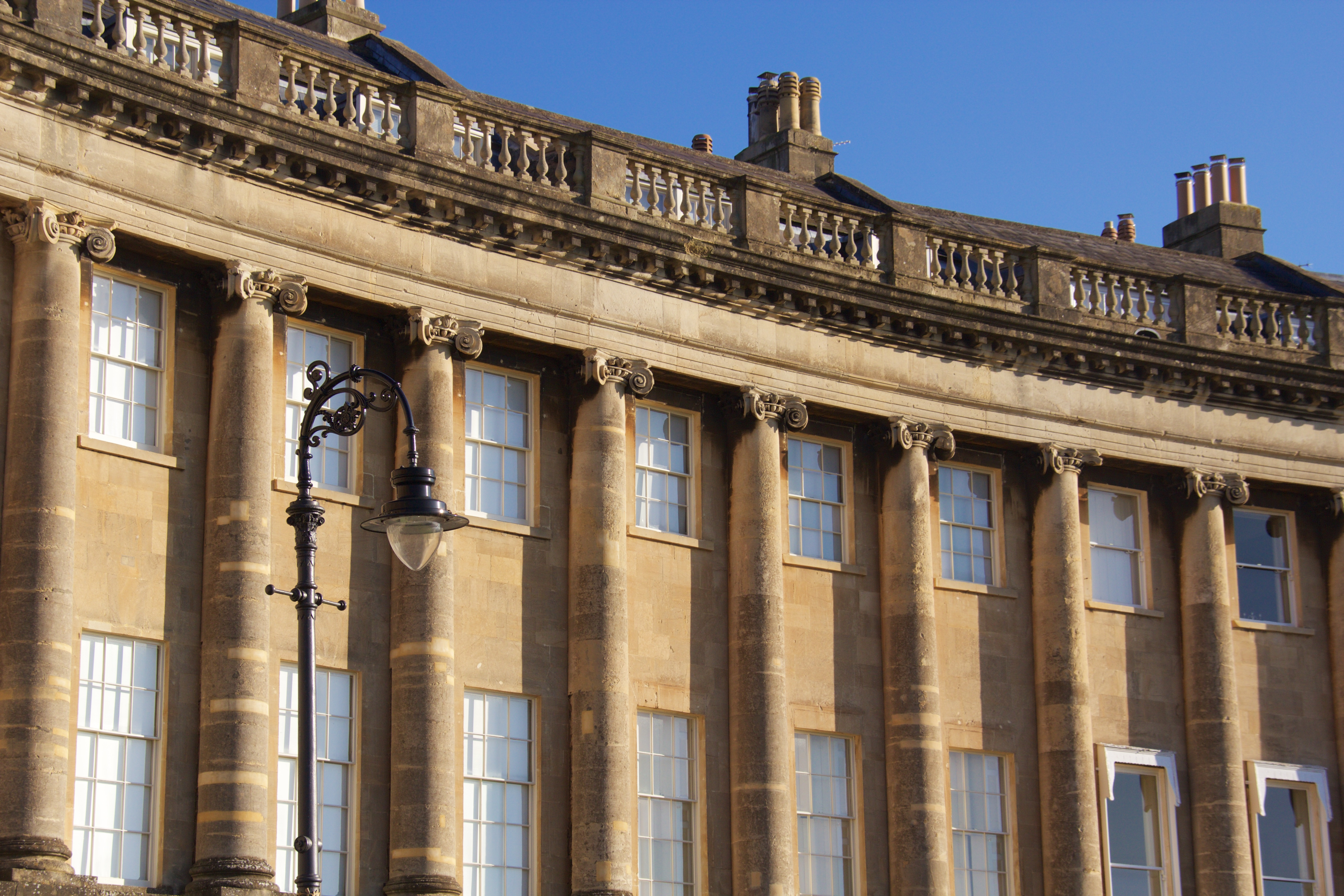
Architectural detail of the Ionic columns, entablature and cast iron lamp

The crescent is 500 feet (150 m) long and each building is almost 50 feet (15 m) high, including small rooms with dormer windows in the attic. The ground floor is plain emphasising the columns and windows of the first floor. The 114 columns are 30 inches (76 cm) in diameter reaching 47 feet (14.3 m), each with an entablature 5 feet (1.5 m) deep in a Palladian style. The central house (now the Royal Crescent Hotel) boasts two sets of coupled columns with a single window between them which is the middle of the crescent.

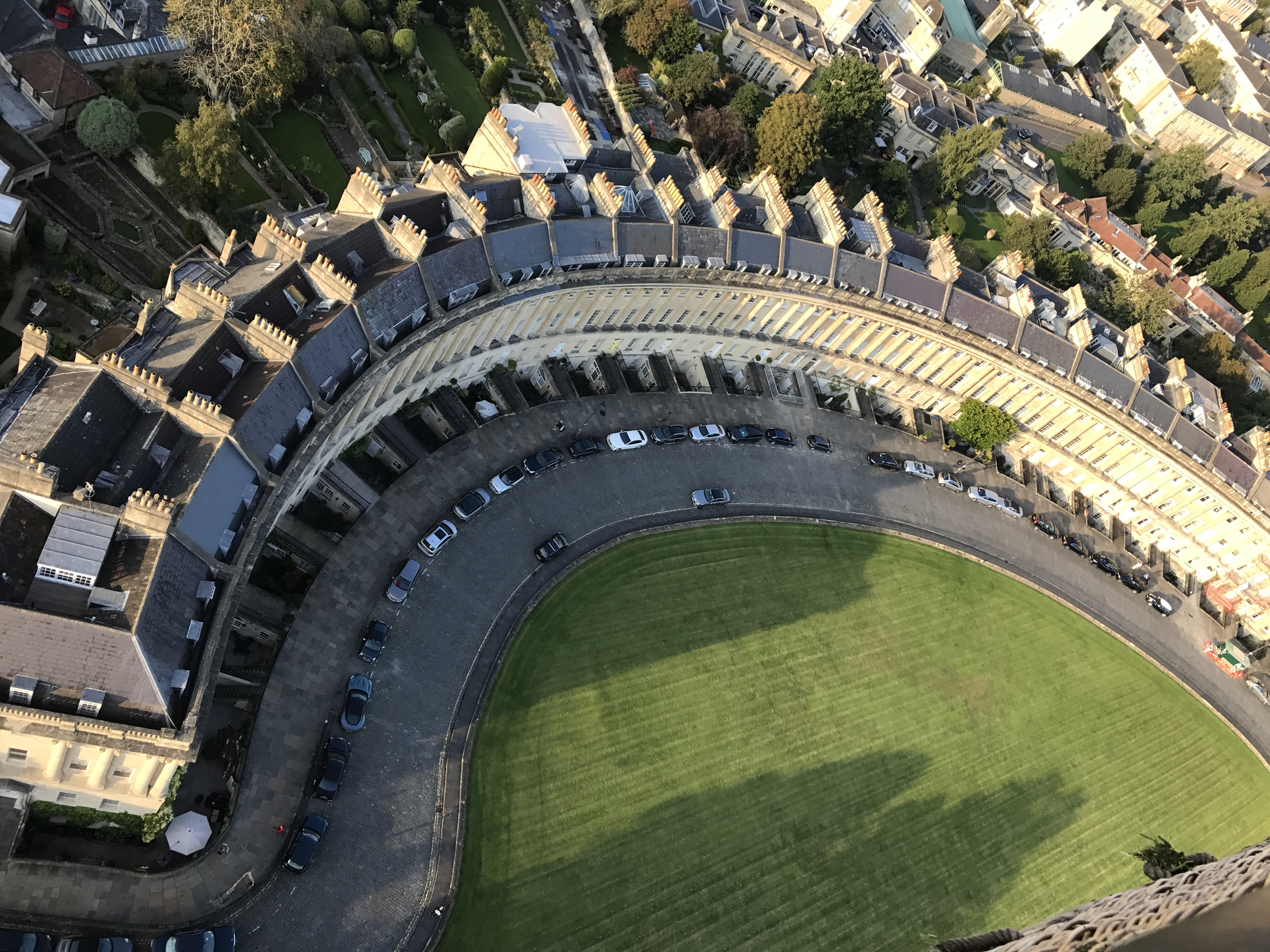
Aerial view of the Royal Crescent

They are built of Bath stone. They have slate roofs but were originally stone tiled. The appearance of each house is very similar with only minor variations between them, for example, some have small balconettes on the first floor. Many of the windows have been restored to their original style with glazing bars rather than the horned plate glass sash windows which had been installed in the 19th or early 20th centuries. Some of the window sills had also been lowered. This has been reversed at Number 1 but policy has since changed with a decision to keep the alterations which were made in the 19th century. In front of the houses are cast iron railings which are mirrored by those on the opposite side of the road at the top of Victoria Park. The road is surfaced with pennant stone laid when the crescent was constructed.

== Film and television ==
In 1965, the black comedy The Wrong Box (1966) used the Crescent extensively as a location, standing in for London.

The 1965 film Catch Us If You Can had a sequence filmed outside the Crescent, and in one of its houses.

In 2007, a TV edition of Jane Austen's Persuasion included many scenes shot at the Crescent, where the Elliot family was supposedly living while in Bath.

The Crescent featured in the 2008 film The Duchess, starring Keira Knightley.

The fictional heroine of 2008 BBC1 archaeology thriller Bonekickers was depicted as living in the Crescent.

In 2014, the hotel in the Crescent was a location for BBC1 series Our Girl.

In 2020, the Crescent was first used in the Netflix series Bridgerton and continued to be used in later seasons.

The ITV television series McDonald & Dodds is set in Bath and makes frequent use of the Crescent as interstitial scenery as well as a shooting location.

In the Salvage Hunters spinoff Salvage Hunters: Georgian House Restoration, Drew Pritchard purchases one of the houses and struggles with the high costs of its restoration.

== Panorama ==
A panoramic view of the Royal Crescent. The ha-ha can be seen separating the upper and lower lawns.

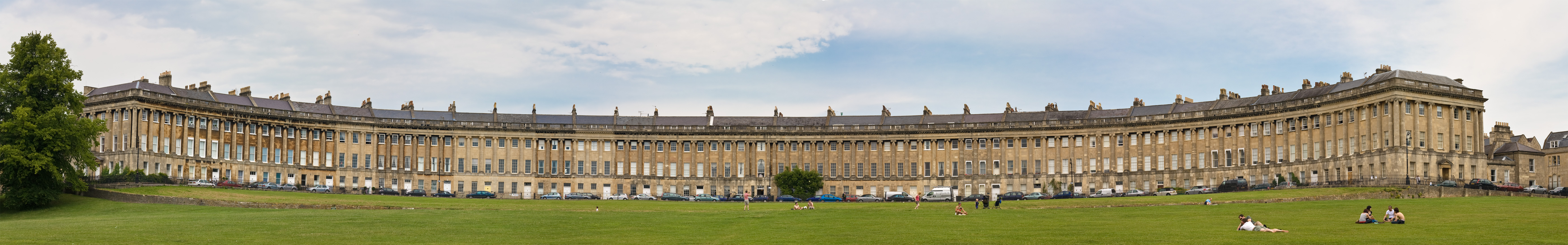
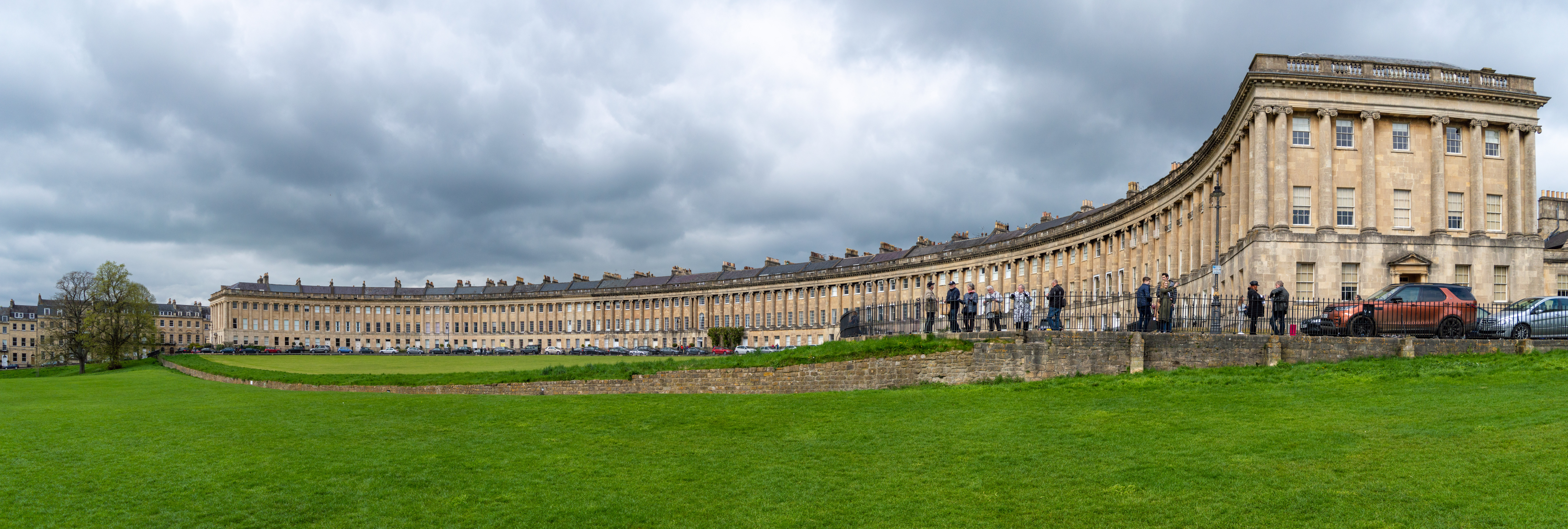

== See also ==
- List of Grade I listed buildings in Bath and North East Somerset
- Buxton Crescent

== Bibliography ==
- Crathorne, James (1998). The Royal Crescent Book of Bath. Collins & Brown. ISBN 978-1-85585-498-7.
- Forsyth, Michael (2003). Bath Buildings of England Pevsner architectural guides. Yale University Press. pp. 44–45. ISBN 978-0-300-10177-5.
- Gadd, David (1987). Georgian Summer: Rise and Development of Bath (2 ed.). Countryside Books. ISBN 978-0-905392-60-8.
- Haddon, John (1982). Portrait of Bath. Robert Hale. ISBN 978-0-7091-9883-3.
- Lowndes, William (1981). The Royal Crescent in Bath. Redcliffe Press. ISBN 978-0-905459-34-9.
- Moon, Michael; Davidson, Cathy N. (1995). Subjects and Citizens: Nation, Race, and Gender from Oroonoko to Anita Hill. Duke University Press. ISBN 0-8223-1539-4.
