= Maria Start =

British automata maker and restorer

Maria Start (born 14 December 1966) is a British automata maker and restorer. She trained in Fashion design in Maidenhead, Berkshire, and now specialises in the conservation and restoration of antique automata, with a focus on 19th Century automata.

Maria Start is co-founder of "The House of Automata". Together with her husband, Michael Start, they restore and deal in antique automata. Founded in London, it is now based in the North of Scotland, where “The House of Automata” operates from a workshop studio.

== Media and television ==
Maria Start features as an expert on Salvage Hunters- The Restorers, produced by Quest and Discovery Channel. Together with her husband Michael, they appear in Series 3, 4, 5 and 6, as experts in Automata restoration & similar mechanical toys and games.
