= Michael Start =

Michael Start (born 27 October 1960) is a British automata maker and restorer. He trained in Technical Horology at Hackney College in London, and now specialises in the conservation and restoration of antique automata, with a focus on 19th Century automata.

Michael Start is co-founder of "The House of Automata". Together with his wife, Maria Start, they restore and deal in antique automata. Founded in London, it is now based in the North of Scotland, where “The House of Automata” operates from a workshop studio.

== Media and television ==
Michael Start has worked as a consultant to the media, advising on automata and horology for screen. In 2011, Start designed the mechanism for the automaton that was featured in the Martin Scorsese screen adaptation of ‘’Hugo’’.

Michael Start features as an expert on Salvage Hunters- The Restorers, produced by Quest and Discovery Channel. Together with his wife Maria, they appear in Series 3, 4 and 5, as experts in Automata restoration.
