= George Saintsbury =

British critic and literary historian (1845–1933)

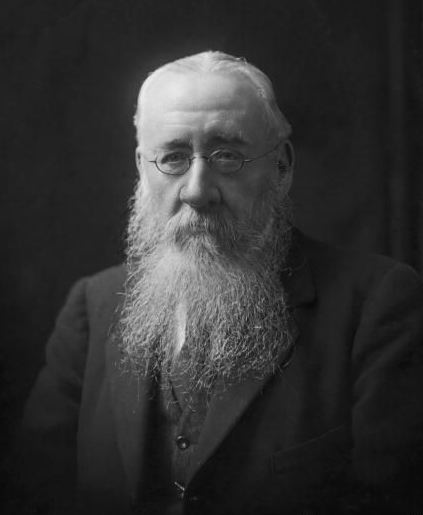
- Photograph by James Lafayette (c. 1910)
- Born: 23 October 1845; Southampton, England
- Died: 28 January 1933 (aged 87); Bath, Somerset, England
- Education: King's College School; Merton College, Oxford
- Occupations: Critic, literary historian, editor
- Writing career
- Genre: Literary criticism

Signature
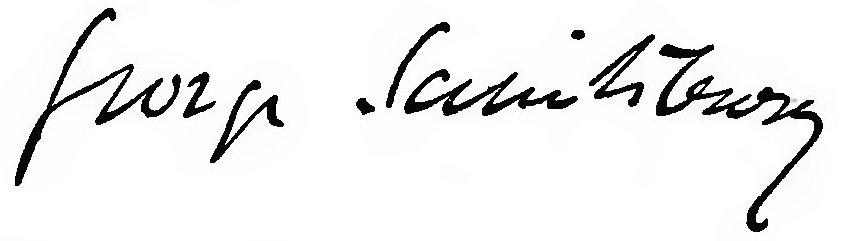

George Edward Bateman Saintsbury, FBA (23 October 1845 – 28 January 1933) was an English critic, literary historian, editor, teacher, and wine connoisseur. He gained a reputation as a highly influential literary critic of the late-19th and early-20th centuries.

== Biography ==
Born in Lottery Hall, Southampton, he was educated at King's College School, London, and at Merton College, Oxford, where he achieved a first class BA degree in Classical Mods, (1865), and a second class in literae humaniores (1867).

He left Oxford in 1868 having failed to obtain a fellowship, and briefly became a master at the Manchester Grammar School, before spending six years in Guernsey as senior classical master of Elizabeth College, where he began his literary career by submitting his first reviews to The Academy. From 1874 until he returned to London in 1876, he was headmaster of the Elgin Educational Institute, with a brief period in 1877 on The Manchester Guardian.

From the early 1880s, until 1894 he worked as a writer and subeditor for the Saturday Review. Some of the critical essays contributed to the literary journals were afterwards collected in his Essays in English Literature, Essays on French Novelists (1891), Miscellaneous Essays (1892), and Corrected Impressions (1895).

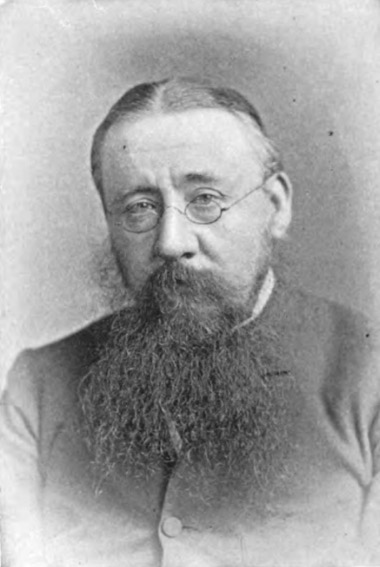
Saintsbury in March 1895 edition of The Bookman (New York City)

In 1895, Saintsbury became professor of rhetoric and English literature at the University of Edinburgh, a position he held until 1915. During his time in Edinburgh, he was a member of the Scottish Arts Club.

In his retirement, he continued to write, while living at 1A Royal Crescent, Bath, Somerset. He died there in 1933, at the age of 87.

== Literary criticism ==
His first book, A Primer of French Literature (1880), and his Short History of French Literature (1882), were followed by a series of editions of French classics and of books and articles on the history of French literature, which made him the most prominent English authority on the subject. His studies in English literature were no less comprehensive, and included the valuable revision of Sir Walter Scott's edition of John Dryden's Works (Edinburgh, 18 vols., 1882–1893), Dryden (1881) in the "English Men of Letters" series, History of Elizabethan Literature (1887), History of Nineteenth Century Literature (1896), A Short History of English Literature (1898, 3rd ed. 1903 – and a book that continued to be reprinted at least into the 1960s), a three-volume edition of the Minor Poets of the Caroline Period (1905, 1906, 1921), a collection of rare poems of great value, and editions of English classics. He coined the term "Janeite" for a fan of Jane Austen in his introduction to an 1894 edition of Pride and Prejudice.

He wrote numerous articles on literary subjects (including Pierre Corneille, Daniel Defoe, Clément Marot, Michel de Montaigne, Jean Racine, Jean-Jacques Rousseau and Voltaire) for the ninth edition (1875–89) of the Encyclopædia Britannica.

In 1901 Saintsbury edited and introduced an English edition of Honoré de Balzac's novel series La Comédie humaine, translated by Ellen Marriage and published in 1895–98 by J. M. Dent.

For the publisher William Blackwood and Sons, he edited the series of Periods of European Literature, contributing volumes on The Flourishing of Romance and the Rise of Allegory (1897) and The Earlier Renaissance (1901).

Saintsbury subsequently produced some of his most important works: A History of Criticism (3 vols., 1900–1904), with the companion volume Loci Critici: Passages Illustrative of Critical Theory and Practice (Boston, Mass., and London, 1903), and A History of English Prosody from the 12th Century to the Present Day (i., 1906; ii., 1908; iii., 1910); also The Later Nineteenth Century (1909). These were followed by a History of English Prose Rhythm (1912), The English Novel (1913), A First Book of English Literature (1914), The Peace of the Augustans (1916), A History of the French Novel (2 volumes, 1917–9) and Notes on a Cellarbook (1920).

In 1925 he arranged for the publication of a lost recipe book by Anne Blencoe, which had been rediscovered in Weston Hall 200 years after her death. Saintsbury wrote a short introduction to the reissued book.

== Wine ==
Although Saintsbury was best known during his lifetime as a scholar, he is also remembered today for his Notes on a Cellar-Book (1920), one of the great testimonials to drink and drinking in wine literature. When he was close to death, André Simon arranged a dinner in his honour. Although Saintsbury did not attend, this was the start of the Saintsbury Club, men of letters and members of the wine trade who continue to have dinners to this day.

== Political views ==
Saintsbury espoused deeply conservative views in political and social matters. George Orwell calls him a 'confessed reactionary' in his 1937 book The Road to Wigan Pier and cites various extracts from the Scrapbooks which display Saintsbury's class-based disdain for the welfare state and paupers.

== Legacy ==
T. S. Eliot dedicated the publication of his book Homage to John Dryden: Three Essays on the Poetry of the 17th Century (1924) to Saintsbury.

1A Royal Crescent, where Saintsbury lived from 1915 until his death in 1933, was the subject of a restoration and renovation programme by the Bath Preservation Trust during 2012 to reincorporate it into 1 Royal Crescent, of which it was the original servants' quarters. It opened to visitors for the first time in 2013. An exhibition celebrating Saintsbury's life was mounted in the house in 2014.

A biography of Saintsbury, written by Dorothy Richardson Jones and giving extensive commentary on his works, was published in 1992.

== Bibliography ==
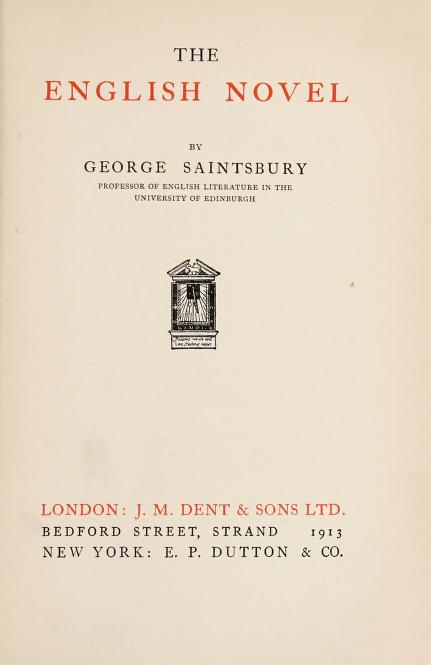
Original title page for Saintsbury's The English Novel (1913)

- Primer of French Literature (1880)
- French Lyrics (1st ed., 1882)
- A Short History of French Literature (1882); 5th Ed., "With the Section on the 19th Cent. Greatly Enlarged" (1897)
- Specimens of English Prose Style from Malory to Macaulay (1885) (alternative copy)
- A History of Elizabethan Literature (1887) (alternative: Copy I and Copy II; Project Gutenberg)
- As Translator and Editor: Essays on English Literature (1889) by Edmond Scherer. Chronicle of the Reign of Charles IX (1890) by Prosper Mérimée. Les Chouans (1891) by Balzac. Corinne (1894, 2 vols.) by Madame de Stael. Moral Tales (1895) by Marmontel.
- As Series Editor for The Pocket Library of English Literature: Tales of Mystery: Mrs. Radcliffe, Lewis, Maturin (1891). Political Verse (1891). Selections from Defoe's Minor Novels (1892). Political Pamphlets (1892). Seventeenth Century Lyrics (1893). Elizabethan and Jacobean Pamphlets (1892).
- Miscellaneous Essays (1895)
- As Series Editor: The 12 volumes of Periods of European Literature, Blackwood & Sons (1890s-1900s)
  - As author: The Flourishing of Romance and the Rise of Allegory (Vol. 2 of Periods of European Literature series, 1897)
  - As author: The Earlier Renaissance (Vol. 5 of Periods of European Literature series, 1901)
  - As author: The Later Nineteenth Century (Vol. 12 of Periods of European Literature series, 1907)
- A Short History of English Literature (1898) (alternative copy)
- A History of Criticism and Literary Taste in Europe from the Earliest Texts to the Present Day (1900–04). Vol. I: Classical and Mediæval Criticism. Vol. II: From the Renaissance to the Decline of Eighteenth Century Orthodoxy. Vol. III: Modern Criticism.
- Loci Critici: Passages Illustrative of Critical Theory and Practice from Aristotle Downwards (1903)
- A History of English Prosody from the Twelfth Century to the Present Day (1906–10). Vol. I: From the Origins to Spenser. Vol. II: From Shakespeare to Crabbe. Vol. III: From Blake to Mr. Swinburne. (alternatives: Vol. I; Vol. II, Vol. III)
- Historical Manual of English Prosody (1910) (alternatives: Copy I; Copy II; Copy III; Project Gutenberg)
- History of English Prose Rhythm (1912), containing an essay entitled, 'Authorised Version and the Triumph of the Ornate Style.'
- The English Novel (1913) (alternative copy)
- A First Book of English Literature (1914)
- The Peace of The Augustans; A Survey of Eighteenth Century Literature as a Place of Rest and Refreshment (1916)
- A History of the French Novel to the Close of the Nineteenth Century (1917–19). Vol. I: From the Beginning to 1800. Vol. II: From 1800 to 1900.
- Notes on a Cellar-Book (1920)
- A Scrap Book (1922), A Second Scrap Book (1923), A Last Scrap Book (1924)
- Minor Poets of the Caroline Period (1921). Vol. I; Vol. II; Vol. III; Vol. III
- Collected Essays and Papers, 1875-1920 (1924). Volume 1: Essays in English Literature. Volume 2: Essays in English Literature. Volume 3: Miscellaneous Essays. Volume 4: Essays in French Literature.
- A Consideration of Thackeray (1931)
- Prefaces and Essays (1933)
- George Saintsbury - The Memorial Volume: A New Collection of his Essays and Papers (1945)
- A Last Vintage: Essays and Papers, ed. John W. Oliver, et al. (1950)
- "English Versification". Introduction to The Rhymers' Lexicon, by Andrew Loring. (2nd ed., revised, 1920).
- "Shakespeare and the grand style". Essays and studies: by members of the English Association. 1: 113–135. ISSN 1359-1746. Wikidata Q107934348.
