= Royal Victoria Park, Bath =

Park in Bath, Somerset, England

Royal Victoria Park
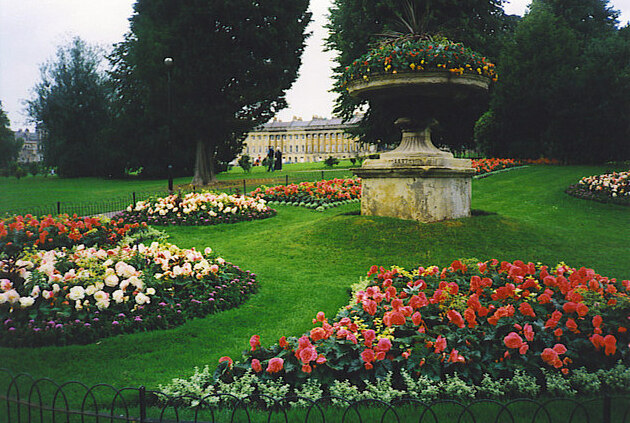
- The park overlooked by the Royal Crescent

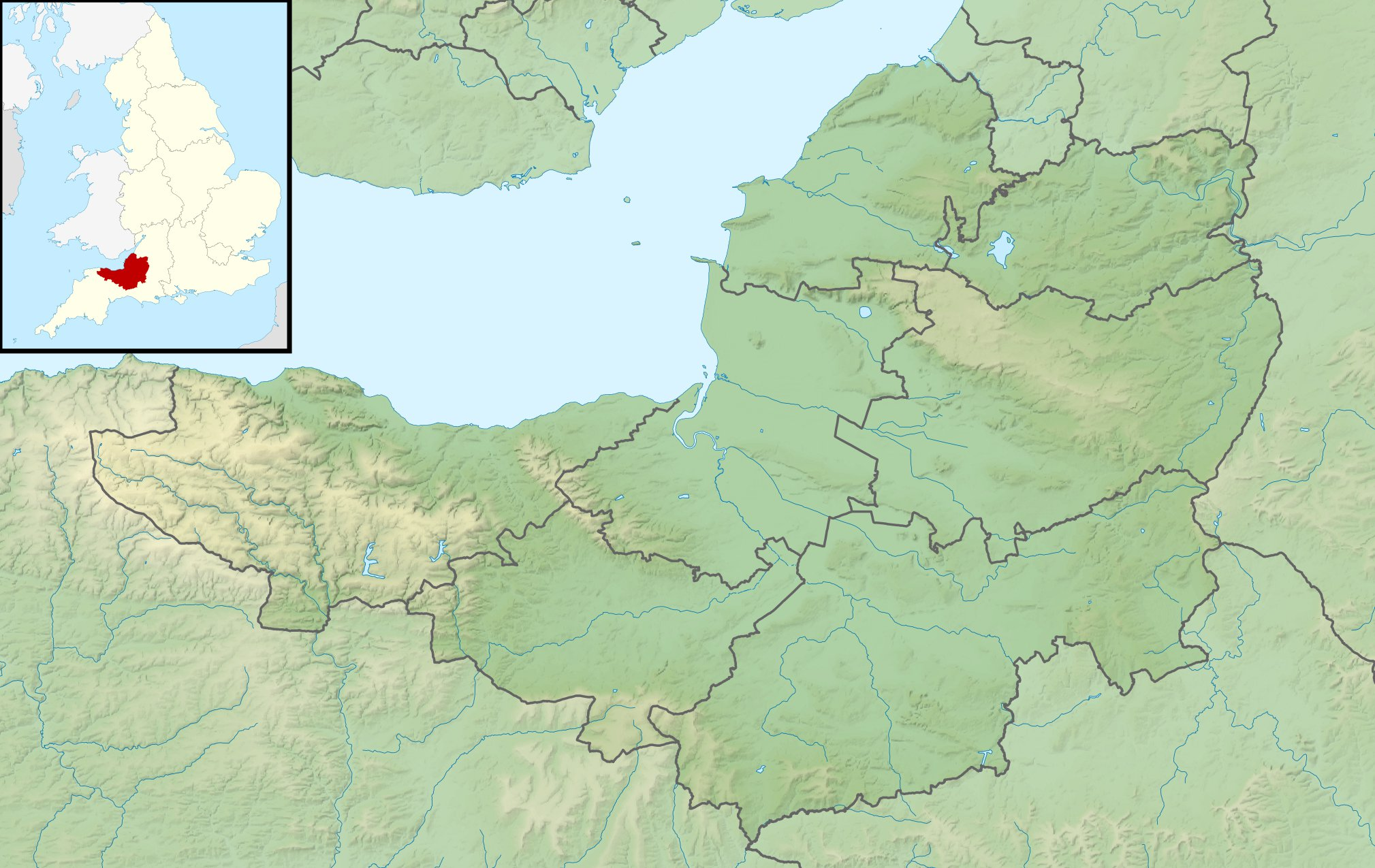
- Location within Somerset
- Location: Bath England
- Coordinates: 51°23′09″N 2°22′13″W
- Area: 57 acres (23 ha)
- Created: 1830
- Operator: Bath and North East Somerset Council
- Status: Open all year
- Designation: Grade I

Royal Victoria Park is a public park in Bath, England. It was opened in 1830 by the 11-year-old Princess Victoria, seven years before her ascension to the throne, and was the first park to carry her name. It was privately run as part of the Victorian public park movement until 1921, when it was taken over by the Bath Corporation.

The park is overlooked by the Royal Crescent and consists of 57 acres (23 ha) with attractions that include a skateboard ramp, tennis, bowling and putting greens and 12 and 18 hole golf course, a large children's play area and a botanical garden covering 9 acres (3.6 ha). Seasonal attractions include carnival fairs, open-air concerts and hosted events.

It has received a Green Flag award (the national standard for parks and green spaces in England and Wales) and is Grade I registered by Historic England on the National Register of Historic Parks and Gardens.

== Victoria Column and Victoria Gate ==
Inside the east entrance to the park on Marlborough Lane is the Grade II* listed Victoria Column, erected in 1837 to mark the coming-of-age (at age 18) of Princess Victoria. G. P. Manners, the Bath city architect, designed a tapering triangular stone obelisk, about 33 feet (10 m) tall. The triangular plinth has a low-profile relief of the Princess, and contemporary and later inscriptions on its other faces; radiating from it are three plinths bearing lions couchant. The whole is surrounded by a low balustraded wall. The unveiling of the monument took place on Victoria's coronation day, 28 June 1838.

At one time, guns captured in the Crimean War were placed nearby but they were later removed.

The obelisk is approached from Royal Avenue and Marlborough Lane through a former carriage gateway constructed in 1830. Originally called Spry's Gate, it became Victoria Gate on the raising of the obelisk. When the structure was designated as Grade II* listed in 1972 it was stated that the cast iron gates had been removed in World War II, but gates with gilded decoration have since been reinstated. In the centre is a wrought iron column carrying a lantern, and on each side are pedestrian entrances in limestone ashlar. These each have a platform roof on twelve plain square columns, and above is a feature with a semicircular arch under a plain pediment. The designer, Edward Davis, had been a pupil of John Soane in the 1820s, and the listing description notes similarity to the style of St John's Church, Bethnal Green, London, where Davis had assisted Soane.

== The Botanical Gardens ==
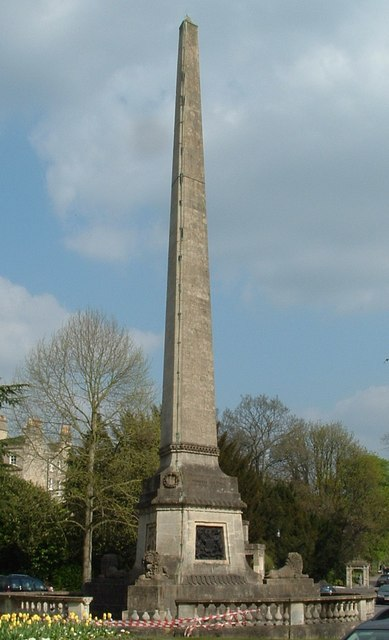
Obelisk commemorating Princess Victoria's coming-of-age, 1837

The Botanical Gardens were formed in the north-west area of the park in 1887 and contain one of the finest collections of plants on limestone in the West Country. The replica of a Roman Temple in the gardens was used at the British Empire Exhibition at Wembley in 1924.

== Seasonal events ==
Royal Victoria Park is known for hosting events, such as Vintage FunFair, a carnival with hot-air balloons and rides. Popular annual festivals include The Bank Festival and The Children's Festival for May Bank holiday weekend.

Other events include an ice-skating rink in winter, as well as Movie by Moonlight, Glow in the Dark Mini Golf, Bath Thai Festival, Bath Easter Funfair, Pub in the Park and Bath Race for Life.

== Great Dell ==
To the north of the Botanical Gardens is the Great Dell, a sunken wooded area alongside Weston Road. It is a former stone quarry planted out in the 1840s with a collection of unusual trees, including some large North American conifers.

== 2007 restoration ==
In 2007 a programme of reconstruction and restoration was undertaken by Bath and North East Somerset Council and supported by the Heritage Lottery Fund. This included the renovation of two Medici lion statues on plinths each side of the Queen's Gate entrance to the park, replacing the original iron armatures inside the limbs, returning them to their bronze colour, and giving each a gilt ball under its front paw. Further work will add two 8 feet (2.4 m) cast iron replicas of the original lanterns and the replacement of the decorative iron gates to the three main entrances to the park. The original gates were removed, along with all the railings around the park, as part of a Second World War national scrap metal campaign.

Further works involved the reinstatement of over a mile of perimeter railings, the restoration of the bandstand, the reforming of three sets of park gates, work to the Royal Crescent Ha-ha, and the extension of the Temple of Minerva to form a small interpretation centre. These works coincided with significant works to the planting throughout the park.

== Gallery ==
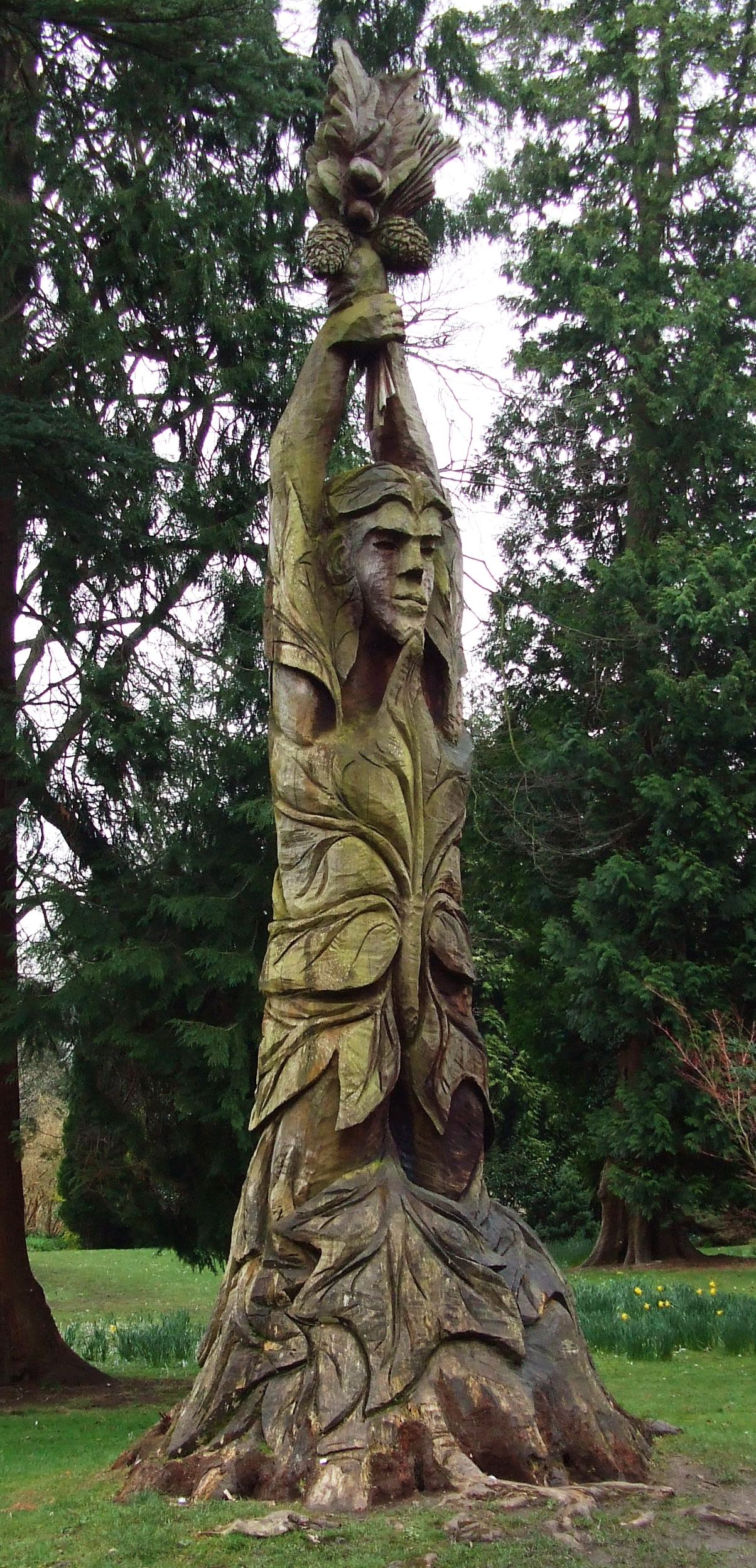
Tree carving in the Botanical gardens

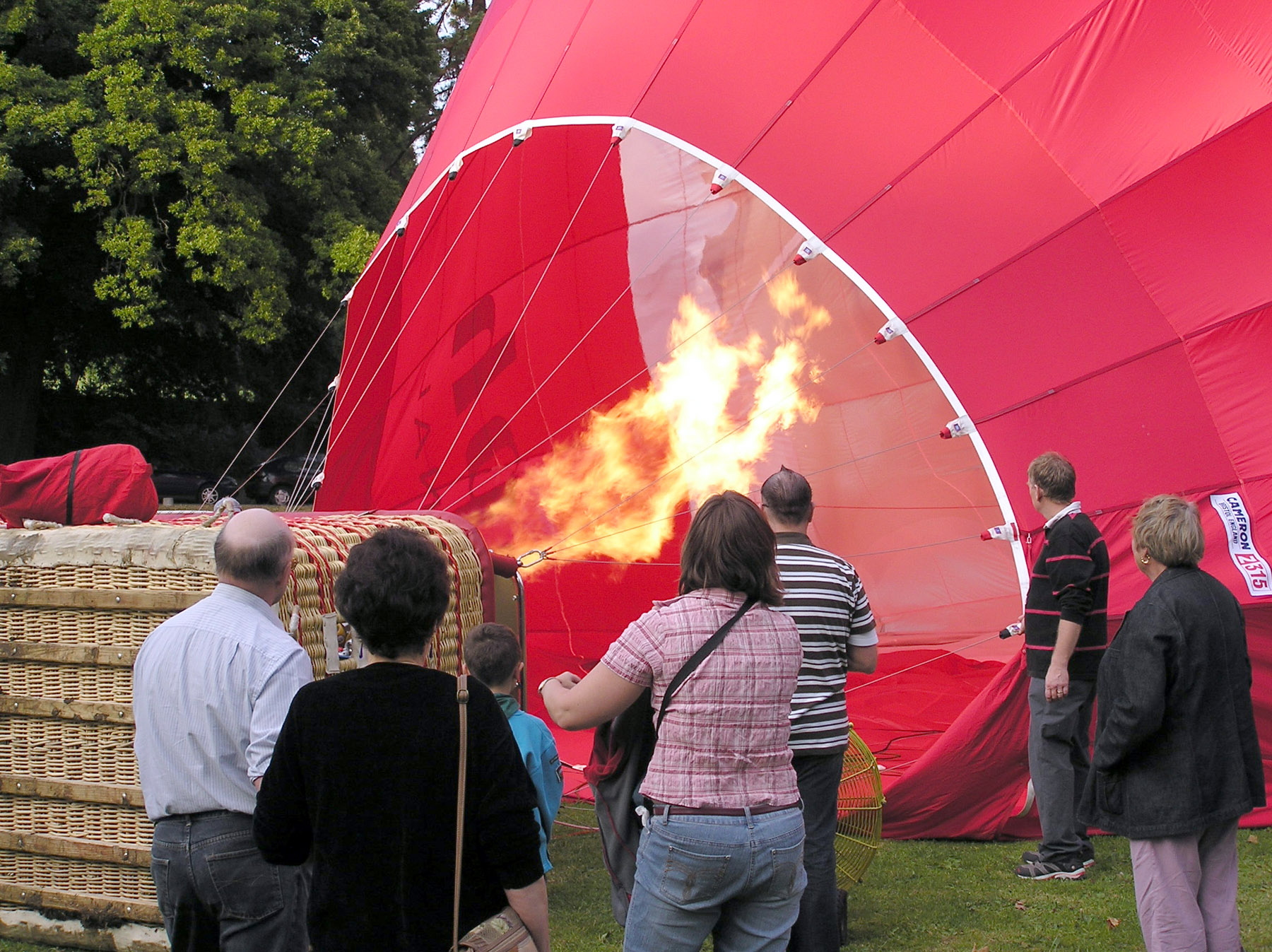
Air-balloon event, a seasonal tradition in Bath

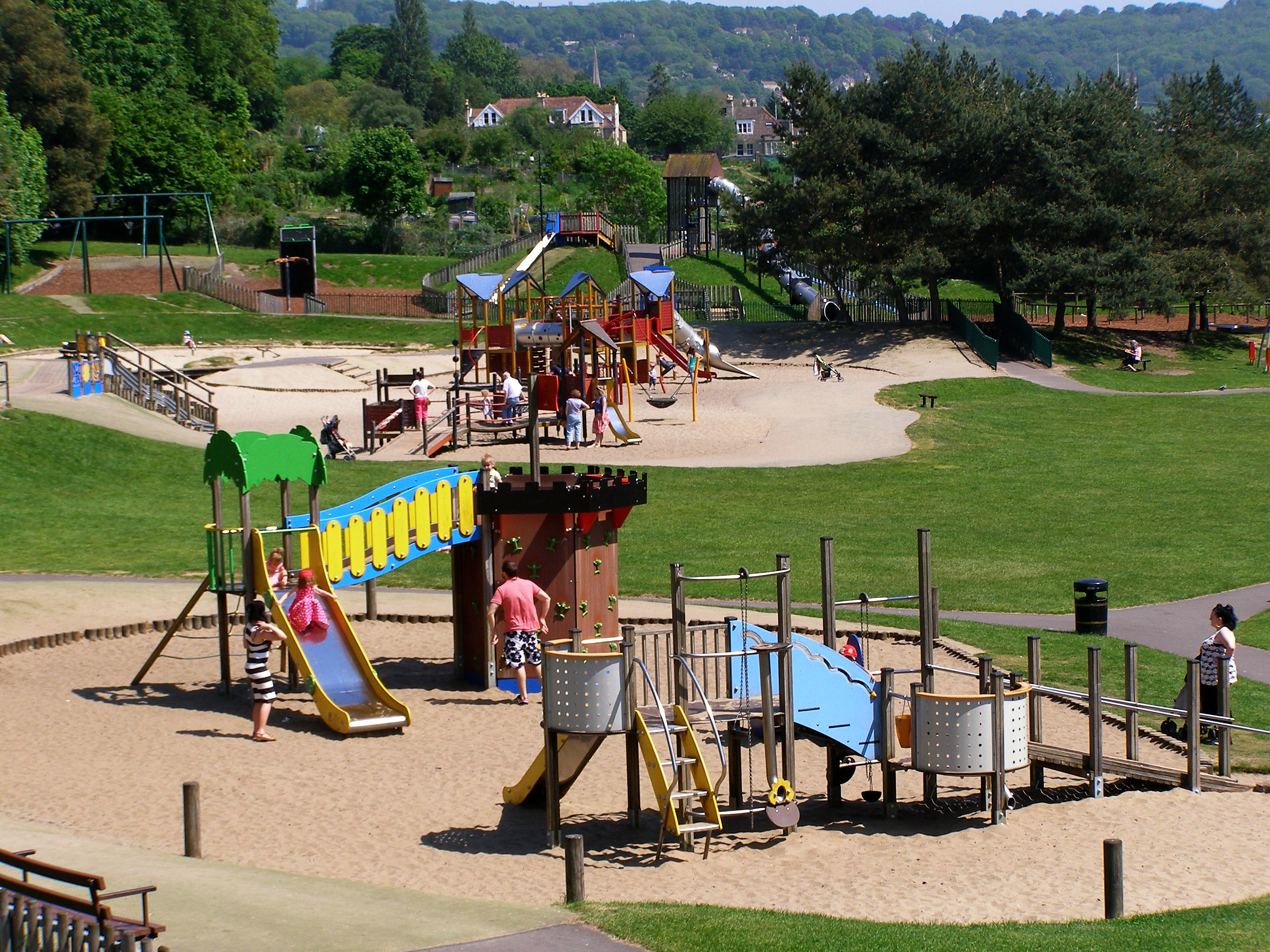
Children's play area

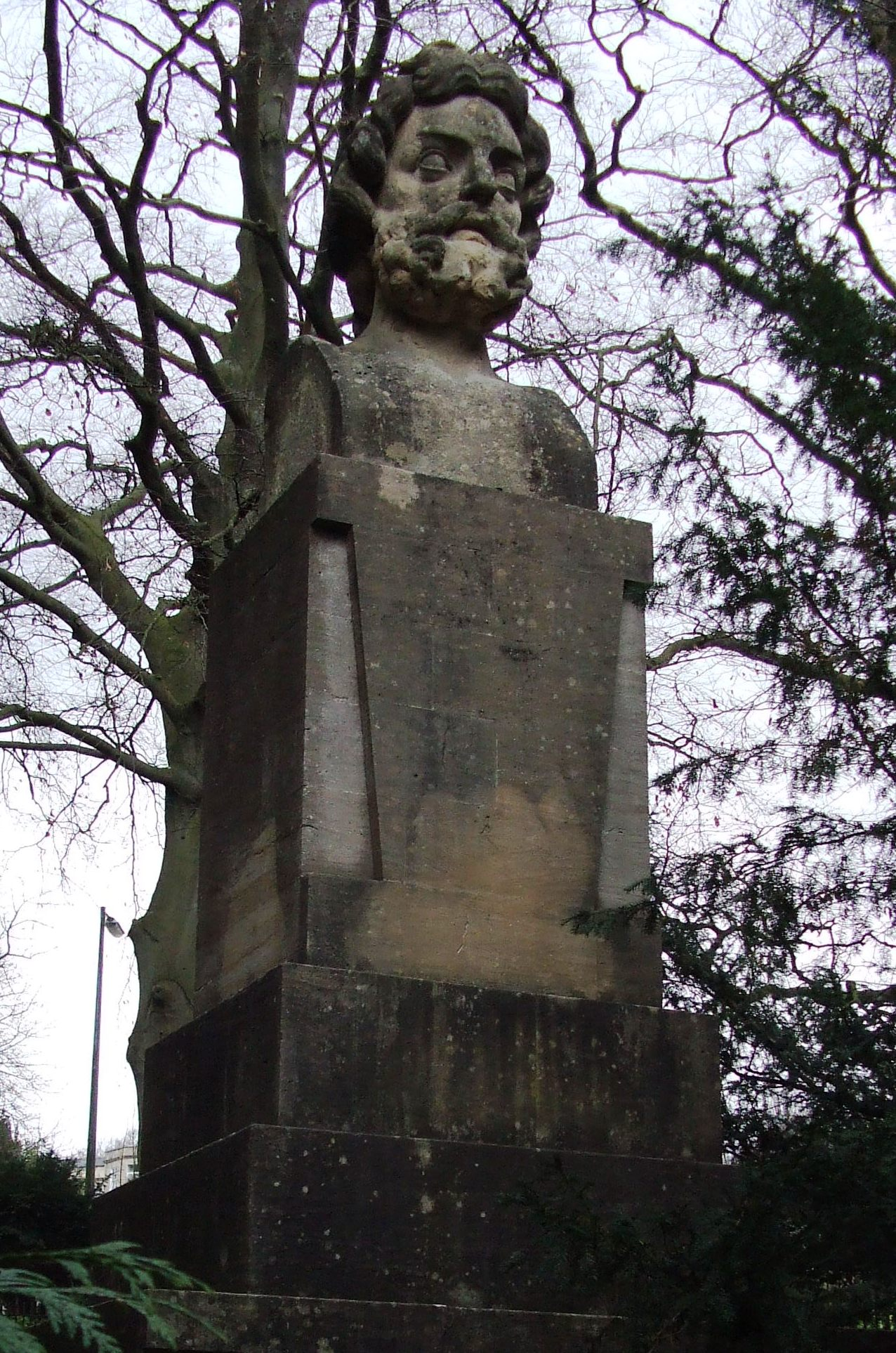
Statue in the Great Dell

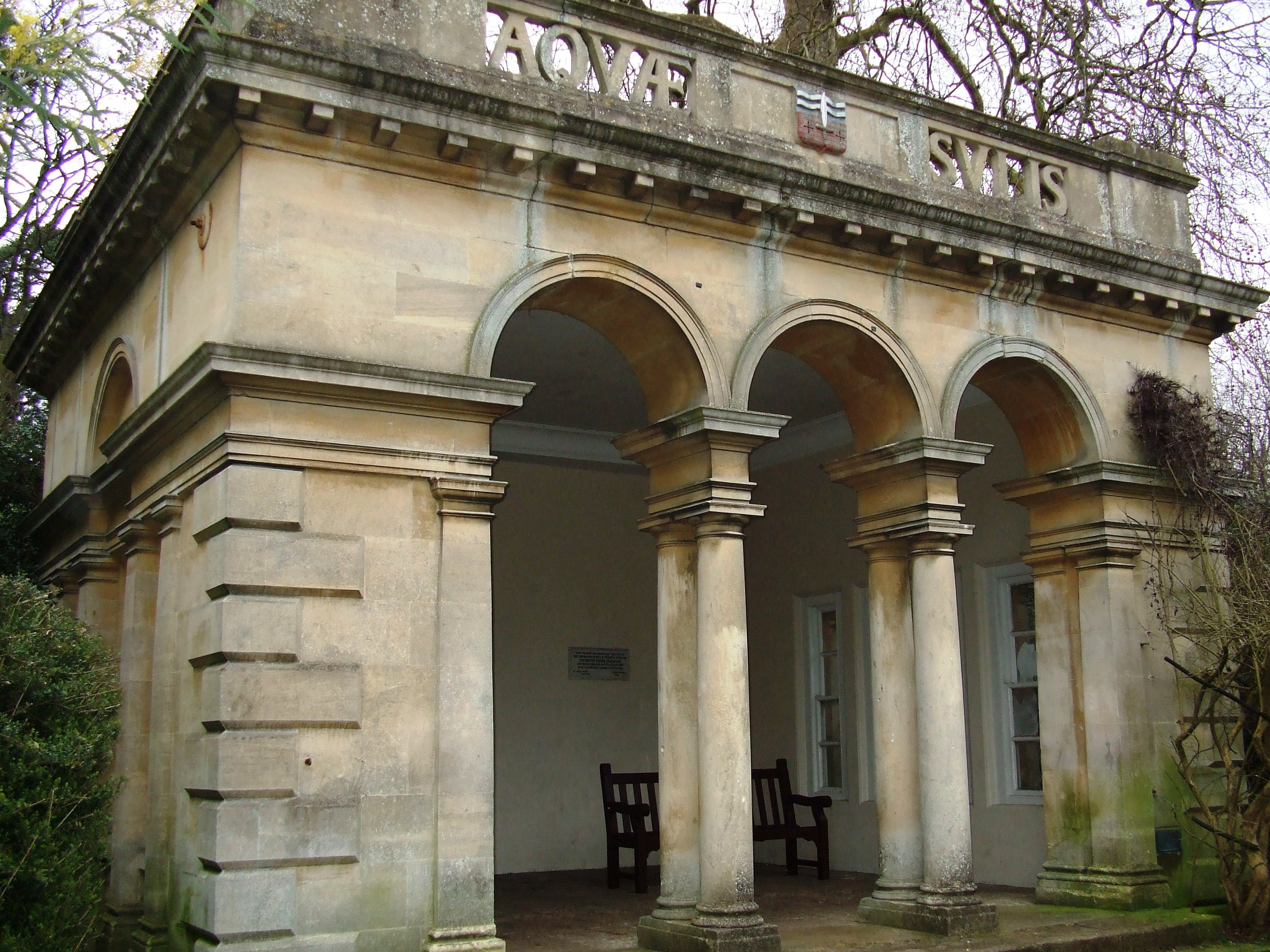
Temple of Minerva, constructed at Wembley in 1924 for the British Empire Exhibition, rebuilt in the Botanic gardens in 1926

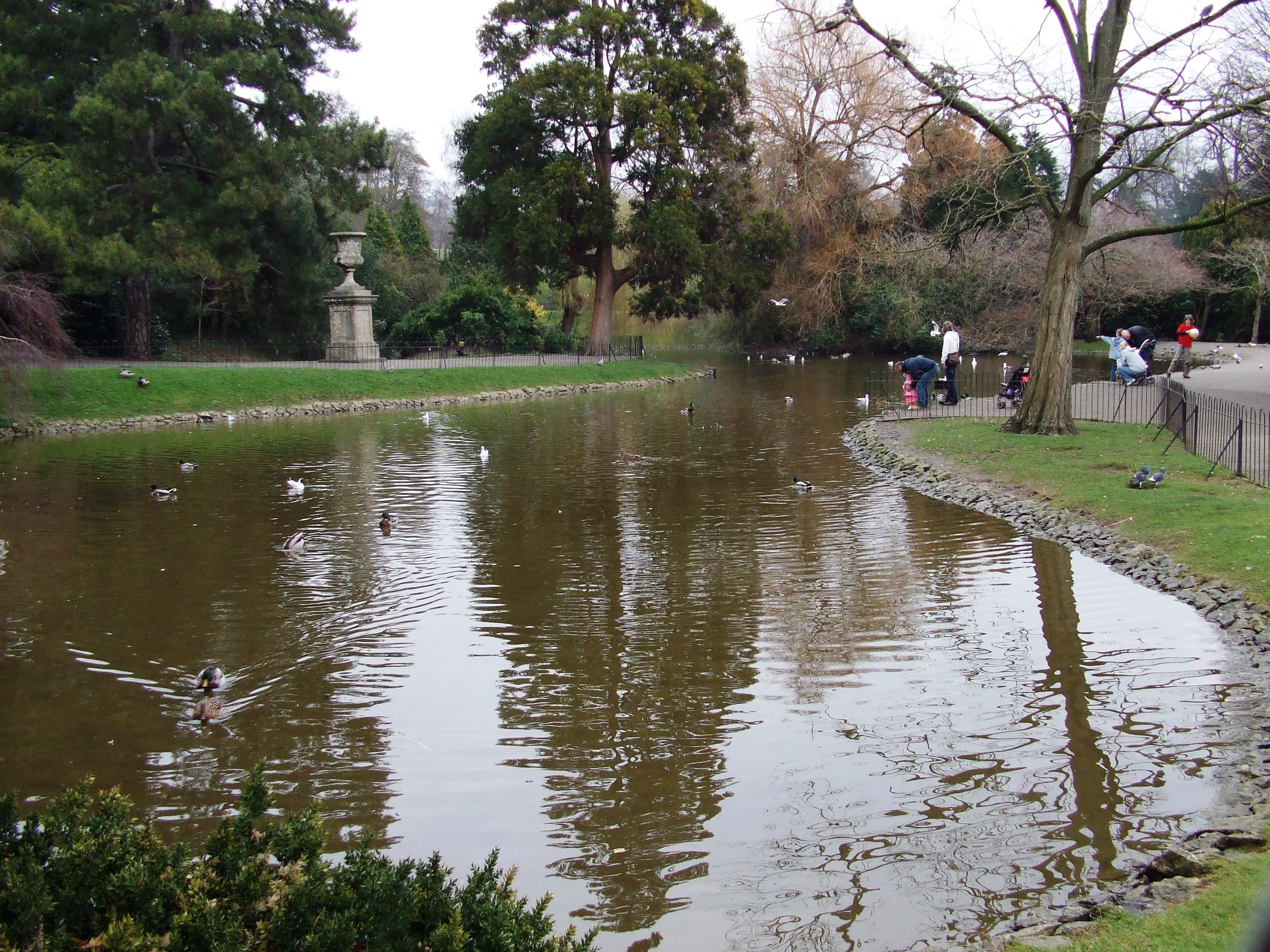
Duck pond

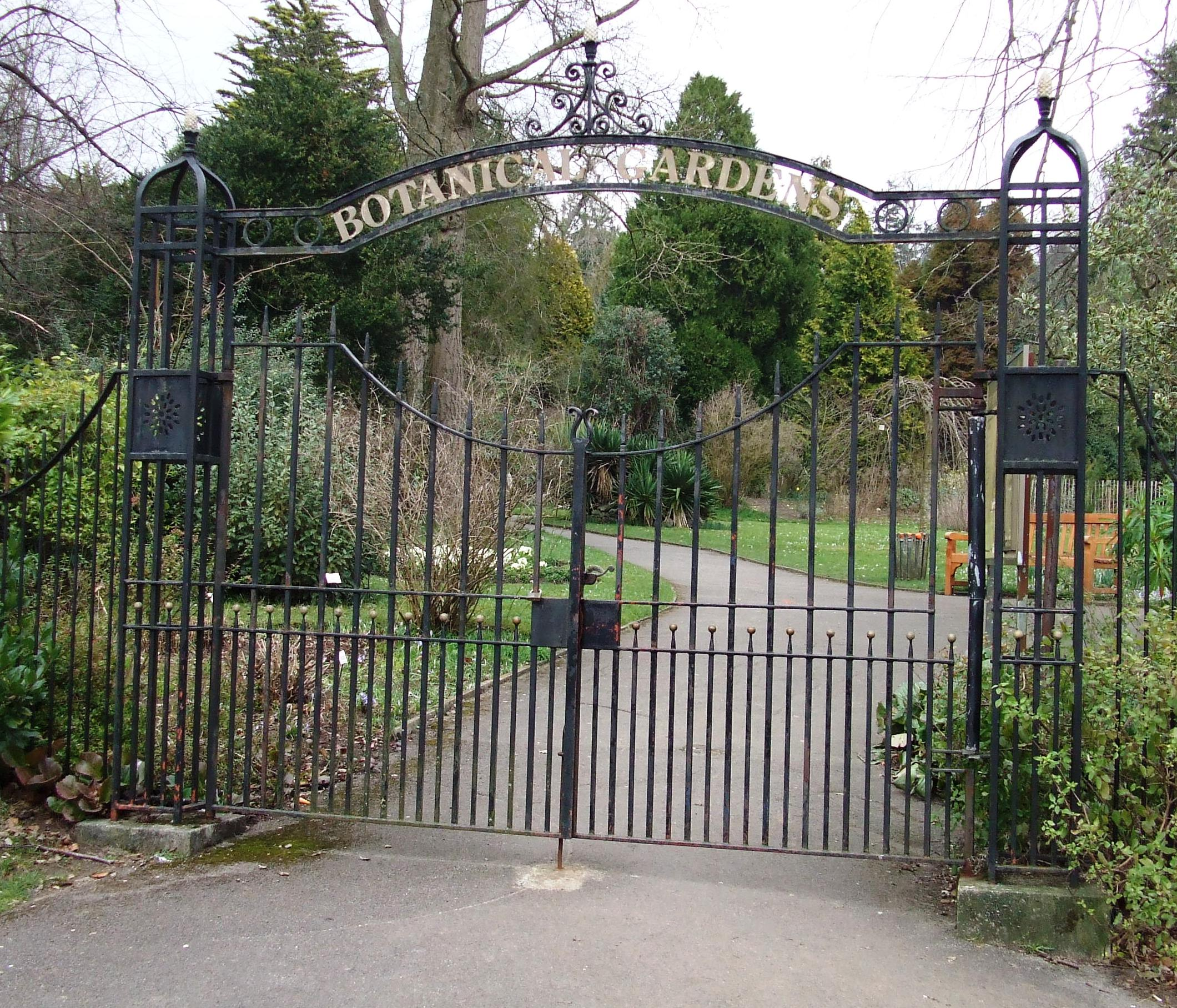
Gates to the Botanical Gardens

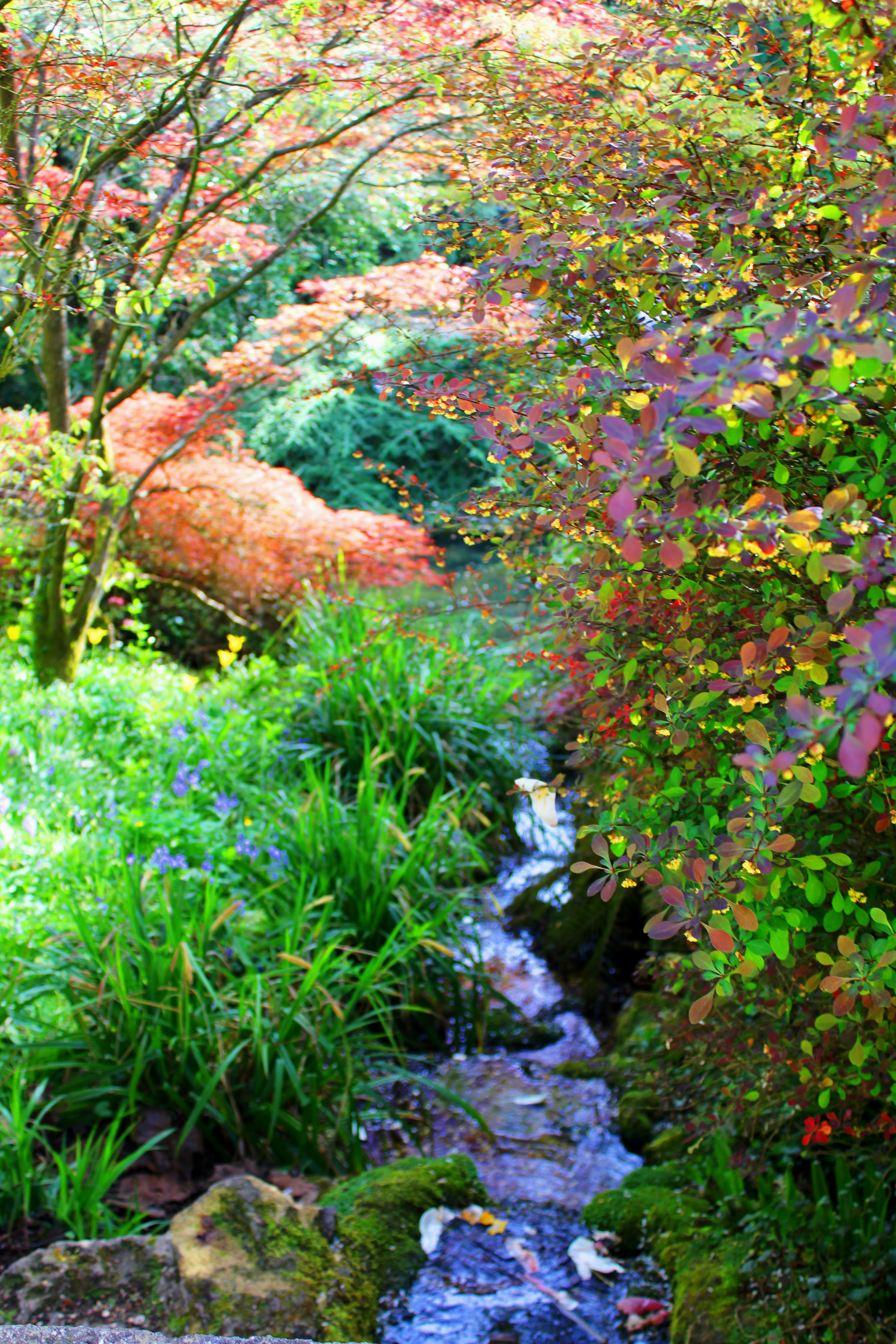
Botanical Gardens

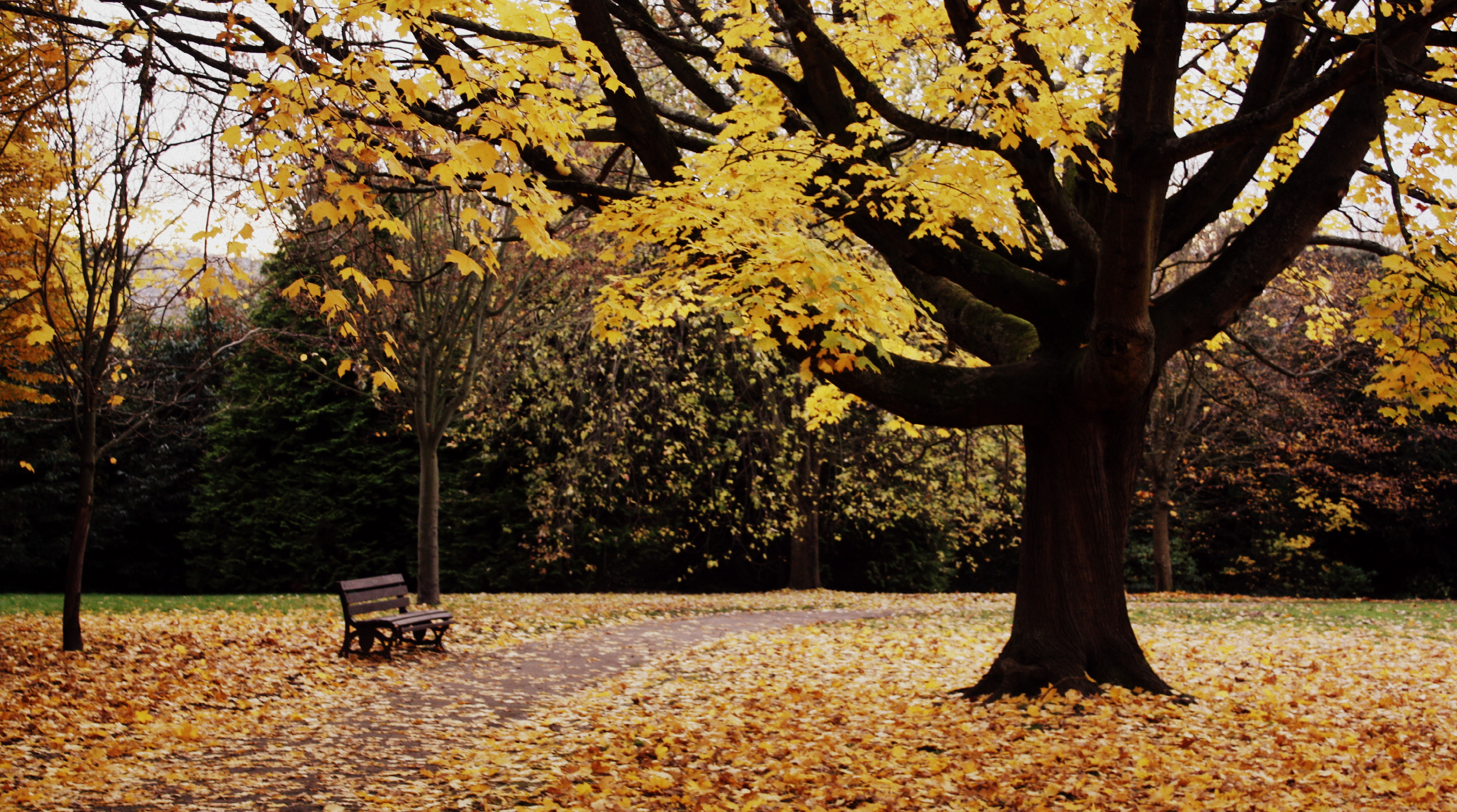
Autumn at the Royal Victoria Park

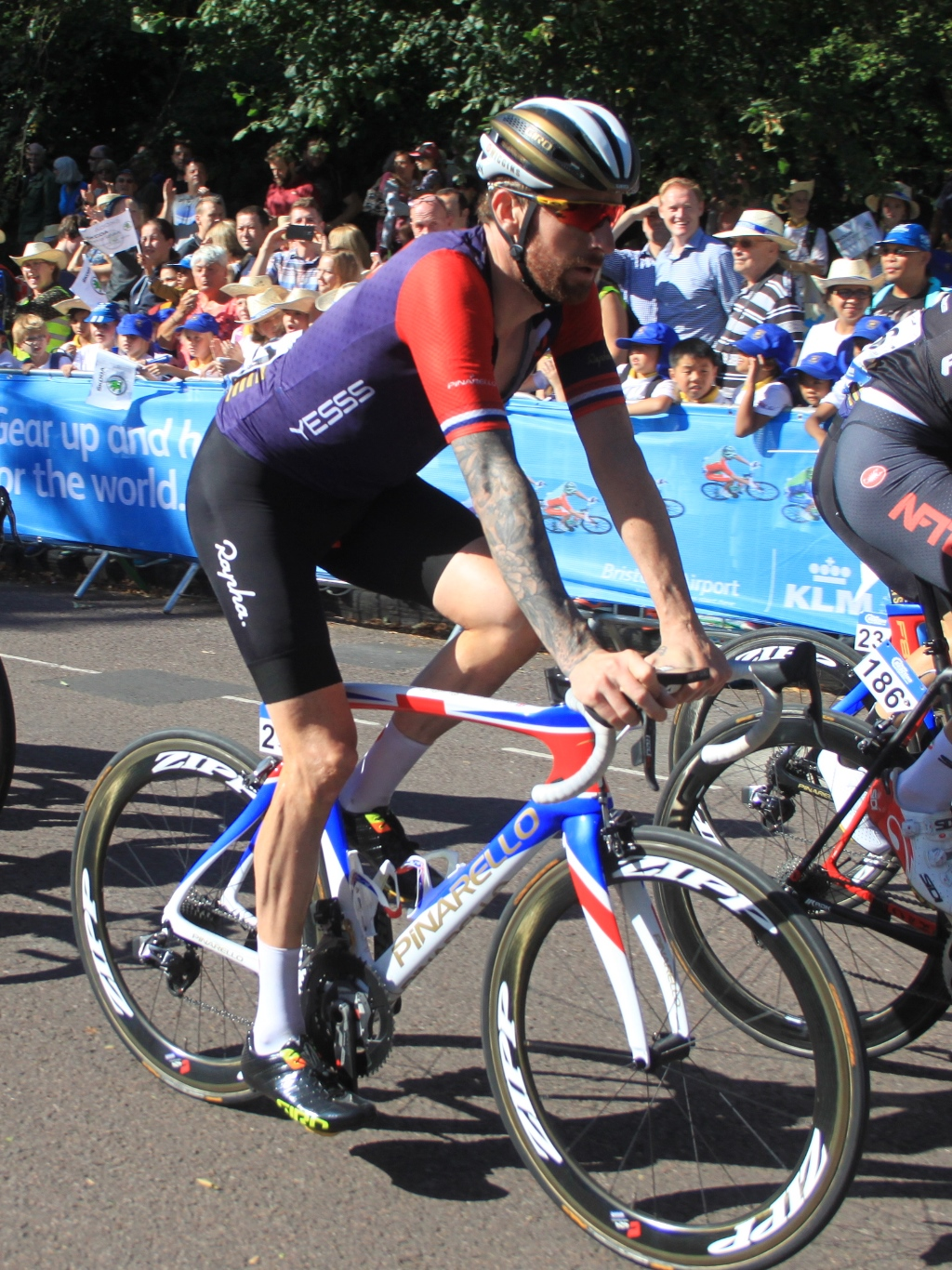
Tour of Britain event at Royal Victoria Park

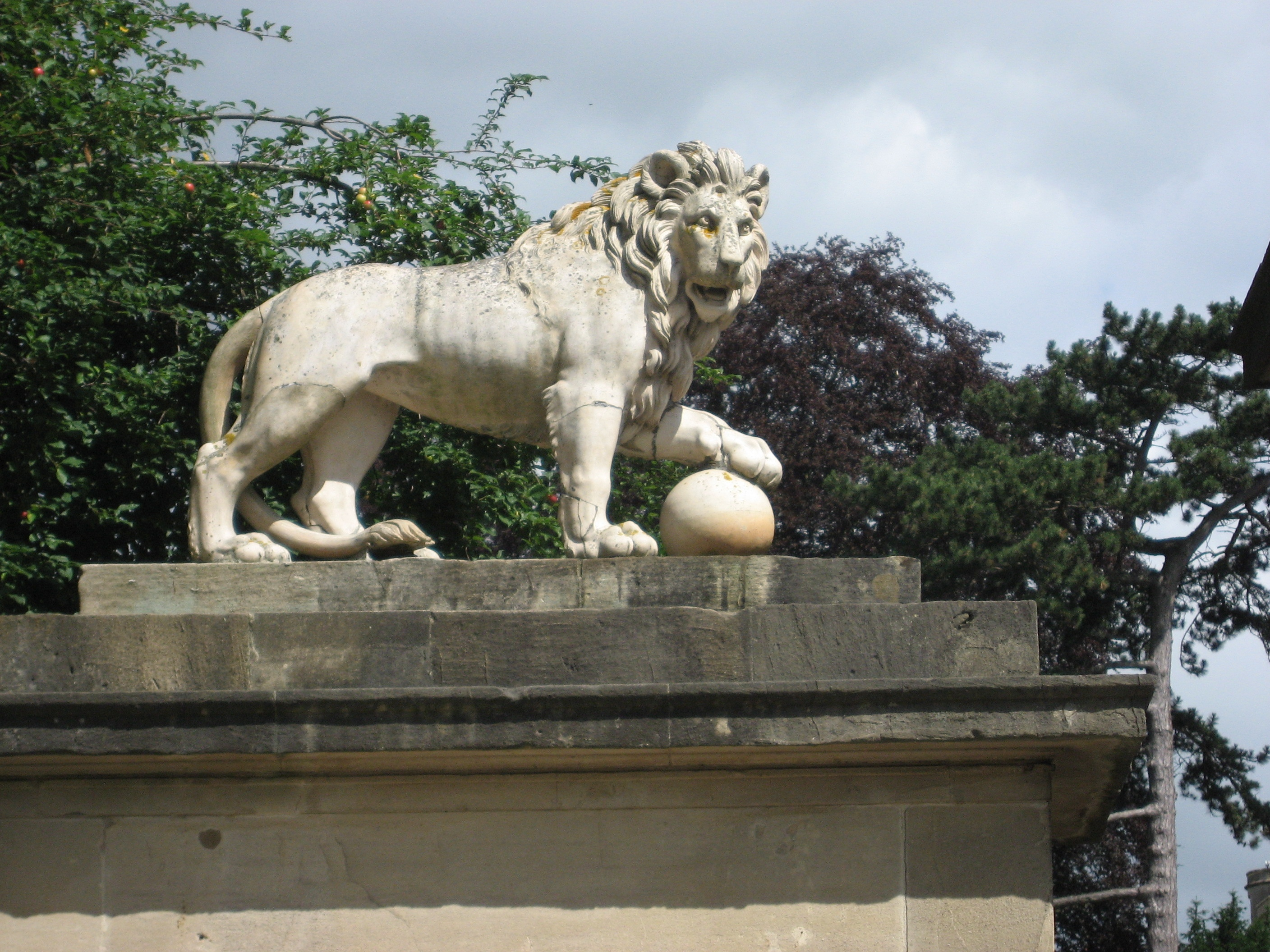
Medici Lion on the side of the Queen's Gate
