= Bath Preservation Trust =

UK charity

Coordinates: 51.3865°N 2.367°W

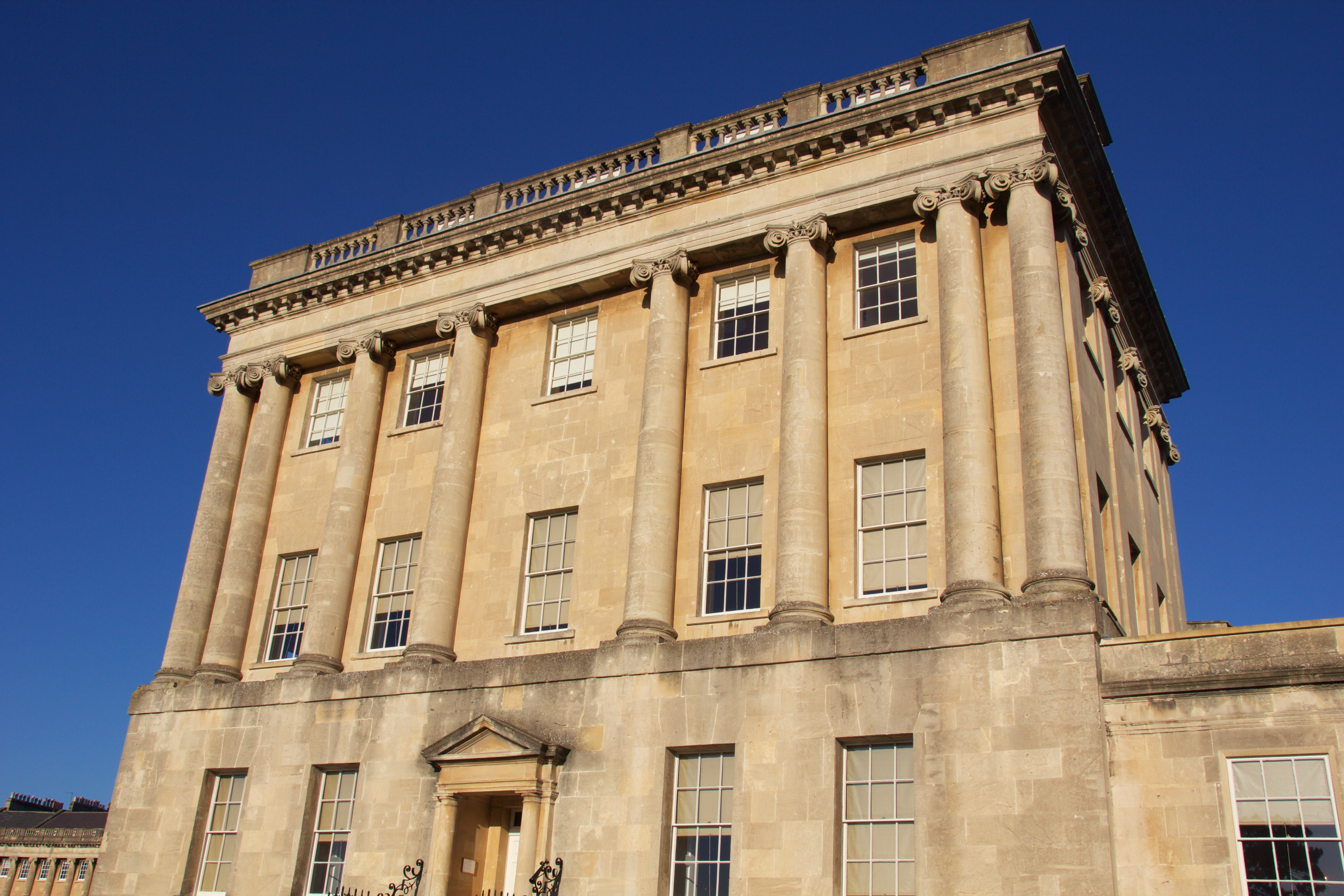
- No. 1 Royal Crescent
- Formation: 7 December 1934
- Type: Registered Charity; Company limited by guarantee
- Registration no.: 203048
- Purpose: Building Preservation Trust, civic society, and operator of museums.
- Headquarters: No. 1 Royal Crescent
- Location: Bath BA1 2LR
- Members: 1,470 (as of 2016)
- Chair of the Trust: Eve Salomon
- Chief Executive: Alex Sherman
- Main organ: Trustees
- Subsidiaries: The Beckford Tower Trust; No. 1 Royal Crescent Ltd; Herschel House Trust
- Budget: £460,334 (2014)
- Staff: 18
- Website: www.bath-preservation-trust.org.uk

The Bath Preservation Trust (or "BPT") is a charity that is based in Bath, Somerset, England, which exists to safeguard for the public benefit the historic character and amenities of the city, a UNESCO World Heritage Site, and its environs. BPT is independent, funded by public membership, grants, donations and income from four museums that it operates in Bath: No. 1 Royal Crescent, the Museum of Bath Architecture, Beckford's Tower, and the Herschel Museum of Astronomy.

In addition to its campaigning and educational roles, BPT comments on planning applications and takes part in planning policy consultations. It also provides limited financial assistance towards the repair or reinstatement of external architectural features (railings, window glazing bars, urns, gateposts, etc.) on listed buildings in Bath.

== History ==
Bath Preservation Trust was founded in 1934 as a small pressure group with the specific aim of fundraising to buy properties in preparation to resist the Bath Bill, which was drafted in order to drive a new east to west road through the centre of Georgian Bath. As a result of victory in this challenge the status of BPT was considerably enhanced, and it was able to propose its own agenda for preserving the city. This included restoring Prior Park's Palladian Bridge and Lansdown's Greville Monument. Following World War II damage to buildings in the city during the Baedeker raids on 25 and 26 April 1942, BPT worked with the War Damage Commission to assist people to restore their buildings. A further campaign against the "Sack of Bath" in 1967–1968 reduced the loss of heritage buildings to modern structures.

Sir John Betjeman was for over 20 years a trustee, and was vice-president from 1965 to 1971 at a time when Bath came under increasing pressure from modern developers and another proposal to build a major road through (in part, under) the city. From 1972, Sir John became the nation's Poet Laureate.

BPT is now an independent registered charity and continues to campaign to save listed buildings, of which Bath has some six and a half thousand, and to ensure a sustainable future for Bath in the context of its status as a World Heritage Site. BPT has over one thousand members and a number of corporate sponsors. Its Patron is Charles III.

In July 2015 BPT became the sole trustee of the Herschel House Trust, which owns the Herschel Museum of Astronomy.

== Activities ==
Bath Preservation Trust contributes financially to remedial works that enhance the city's Georgian character. It has rescued properties as diverse as Ralph Allen's quarry workers' cottages in Widcombe which once housed artisans who built some of Bath's great Georgian architectural set pieces, and the historically significant Beckford's Tower, now owned by the Bath Preservation Trust and run as a museum.

A significant part of BPT's work is reviewing and responding to all planning and listed building consent applications submitted to Bath and North East Somerset Council.

It also owns and runs four independent museums; No. 1 Royal Crescent, the Museum of Bath Architecture, Beckford's Tower and the Herschel Museum of Astronomy.

A small former cemetery, the Southcot Burial Ground in Widcombe, is owned by BPT, and is conserved for its wildlife and heritage.

== Headquarters ==
Bath Preservation Trust's registered address and offices are at No. 1 Royal Crescent. While most of the rooms in No. 1 operate as a museum, BPT's offices occupy the upper two floors. Since 2018, some staff have relocated to offices at the Old School House, adjacent to the Museum of Bath Architecture.

== Trustees ==
The Board of Trustees is chaired by Eve Salomon, who succeeded Thomas Sheppard in winter 2023. Earlier chairs included Edward Bayntun-Coward and Michael Fenwick Briggs, of Midford Castle.

== See also ==
- Buildings and architecture of Bath
