= Woodcraft Supply =

American woodworking specialty retail store chain

Woodcraft
- Type: Corporation
- Industry: Retail
- Founded: 1928; 98 years ago
- Founder: George Eaton; Richard Merrill
- Headquarters: Parkersburg, West Virginia, U.S.
- Number of locations: 72
- Area served: Worldwide
- Website: www.woodcraft.com

Woodcraft Supply, LLC operates woodworking specialty retail stores across the United States (including 34 of 50 U.S. states). It also publishes a woodworking industry magazine, distributes consumer catalogs (in all 50 U.S. states and 117 countries) and operates an ecommerce website. The stores, catalogs and website combined sell about 20,000 products covering wood working tools, raw materials, instructional media and project kits.

== History ==
Woodcraft was founded in 1928 by George Eaton and Richard Merrill in Boston, Massachusetts.

In the 1960s, Roger Wells bought Woodcraft and moved the headquarters to Woburn, Massachusetts. Woodcraft moved into a warehouse and corporate office after the success of its initial printed ads which led to creation of its catalog. Sam Ross, founder of SBR Inc., bought Woodcraft in 1972 and used his retail experience to build new stores and grow the company. In 1992, Sam Ross moved Woodcraft headquarters to Parkersburg, West Virginia.

In May 2012, Jody Garrett was promoted to president of Woodcraft. Previously Garrett held the position of vice president of marketing and merchandising and publisher of Woodcraft Magazine.

In July 2018 Jack Bigger was named president/chief operating officer. Bigger was previously vice president of sales and marketing at Woodcraft.

Woodcraft opened a new Boston area corporate location in Walpole, Massachusetts in 2013. That same year, Woodcraft and the Swiss toolmaker Pfeil celebrated 50 years as international business partners.

In 2014, Woodcraft implemented new enterprise resource planning software to optimize order processing and business processes.

== Operations ==
=== Online ===
Woodcraft operates several domain names. The main retail website includes instructional support material in addition to ecommerce.

In 2010, Woodcraft acquired the WoodcraftPlans.com business. Woodcraft Plans, which in spite of its name, had no previous relationship to Woodcraft, added 1,200 new woodworking project plans to the Woodcraft offering that already included Woodcraft Magazine’s Classic® Project Plans.

The domain woodcraft.com attracted 4,636,000 visitors in 2014 according to a Compete.com survey, with a peak in December of over 5,000,000.

=== Magazine ===
Woodcraft Magazine, a bi-monthly publication first published in November 2004, features professionally designed projects, woodworking techniques and tools. A.J. Hamler was the founding editor of Woodcraft Magazine.

In 2007, Woodcraft took measures to enhance Woodcraft Magazine by hiring Jim Harrold, previous executive editor of Wood magazine, to become editor-in-chief of Woodcraft Magazine.

In 2014, Woodcraft launched a publishing venture focused on the magazine’s 10th anniversary. The magazine was delivered with additional paper and digital formats featuring the first five years of content.

In 2015, Jim Harrold retired and Tim Snyder succeeded Harrold, directing a major redesign of Woodcraft Magazine and woodcraftmagazine.com. Snyder’s previous experience included executive editor of American Woodworking magazine, executive editor of Fine Homebuilding magazine, and a book division editor of Taunton Press.

In 2017 Chad McClung became Editor-in-chief. Chad started working with Woodcraft Magazine as a freelance graphic designer in 2007. He was later hired full-time as the assistant art director, then became art director in 2009. Chad spent 2016 as a managing editor before taking the helm in 2017.

=== Exclusive Brands ===
Woodcraft exclusively carries some brands, including:

- Pinnacle
- Highpoint
- WoodRiver

== Sponsorships ==
In 2010, Woodcraft became the sole sponsor to Rough Cut – Woodworking with Tommy Mac, which aired nationally on public television stations and the CREATE cable channel beginning in October 2010. Rough Cut was produced by WGBH-BOSTON, which also developed how-to television shows such as The Victory Garden and The New Yankee Workshop.

In 2015 Woodcraft entered a partnership with Black Dog Salvage, a Roanoke, Virginia architectural salvage firm that is featured on Salvage Dawgs, a DIY Network TV reality series. This was an effort to promote Woodcraft’s upcycling program that encourages reclaiming and repurposing items such as wood furniture.

== Philanthropy ==
In 1985, Woodcraft began participating in the Partnership in Education tutoring program with Wood County, West Virginia public schools. In 2003, Woodcraft was an initial partner in the Results-based Business Partnership Program that focuses on improving student achievement in West Virginia middle schools and high schools.

Woodcraft Turn for Troops program began in 2004. It provides free pen kits to retail stores for customers and employees to turn the wooden pens, which are then distributed by Woodcraft corporate employees to US soldiers who are actively deployed or in rehabilitation facilities. By 2012, Woodcraft distributed 97,717 hand turned wooden pens.

Woodcraft began supporting the Blennerhassett Hotel Festival of Trees to Benefit Easter Seals in 2012. Woodcraft employees provide handcrafted ornaments and tree stand base for a Christmas tree that is donated for auction.
