= Salvage Dawgs =

American reality television series

- Genre: Reality television
- Starring: Robert Kulp; Mike Whiteside; Tay Whiteside; Grayson Goldsmith
- Country of origin: United States
- Original language: English
- No. of seasons: 11
- No. of episodes: 143

Production
- Production locations: Pittsburgh, Pennsylvania, Roanoke, Virginia

Original release
- Release: November 8, 2012 – January 30, 2020

Salvage Dawgs is an American reality television series detailing the experiences of Mike Whiteside and Robert Kulp, co-owners of the architectural salvage store Black Dog Salvage, as they negotiate for bids on vintage architectural elements inside buildings that are planned to be demolished. First airing on November 8, 2012 to mild audience reception, the show ran for 11 seasons on the DIY Network and ended in January 2020, citing problems related to the COVID-19 pandemic.

== Background ==
The show is centered around employees of Black Dog Salvage – a salvage company based out of Roanoke, Virginia that finds, acquires, and eventually sells valuable (yet abandoned or soon-to-be destroyed) pieces of construction salvage. According to Whiteside and Kulp, Black Dog Salvage was established when the pair found themselves in possession of a large vinyl sign, managing to sell it soon after coming across it. This sale led to the evolution from simple garage sales to the purchase of a company warehouse, where they now operate.

== Production ==
In 2020, the series ceased production due to the coronavirus outbreak, in addition to the sale of DIY Network. and its transformation into Magnolia Network.

== See also ==
- Woodcraft Supply
