= Salvage Hunters =

UK antiques television series

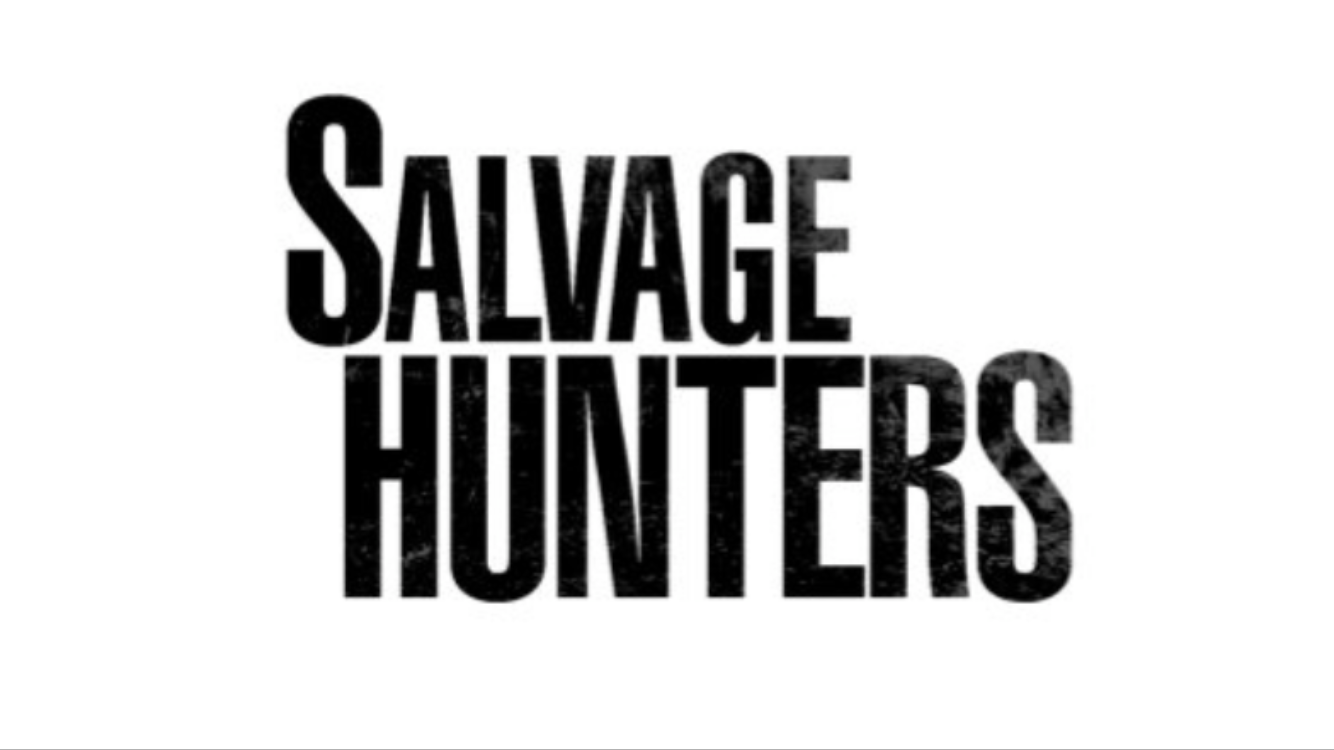
- Starring: Drew Pritchard
- Narrated by: Ralph Ineson
- Country of origin: United Kingdom
- Original language: English
- No. of series: 19

Production
- Executive producers: Simon Lloyd; Ian Russell; Brigette Vincent; Rob Carey; Caroline Blackadder
- Producers: Rob Carey; John Vandervelde
- Running time: 60 minutes
- Production companies: Cineflix (seasons 1–4); Curve Media (season 5–)

Original release
- Network: Quest
- Release: 14 November 2011 – present

Salvage Hunters is a British television programme in which decorative salvage dealer Drew Pritchard travels throughout the country in search of antiques from shops, fairs and old mansions to re-sell online or in his shop.

The programme has aired on Quest since 2011, for 19 series.

== Format overview ==
Each episode features Drew Pritchard visiting a number of locations to find collectable stock to resell. The format includes travelling to the locations, the purchase of various items after some haggling on prices, and a product style explanation, then the drive back to his base in Conwy, showing the purchases to his team, the restoration process, and items being photographed for sale. There is a final summary of the deal, and often of the price achieved after an item has been sold.

The sellers include private estates, antiques shops, trade markets and private individuals.

Buying trips abroad included Belgium, France, Germany, Hungary, Italy, Netherlands, Norway, Portugal, Republic of Ireland and Spain.

The series is narrated by Ralph Ineson.

== Production ==
The series was announced on 25 October 2011, when Discovery Networks International commissioned a modern day treasure hunting series for its free-to-air channel Quest from Cineflix Productions UK, the British production arm of Canadian global production company Cineflix called Salvage Hunters with antique expert Drew Pritchard presenting the series.

When season 4 of Salvage Hunters started broadcasting on Quest and when the series was renewed for season 5, producer Cineflix announced a management buyout of its British production arm Cineflix Productions UK by the executives of Salvage Hunters Camillia Lewis and Rob Carey, the two launched unscripted production company Curve Media and taken over production of Salvage Hunters

== Spin-off programmes ==
- Salvage Hunters: Best Buys
- Salvage Hunters: Bitesize
- Salvage Hunters: The Restorers
- Salvage Hunters: Classic Cars
- Salvage Hunters: Design Classics
- Salvage Hunters: Best Restorations
- Salvage Hunters: Best of Europe
- Salvage Hunters: Georgian House Restoration

== Transmissions ==
Series	Start date	End date	Episodes
1	14 November 2011	16 January 2012	10
2	25 February 2012		10
3	23 September 2013	2013	10
4	2013	2014	10
5	13 August 2014	15 October 2014	10
6	25 March 2015	20 May 2015	10
7	30 September 2015	2 December 2015	10
8	27 January 2016	30 March 2016	10
9	7 September 2016	14 December 2016	15
10	18 January 2017	7 June 2017	15
11	13 September 2017	27 November 2017	12
12	14 February 2018	27 June 2018	15
13	17 October 2018	10 April 2019	15
14	11 September 2019	2 December 2020	23
15	10 February 2021	14 April 2021	10
16	9 February 2022	26 October 2022	15
17	15 February 2023	25 October 2023	15
18	7 February 2024	28 August 2024	15
19	30 October 2024	26 February 2025	15
20	17 July 2025	27 November 2025	20

== See also ==
- American Pickers
- Salvage Dawgs
