= Unga Örnar =

Non-profit organisation based in Sweden

- Formation: 7 November 1931
- Type: Children and youth organization
- Legal status: Non-profit organisation
- Headquarters: Stockholm, Sweden
- President: Yasmine Bladelius
- Website: ungaornar.se

Unga Örnar (Young Eagles), officially Unga Örnars Riksförbund (Young Eagles' Realm League), is a children's organisation in Sweden. Unga Örnar was founded on 7 November 1931 by the labour movement and the Swedish Social Democratic Youth League (SSU), to function as a secular organisation for leisure and cultural activities for working class children. In 1933, Unga Örnar was declared as a non-partisan organization, albeit it remains linked with the labour movement. As of 2023, the organization claims a membership of around 6,000 nation-wide.

== History ==
The foundation of Unga Örnar was inspired by the Austrian organisation Rote Falken ('Red Falcons') which was founded in 1925. During its early stages, activities of Unga Örnar were similar to the scout movement and members carried uniforms. However, in 1933 a legislation was introduced prohibiting political organizations to use uniforms. To circumvent the law Unga Örnar was declared to be formally to be independent from the Social Democratic Party, albeit with strengthened connections to Arbetarnas Bildningsförbund ('Workers Educational Association', ABF).

Until the 1960s, a uniform called the 'eagle suit' was worn throughout the organisation. It consisted of a blue shirt with an embroidered eagle, a red kerchief, and an elastic band that could be green, blue, red, or white, depending on the wearers' age and role.

In 1991, Unga Örnar and the International Falcon Movement – Socialist Educational International organised a world camp at Himmelstalundsfältet in Norrköping. Around 9,000 people from 52 countries participated in the event, which was the biggest camp ever of IFM-SEI.

Unga Örnar, along with other civil society organisations, advocated from 1994 onwards for the incorporation of the UN Convention on the Rights of the Child into Swedish law (which was done in 2020).

== Activities ==
The members in Unga Örnar are active in the decision-making processes of the organisation. At its 2019 congress, 89 percent of the delegates were between the ages of 6 and 25.

Examples of activities that Unga Örnar organise are summer camps, democracy clubs, craft clubs, theatre groups, and homework assistance. They also have park games and youth recreation centers in certain municipalities.

=== International activities ===
Unga Örnar also has international operations, which in large part are done together with the Olof Palme International Center. Through supporting and working together with non-profit organisations in Zimbabwe, Namibia, and Palestine, Unga Örnar attempts to work with issues related to peace, democracy, social justice and human rights.
