= Esplai =

Voluntary association in Spain

- Type: Non-profit voluntary association
- Purpose: Educating children during their free time
- Region served: Catalan Countries
- Members: 45,000 (2022)

An esplai is a non-profit voluntary association that works in the field of educating children during their free time. It has its origins in the Scout Movement, and has been popular in certain areas of Spain since the 1960s. Esplais Catalans is the largest and most representative federation in Catalonia.

How it works and activities: The Esplai is an entity that works with children and has different ways of work. It could be compared to an extra-curricular activity or summer camps, and it is often known as a place where children can partake in weekly gatherings for two to three hours every weekend. Children and teenagers can take part in activities that are dynamized by a monitor, who works in a given group as a referent. Along all kinds of activities they participate in, children and teens are guided to achieve some values, norms and attitudes set previously by the monitor, which follow the entity's plans and guidelines. Many of these gatherings can take place outside their habitual place, due to most of these activities not being dependant on where they are carried out.

The Esplais are aimed to fulfil a community service and educate children and teenagers to grow up with another perspective in life and with a higher social commitment with their environment.

Educacional Ideas: Every entity has their own ideologies, where they expose their objectives, values or anything else they want to work towards. All these aspects are collected and explained in a document called PEC (Educational project of the center/ Projecte Educatiu del Centre). In that document, the entity analyzes their social environment, as well as short and long-term objectives.

Apart from these entity ideals, the monitors lay out specific objectives related to the characteristics of each age group, and they plan the activities to focus the items that they want to work on. When planning activities, they have to be adapted to the corresponding age group, and the PEC and objectives help their development to target and work with themes that are interesting for them or that they want to learn about. Usually, families are considered part of the Esplai as well, as its whole concept is thought not to be considered as a babysitting service, but as an educational space through leisure .

History: The Esplai concept was born in 1876 with the organization Appenzell (Swiss). However, it wasn't until 1960 that they were recognized with their current name.

== Overview ==
In 2023, the Esplais had over 45,000 members in Catalonia, where the Scout Movement co-exists and is very popular as well.

Esplac, also known as Esplais Catalans, is a full member of the International Falcon Movement - Socialist Education International and has a presidium member for the Europe Region along with their sister organisation in the UK Woodcraft Folk.

Esplais have less of a hierarchical structure than the Scouts, but they work in a similar way. They play games, do arts and crafts, have discussions and go on trips. There is a pedagogical aim behind it which promotes the integral development of the child. Typically, an Esplai centre can have about 100 children and 20 educators.
