= Aina Vidal =

Spanish politician (born 1985)

Aina Vidal MP
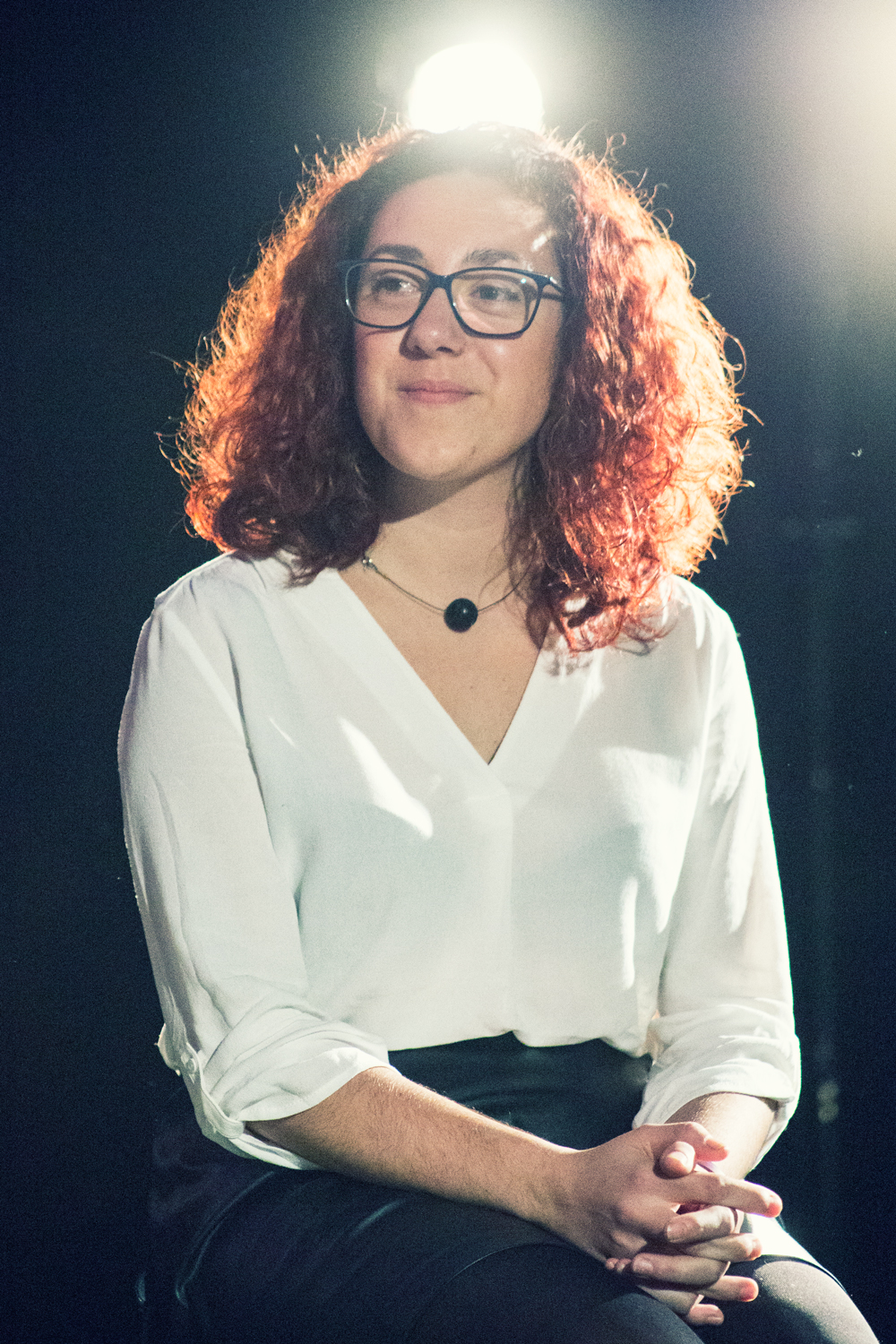

Deputy Spokesperson of Sumar in the Congress of Deputies
- Incumbent
- Assumed office 28 August 2023

Member of the Congress of Deputies
- Incumbent
- Assumed office 13 January 2016
- Constituency: Barcelona

Personal details
- Born: Aina Vidal Sáez; March 22, 1985 (age 41) Barcelona, Spain
- Party: Catalunya en Comú (since 2017); Green Left (since 2021)
- Other political affiliations: Initiative for Catalonia Greens (2005–2019)
- Occupation: Politician

Aina Vidal Sáez (22 March 1985, Barcelona, Spain) is a Spanish politician, deputy for Barcelona in the Congress of Deputies in the XI, XII, XIII, XIV and XV legislatures. She is a member of the National Council of Esquerra Verda.

== Political career ==
She has been a member of EV–IPV since 2005 and of Workers' Commissions since 2006. She is a member of the National Council of Iniciativa per Catalunya-Greens and National Coordinator of Youth Action of the National Workers' Commission of Catalonia, and a member of the Labour Relations Council of Catalonia. She has been a member of the Consell Nacional de la Joventut de Catalunya and the Consell de Joventut de Barcelona. He is also a member of Som Energia, Médecins Sans Frontières, Amnesty International and Esplais Catalans, as well as of the federal committee of Catalonia Workers' Commissions.

She was elected deputy for Barcelona in the 2015 Spanish general elections as part of the En Comú Podem list, being one of the three deputies that ICV obtained within the coalition (together with Josep Vendrell and Jaume Moya). She retained her seat in the 2016 general elections, in the April 2019 general elections and in the November 2019 general elections.

In the general elections of 23 July 2023 he ran as head of the list for the Barcelona constituency for the electoral coalition Sumar. In the election campaign he took part in the 7 debate organised by RTVE as spokesperson for Sumar.

On 30 October 2024, when she was asked why the Spanish Congress hadn't suspended the session for the day, provided the floods in Valencia that were causing hundreds of deaths, she replied "We, deputies, are not here to bail out water in Valencia".
