= Rock art in Sweden =

The Rock art in Sweden (Swedish: Hällbilder or Hällmålningar) is the richest artistic material from the north of prehistoric Europe. Older scholarship mostly saw it as evidence for the religious practices of the Nordic Bronze Age (c. 1500-500 BC). Newer research sees the art not only as depictions of cultic rituals but also as source material for cultural history and social hierarchies. The production of rock art required significant effort, so they must have had important meaning for their creators. Regional variations show that local populations, not travelling artists, were responsible for them.

== Imagery ==
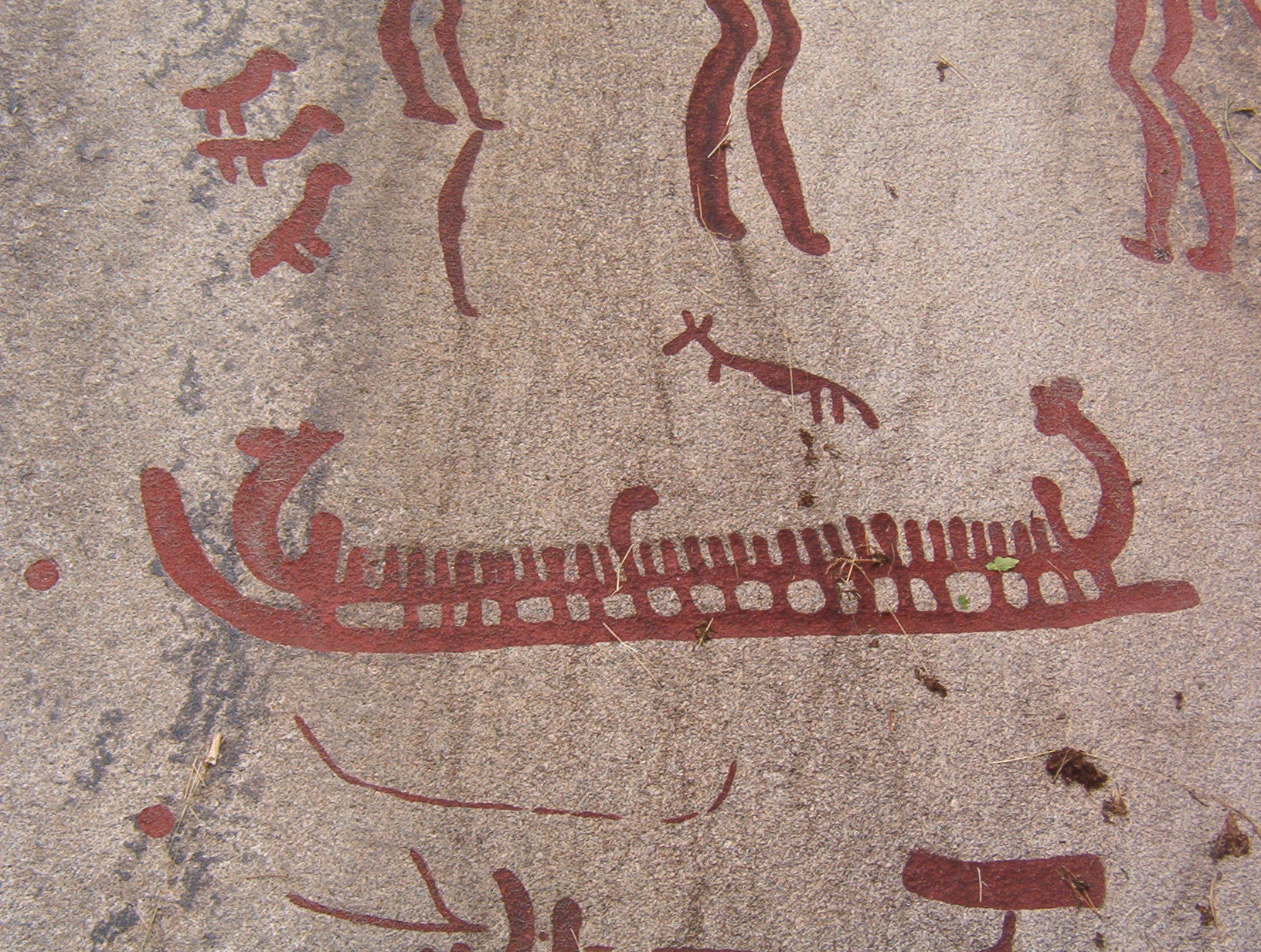
Rock art in Tanum (Bohuslän)

The main motifs are the same in all areas. In details and execution, however, there are variations. Some motifs are markedly more common in certain areas and rare in others. Some images are of monumental size, others are very small. Remarkably large images can be seen in Bohuslän, which are also amongst the best known. The most common images are people, agriculture and stock raising, hunting and fishing, cult and religion (e.g. the Sun cross), often with wheels, carts, ships, and weapons.

There is very high variation in Bohuslän. Images of ships with large crews of rowers driving into one another, alternate with images of men wielding swords and axes, sometimes on horseback. Worshippers with raised hands and separated fingers, Lur players, and dancers appear. Images of wild and domesticated animals, as well as carts and ploughmen show agricultural practices. However, there are no images of buildings.

== Technique ==
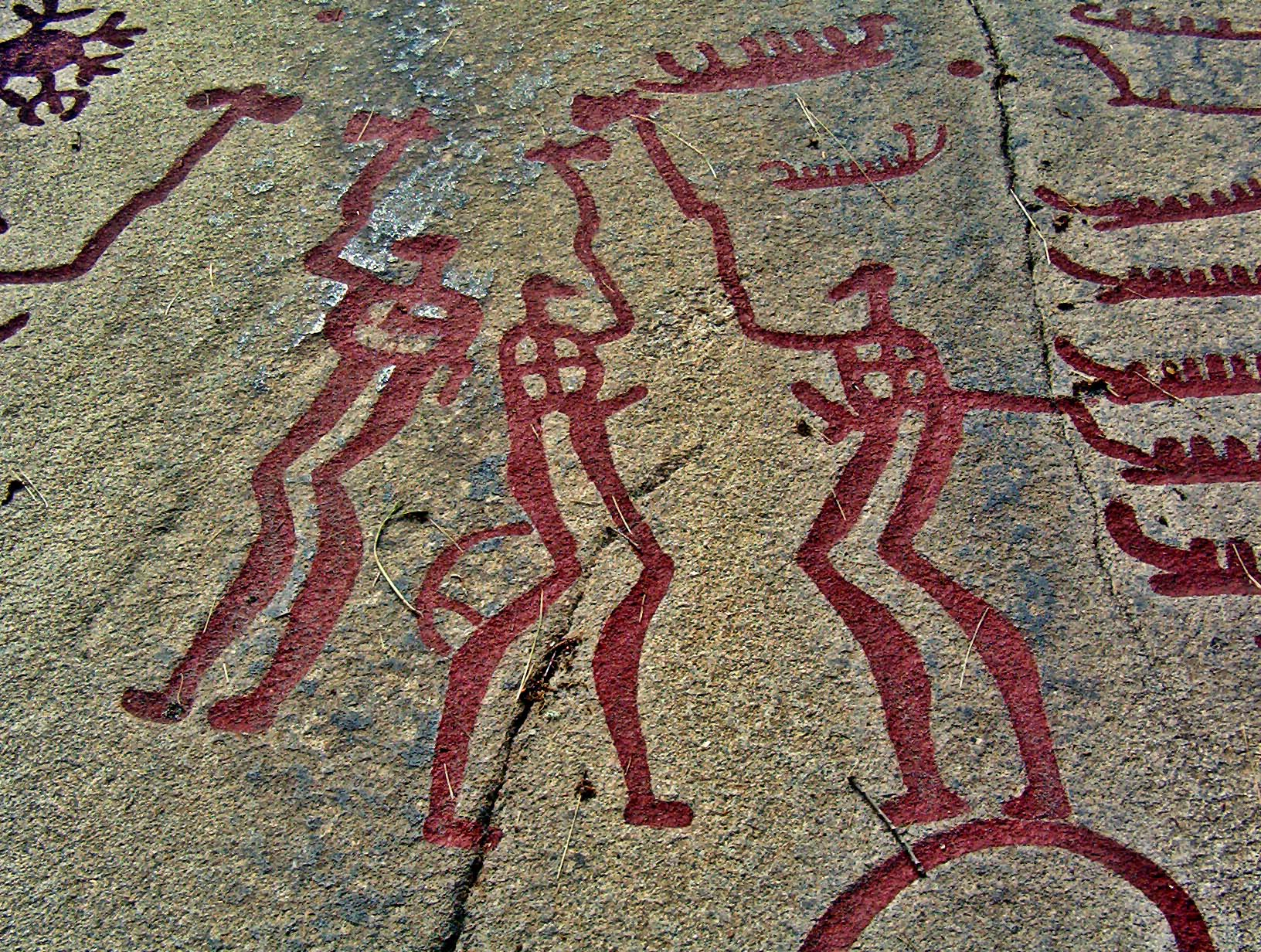
Rock art in Tanum (Bohuslän)

Except for northern Scandinavia, where images of the Arctic hunt were created with paint, the images are carved into rock faces. Rock faces created by glacial striation offered ideal surfaces for art. However, the hard material put limits on what could be depicted.

The images are scratched a few millimetres into the stone. On account of the low relief, many images are difficult to make out. Only cup and ring marks have a depth of multiple centimetres. In brittle granite and gneiss, the edges are always broken, but the reason for this is not clear. As a rule it is not possible to determine whether images have been reworked at a later time. Most will have been made using an unmodified stone as a tool with which to scratch or pick out the image. Quartz may have been favoured for this. This is certainly true for the flat images, in which the image was carved out of the stone, appearing as a silhouette in the rock face. Only rarely do such images contain internal divisions. This technique is mainly found in eastern Scandinavia.

Occasionally, the use of a sharp tool, probably made of metal can be detected. This is especially true of images which were carved as outlines - a technique which predominated in western Scandinavia. This technique was used for the images at Högsby in Dalsland, where argillaceous slate was favourable to this method. Very finely carved images were thus produced. This indicates that the metal used was not bronze, but probably a hard tin alloy.

Suitable rock faces are almost exclusively found on Bornholm and the Scandinavian peninsula. Because of the lack of large rock faces in Denmark and Northern Germany, glacial erratics were used instead. Since the flat space available on these was much smaller, most only have a few lines or a single image.

== Distribution ==
Rock art density

There are rock carvings in all the southern and central Swedish provinces, except Närke. In Värmland, they occur only on the Värmlandsnäs peninsula on the shores of Lake Vänern. Petroglyphs are especially common:

- In northern Bohuslän (Massleberg) up to Østfold in Norway,
- Around Enköping in southwestern Uppland,
- At Himmelstalund near Norrköping in central Östergötland
- In southeaster Schonen (at Simrishamn).
- At Nämforsen (Stromschnelle) in Ångermanland, where images of the northern Scandinavian (hunter) and southern Scandinavian (farmer) types meet.

There are concentrations of carvings:

- In the parish of Tisselskog in Dalsland,
- On the coast northwest of Västervik, (Småland),
- Horsahallen in the parish of Torhamn, in eastern Blekinge.

Beyond these areas, individual carvings occur through the mainland and on the islands of Öland and Gotland. The limestone of the islands weathers easily and as a result does not generally preserve these images well.

== See also ==
- Rock art in Denmark
- Rock Carvings in Tanum
- Rock Carvings of Boglösa
- Rock Art in Västerbottens län

== Bibliography ==
- Mårten Stenberger: Vorgeschichte Schwedens. (= Nordische Vorzeit. Vol. 4). Wachholtz, Neumünster 1977, ISBN 3-529-01805-8, p. 182.
- Torsten Capelle: Geschlagen in Stein. Skandinavische Felsbilder der Bronzezeit. (= Begleithefte zu Ausstellungen der Abteilung Urgeschichte des Niedersächsischen Landesmuseums Hannover. Vol. 1). Lax, Hannover (recte: Hildesheim) 1985, ISBN 3-7848-1009-8.
- Johan Ling: Elevated rock art. Towards a maritime understanding of Bronze Age rock art in northern Bohuslän, Sweden. (= GOTARC, Series B: Gothenburg Archaeological Theses. Vol. 49). 2nd Edition. Göteborgs Universitet, Institut för Arkeologi och Antikens Kultur, Göteborg 2008, ISBN 9781782977629.
