= Kurt Löwenstein =

German politician (1885–1939)

Kurt Löwenstein (18 May 1885 – 8 May 1939) was a German politician, socialist reform pedagogue, and one of the founders of the Socialist Youth of Germany – The Falcons.

== Family and education ==
Löwenstein was born in Bleckede. His father Bernhard Löwenstein had a clothing shop, which brought the family a modest income. His mother Jeanette, born Blumenthal, died of cancer in 1892. In 1895, Kurt Löwenstein went to a Jewish private school in Hanover. In 1899, he went to high school where he earned tuition by delivering newspapers and holding after-classes where he helped school classmates with homework.

Between 1904 and 1907, Löwenstein studied Theology and Philosophy in Halberstadt and he was accepted into the orthodox Rabbi school in Berlin. At the same time he also attended philosophical and pedagogical courses at the Friedrich-Wilhelm University. In 1908, he was offered the position of the Rabbi in Hanover but refused it because of religious doubts.

On 29 April 1911, he married Mara Kerwel (1891–1969), a chemist. When they got married, they signed the following marriage contract which is a proof of their progressive thinking and acting concerning gender equality:

§1 On 1 April 1911 both of the contracties, out of free choice and based on love, agree to found the marriage upon equal rights and responsibilities.

§2 As long as the marriage will last, both contracties and their offspring will use the common name Kerlöw which derives from the marriage.

§3 To legalise the use of this name, state permission should be pursued. If this permission is not given, the contracties promise to use the name in all non administrative areas of life.

§4 To be lawfully wedded both of the contracties will also subject to the state marital contract. However, by a word of honour they declare that the responsibilities and rights, described in the state marital contract will not apply as they find them redundant.

In 1910, he finished his Ph.D thesis on Jean-Marie Guyau's pedagogic concepts.

== Politics ==
A pacifist, Löwenstein applied to join the Red Cross in 1914 in Grodno (Belarus) where he took care of injured soldiers until 1918. In the meantime he joined Soldatenraete, German Socialist soldier councils, and identified himself as a Socialist. He joined the Independent Social Democratic Party of Germany (Unabhängigen Sozialdemokratischen Partei Deutschlands - USPD) and became active especially in forming the positions on education and educational politics of the party.

In June 1920, he was elected as a member of the National Parliament until 1923 as a member of the USPD and from 1923 to 1933 as a Member of the SPD. In September 1920 he was elected an Educational Counselor of Berlin by Election Committee of the City Council. The Brunderburger president denied him of this position in 1920.

From 1921, Löwenstein was responsible for education in the City Council of Berlin – Neukölln. In this time he organised progressive school tuition fees, providing more school meals for children. He organised special preparation classes for graduation for working class children. Together with Fritz Karsen they founded the Karl-Marx School, the first non-religious school in Berlin.

From 1922 to 1934, Löwenstein was Vice-president and one of the co-founders of the Socialist Educational International (now the IFM-SEI).

From 1922 to 1934, he was the president of the International Falcon Movement-Socialist Educational International. From 1924 to 1933 he was the president of German Children's friend movement (ReichsArbeitsGemeinschaft der Kinderfreunde), now the Socialist Youth of Germany – Falcons. In 1933, when the organisation was forbidden, it united 130,000 children, 10,000 guides and 60,000 parents.
