= Woodcraft Folk =

UK-based youth organisation

- Founded: 1925
- Founder: Leslie Paul
- Type: Charity in England and Wales (1148195) in Scotland (SC039791) and Company Limited by Guarantee (08133727)
- Purpose: Environmentalism, Internationalism, Children's Rights, Cooperation and Peace
- Headquarters: Holyoake House, Hanover Street, Manchester, M60 0AS
- Origins: Kindred of the Kibbo Kift, Scouting and the cooperative movement
- Region served: Great Britain
- Method: Popular education and Scouting
- Members: c. 25,000
- General Secretary: Lloyd Russell-Moyle (General Secretary and CEO)
- Chairs: Eddie Moriarty and Joe Bailey
- Affiliations: IFM–SEI, Co-operatives UK, GFTU
- Website: www.woodcraft.org.uk

Woodcraft Folk is a UK-based educational movement for children and young people. Founded in 1925 and grown by volunteers, it has been a registered charity since 1965 and a registered company limited by guarantee since 2012. The constitutional object of this youth organisation is "to educate and empower young people to be able to participate actively in society, improving their lives and others' through active citizenship."

Woodcraft Folk was founded by Leslie Paul in 1925. It originated from the Kindred of the Kibbo Kift, an organisation led by ex-Scout Commissioner John Hargrave, who aimed to move away from the militaristic approach of the Scouts at that time. In its early days, Woodcraft Folk had strong pagan and anti-capitalist emphasis, but it gradually developed its own distinct ethos. The organisation was closely tied to the co-operative, labour, pacifist, early feminist, and trade union movements during the 1920s and 1930s.

The Woodcraft Folk's philosophy is centred around issues of social justice, pacifism, and cooperative values. They believe all members have an equal say in the decision-making process, regardless of social background, status, age, gender, or sexual orientation. The organisation is co-educational and welcomes young people of all religious backgrounds or none and places importance on international understanding and solidarity.

== History ==
The name "Woodcraft" was used by writer and naturalist Ernest Thompson Seton at the start of the 20th century when setting up the American proto-Scouting organisation Woodcraft Indians, and in this context meant the skill of living in the open air, close to nature. Seton later influenced Robert Baden-Powell and became chief scout of the US.

John Hargrave admired Seton's work and aimed to revert to it and away from Baden-Powell's influence in founding the Kindred of the Kibbo Kift. Another pro-Seton breakaway Scout group was the Order of Woodcraft Chivalry, founded slightly earlier in 1916.

Whilst sharing many of the same historical roots as the Scouting movement, Woodcraft Folk's direct antecedent was the Kindred of the Kibbo Kift, an organisation led by ex-Scout Commissioner for Woodcraft and Camping John Hargrave, who had broken with what he considered to be the Scouts' militaristic approach in the years immediately after the First World War. Woodcraft Folk was established by Leslie Paul in 1925 after the south London co-operative groups challenged Hargrave's authoritarian tendencies over his refusal to recognise a local group called "The Brockley Thing" and broke away from the Kindred.

In its early days it was very similar to the Kibbo Kift, with a strong pagan and anti-capitalist emphasis, but gradually developed its own distinct ethos. In the 1920s and 1930s it had close ties to the Co-operative Societies and to the labour, pacifist, early feminist and trade union movements, which provided a base for recruiting both adults and children and a practical focus which avoided it sharing the fates of the Kibbo Kift and Order of Woodcraft Chivalry, which both became increasingly eccentric and esoteric and were both moribund by the 1950s.

The Woodcraft Folk remained mainly based in working-class districts of industrial towns and cities, notably London, Coventry, and Sheffield, and with strong connections to the Co-operative Societies until the 1960s when it began to acquire a larger middle-class membership. During the 1970s to 1990s there was a large increase in new "districts" (local branches) being founded in suburbs and small towns, some of which were short-lived.

Recruitment of new members slowed in the 1990s, apparently due to Scout and Cub groups admitting girls, which removed the Woodcraft Folk's former appeal as the only organisation of its kind welcoming children of both sexes.

In the 1990s there was considerable debate within the movement, including over whether to keep or abandon the "Folk Shirt" (a green overshirt worn with badges) and over the role of camping and other outdoor activities. The Woodcraft Folk had traditionally attached great importance to outdoor activities and to urban children having access to the natural world, but camping has had a more peripheral role in recent years.

Woodcraft Folk logo used in the late 1980s to early 2000s and between 2008 and 2010

75th Anniversary logo used between 2000 and 2008

50th Anniversary logo used in 1975

In 2000 Woodcraft Folk developed a birthday logo. There was much argument about which logo should be used on official publications, with the new square logo favoured for a long time by the Head Office. In 2008 Annual Conference Woodcraft Folk voted to stop using the 75th logo and resort only to the round logo on official publications.

The history within the labour movement can be seen in the book produced by Woodcraft Folk called Fashioning a New World which it commissioned for its 75th birthday. Other historical references exist, including Cooperative Banners, a book available from the Rochdale Pioneers Museum which includes Woodcraft Folk banners. Woodcraft Folk historical records are held at University College London. Much of these archives can be viewed online including resources on how to use them for young people's groups.

Notable former Woodcraft Folk include the MPs Jeremy Corbyn and Lloyd Russell-Moyle (the latter of whom went on to become the organisation's chief executive), singer Sophie Ellis-Bextor, author and broadcaster Michael Rosen, and journalist Robert Peston.

== Philosophy ==
The Woodcraft Folk has always been "committed to issues of social justice, pacifism and the principles of cooperation" and described itself in 1930 as a "powerful educational instrument". They use the slogans "Span the World with Friendship" and "Education for Social Change", the latter particularly in its publicity and also constitutional documents.

Woodcraft Folk is not based upon any particular religious belief or national identity. The core values are that irrespective of social background, status, age, gender, sexual orientation etc. all members have an equal say in the decision-making process. The organisation welcomes all young people whether they have a religious background or none and much of its work emphasises the importance of international understanding and friendship. The principles of peace and co-operation are therefore central to everything they do and they endeavour to develop members to have an understanding of some of the issues behind global poverty and conflict in the belief in fashioning a new, better world.

The organisation lists its educational aims and principles as:

- Education for Social Change
- Co-operation
- International friendship
- Equality inclusion and religion
- Environmentalism
- Peace
- Politics and affirmation

== The Creed ==
The Creed, or envoy, is a statement that reflects the principles and values of Woodcraft Folk. It emphasises peace, kinship with all living things, the rejection of war, sloth, and greed, and the love of fellowship. Members pledge to work towards a new, better world through their actions and beliefs. It is traditionally said at the beginning of any group night or formal meeting, or sometimes sung. It is also known as the envoi. The tradition is that, when said, each person raises their right hand with their palm facing upwards, representing coming to the group with no weapons, and says in unison:

This shall be for a bond between us,
That we are of one blood you and I;
That we shall cry peace to all,
And claim kinship with every living thing;
That we hate War, Sloth and Greed,
And love fellowship.
And that we shall go singing to the fashioning of a new world.
PEACE

There is an alternative to this, usually recited in younger groups such as Elfins (6–9). The words to this are as follows:

We will do our best to be healthy and happy,
To care for the world and everything in it.
We will work with our friends in Woodcraft Folk
To build a fair and peaceful world for everyone.
PEACE.

At the end of camps it is tradition to link hands and sing the closing song (which is an old Rote Falken song):

Link your hands together
A circle we make;
This bond of our friendship
No power can break.
Let's all sing together
In one merry throng;
Should any be weary
We'll help them along;
Should any be weary
We'll help them along.

Let us then laugh lightly
If sadness should fall,
May joyous laughter
Spring from us all,
Helping each other
We'll lighten the load,
Arms linked with comrades
We travel the road.

Let us march together
With firm step and strong,
As out from the darkness
We all go along,
All sorrow is banished
We march to the light,
Link your hands together,
We're strong in our might.
PEACE

Until relatively recently the creed ended with a cry of 'How' rather than 'Peace'. This has been changed because the pseudo-Native American origin (with the patronising attitude implicit in its use) of the word 'How' does not match Woodcraft's policy of respect for other cultures. Members generally count in songs or the creed by shouting 'Ish, Ash, Osh' rather than counting. This is also of pseudo-Native American origin.

== Decision making ==
Woodcraft Folk is a democratic organisation. Policies are decided at annual conference (Annual Gathering), attended by delegates from groups and local districts. Between Annual Gathering responsibility for running the organisation falls on the members of the General Council. The organisation states that they "are proud of the fact that about half of our current General Council are young people under 25 years of age".

== Age groups ==
Woodcraft Folk groups operate in England, Scotland and Wales. In Wales the organisation is known as Gwerin y Coed. Groups generally meet weekly, their activities including co-operative games, drama and craftwork as well as following an educational programme based on the organisation's aims and principles. Group nights last between one and two hours, depending on the age of participants. Groups are usually divided by age, depending on the size of the group. Groups are either 'parent co-operatives' where parents come with their children to each session, leading occasionally, or have designated Kinsfolk leaders.

=== Woodchips ===
Under six is the most recently established age group in Woodcraft Folk. Previously, under-sixes were known unofficially by several different names, including Pixies, Wood Pigeons and Mini-Elfins.

=== Elfins ===
Six to nine years old.

=== Pioneers ===
Ten to twelve years old.

Pioneers traditionally began their sessions and camps with the Pioneer lore.

For these things shall I strive;
A keen eye;
A seeing hand;
A body that fails not;
An arm that is strong and willing to serve;
A mind that yearns to understand;
A spirit that searches for the truth and loves the silent places;
A heart that is courageous and bears goodwill to all men.

The last line was later seen by some as sexist and the ending was changed to "and bears goodwill to all". The Pioneer lore fell out of use in the 1980s due to the focus on health and physical strength being perceived as ableist and linking to Woodcrafts pseudo-eugenist background.

Woodcraft Folk established their first national Pioneer camp in 2024.

=== Venturers ===
Venturers are Woodcraft Folk members aged 13 to 15. The age group was established in 1963, when the existing Pioneer age range was divided into Pioneers, aged 10 to 12, and Venturers, aged 13 to 15.

The programme combines play, outdoor activities and creative work with political education, campaigning and social action, activism and social issues, with increasing independence in shaping their groups.. Building on activities undertaken in younger age groups, Venturers take greater responsibility for choosing and organising their programme and applying what they have learnt to issues in their communities. Adult volunteers support young people in developing their own activities and projects.

Venturers have an elected national committee, established in 2012, which represents the age group and contributes to organising activities and camps.

==== Venturer Camp ====
The first national Venturer Camp was held at Wortley Hall, South Yorkshire, in 1973. Camps are generally held every three years, although the interval has varied when other camps have been planned. Each has an overarching theme, with a programme combining outdoor activities, creative workshops, political discussion and communal entertainment. International delegations are a common feature of these camps, usually from International Falcon Movement – Socialist Educational International (IFM-SEI).

Older young members, including District Fellows (DFs), help organise the camps and deliver activities for their younger peers. Young people organising workshop, meals and other aspects of camp life, alongside activities addressing subjects such as climate action.

National Venturer Camps
Year	Location	Theme or notes
2026	Biblins Youth Campsite, Forest of Dean, Herefordshire	Storytelling
2023	Biblins Youth Campsite, Forest of Dean, Herefordshire	Mythology
2019	Biblins Youth Campsite, Forest of Dean, Herefordshire	Voyages
2016	Biblins Youth Campsite, Forest of Dean, Herefordshire	Woodcraft Folk Through Time
2013	Drum Hill Scout Camp, Little Eaton, Derbyshire	A Midsummer Night's Dream
2010	Drum Hill Scout Camp, Little Eaton, Derbyshire	Futures, fashioning a new world
2008	Drum Hill Scout Camp, Little Eaton, Derbyshire	Anti-Apathy
2005	Drum Hill Scout Camp, Little Eaton, Derbyshire	Peace / Hiroshima Remembrance
2002	Woodcraft Park Farm, Lurgashall, West Sussex	Sustainability / Friendship
1999	Keswick, Lake District	
1996	Blakthron Farm, Coleford, Forest of Dean	
1993	Rother Valley Country Park, Rotherham	A world to live and survive in
1990		
1985	Tynlwyfan Farm, Llanfairfechan, Gwynedd	Towards a Brighter Future
1981	Tynlwyfan Farm, Llanfairfechan, Gwynedd	Emphasis on outdoor activities
1977	Bangor, Gwynedd	International friendship
1973	Wortley Hall, South Yorkshire	

Local and regional activities take place between national camps. These include London Region's midnight ice skating events for Venturers and DFs at Alexandra Palace.

=== District Fellows ===
Sixteen to twenty-year-olds are organised in a section called the District Fellows movement. They were established in 1977.

The District Fellows Movement (DFs) operates both on a local group level and as a semi-autonomous movement within Woodcraft Folk. The age group is largely run by DFs through the DF Committee, which was established in 1984. DF committee elections occur every August at their AGM, Althing. Votes and nominations can be cast both in person at the event or online. Alternative vote is used for the majority of roles, although Single Transferable Vote is used for roles with multiple positions.

DF committee is made up of the following primary roles:

- Activism Representative
- Chair of Committee
- Communications Representative
- Events Representative
- Fundraising Representative
- Lay Member 1
- Lay Member 2
- MEST-UP Coordinator
- Outreach Representative
- Safeguarding Representative
- Secretary of the Movement
- Shadow Events Representative
- Shadow MEST-UP Coordinator
- Shadow Treasurer
- Training and First Aid Representative
- Treasurer

There are also secondary roles that are often held concurrently by committee members.

- Vice Chair of DF Committee
- Chair Carer
- Resource Fairy
- General Council Representative (Odd)
- General Council Representative (Even)

DF committee organises four annual events, Autumn Nocturne, Winter Wonderland, Spring Awakening and DF Camp– and three regional, open committee meetings called Things. Previous events have celebrated music and fancy dress – such as "Span That World With Costume" and "Span That World with Music" – and members have met at regional events including beach bivvying and Valentines hostel weekends.

DFs have their own website, "Span That World". From 2025, DFs have been able to access the movements zine from the website, as well as in person from the Zine Fairy on events. They also run their own campaigns, led by DF Committees Activism Representative. The last campaign was on Workers' Rights and Trade Unions. In 2025, the movement (independently from central Woodcraft) called on Secretary of state for Justice, David Lammy, to take action against the unfair imprisonment and treatment of the Filton 24, a group of imprisoned Palestine Action prisoners on hunger strike.

=== Kinsfolk ===
Those aged 21 and over. They take on the majority of leadership roles at local and national level. Some distinction is made between 'young Kinsfolk' and the rest of the age group due to its broad scope. This is shown by General Council having reserved places for trustees under 25 on its board.

== Funding ==
Woodcraft Folk is paid for by weekly subscription from children and young people, adult memberships paid yearly and groups pay annual national registration fees. Woodcraft Folk has also from its start received substantial support from the co-operative movement and is part of Co-operatives UK.

Woodcraft Folk used to receive a yearly subsidy from the Department for Education and Skills. In 2005, however, Woodcraft Folk lost this grant. The department said that the organisation's claim for a grant lacked detail and that they did not have "sufficiently robust outcome indicators", meaning that it did not represent a "good value for money", although some members of Woodcraft Folk have claimed that the real reason the funding was stopped is the group's strong stance against the Iraq War. This was the first time in forty years the organisation was denied funding by the department. The grant money provided a fifth of the funds that helped to pay for Woodcraft Folk's full-time staff and headquarters.

Woodcraft Folk campaigned to get its funding back and before the May 2005 election was offered a seconded employee from the Department for Education and Skills starting in 2006 for a year and a return to limited funding the year after.

Woodcraft Folk also receives sporadic funding from grant providers for project work it undertakes such as the London Training grant from the City Bridge Trust. Other recent grants include those for Global Village 2006 from the Department for International Development and The Co-operative Group and for the 18-month Climate Challenge project, C-Change, from the Department for Environment, Food and Rural Affairs.

== Affiliations ==
=== International ===
Although a British organisation, it has sister organisations throughout the world, by being a part of the Brussels-based federation of progressive youth organisations, the International Falcon Movement – Socialist Education International (IFM-SEI).

The IFM-SEI links together like-minded progressive youth organisations in many parts of the world, though its strongest affiliates are in Western Europe and Latin America. It has a secretariat based in Brussels. Carly Walker-Dawson, a former Woodcraft Folk vice-chair is the (elected) secretary general. Woodcraft Folk's former general secretary Andy Piercy sat on the Control Commission of IFM-SEI until 2007.

International camps where similar organisations can meet up and network are held every year in different countries. International camps take place in England every four years or so.

=== Voluntary sector ===
Woodcraft Folk is affiliated to NCVO, National Council for Voluntary Organisations, and to the Scottish Council for Voluntary Organisations.

In the development education field, Woodcraft is an affiliate of the Development Education Association.

=== Youth service ===
The main youth 'quango' is the NYA, National Youth Agency, to which Woodcraft works closely. Woodcraft Folk plays an active part in the voluntary youth service, mainly through the NCVYS (pronounced nik-vis), the National Council for Voluntary Youth Service, which also includes groups such as The Scout Association and Girlguiding UK.

Woodcraft Folk is affiliated to the British Youth Council, an umbrella body for youth councils and youth organisations across the UK.

=== Co-operative movement ===
Woodcraft Folk has since its founding had close links with the co-operative movement, and currently receives considerable financial support from various co-op bodies. Since their origin with the Rochdale Principles, co-operatives have recognised the need for an educational component to their work both to demonstrate their value as an alternative economic model to their members and also to promote the co-operative values more widely.

Co-operatives UK (formerly the Co-operative Union) is the federation of all co-operatives in the UK. Woodcraft Folk are members of Co-operatives UK and work closely with the Co-operative College.

=== Peace movement ===
Woodcraft Folk are members of the Stop the War Coalition and affiliated to the National Peace Council, the Campaign Against Arms Trade (CAAT) and work closely with many local CND branches.

=== Outdoor/environmental movements ===
Affiliations are held with the Ramblers Association (RA), and Woodcraft Folk have a close relationship with Youth Hostels Association (YHA) attending the AGM and other statutory meetings. Woodcraft Folk is affiliated to the Council for Environmental Education (CEE) and The Central Council of Physical Recreation (UK) (CCPR).

The Forest School Camps (FSC) organisation, which organises democratically run camps for children and young people, has very similar objectives to Woodcraft Folk with shared historical links which continue today.

=== Trade Unions ===
Woodcraft Folk became the first community affiliate of the General Federation of Trade Unions (GFTU) in February 2026, after a rule change agreed at the GFTU's General Council Meeting in 2025 now allowing national community organisations to apply for affiliation. Both organisations hoped it would increase membership and understanding of trade unions among young people.

== Residential Centres and Campsites ==
The Woodcraft Folk operates six residential centres and campsites around England:

Name	Location	Ownership
Biblins	Wye Valley	Long-term lease
Cudham	Kent	Woodcraft Folk
Darsham	Suffolk	Associate
Height Gate	Calderdale	Woodcraft Folk
Lockerbrook	Peak District	Woodcraft Folk
Scarletts Campsite	East Sussex	Woodcraft Folk

Wimbledon Woodcraft Folk which is a separate but affiliated organisation operates:

Name	Location	Ownership
Park Farm	West Sussex	Associate

== General Secretaries and Chairs ==
The Woodcraft folk has two leadership position: the General Secretary is the head of the staff and full time coordinator of the organisation, and the Chair of the General Council is the chair of the board.

The role of President was abolished in the early 2000s but was held by various people including Denis Goldberg.

The General Secretary of the organisation is the chief executive officer and has in the past been called the National Secretary or National Organiser.

Year	General Secretary
2025–present	Lloyd Russell-Moyle
2018–2025	Debs McCahon (2018-2020 joint with Sarah Welsh)
2010–2018	Jon Nott
2006–2009	Kirsty Palmer (Chris Pyke acting in 2009–2010)
1996–2006	Andy Piercy (Chris Pyke acting in 2005–6)
1990–1996	Tony Billinghurst
1983–1990	Doug Bourn
1954–1983	Marg White
1936–1954	Henry Fair

Chair of General Council was originally called Headman. They are the chair of the board of Trustees and Directors.

Year	Chair of General Council
September 2026 - Present	Eddie Moriarty (Co-chair) Joe Bailey (Co-chair)
September 2025 – September 2026	Eddie Moriarty
October 2024 – September 2025	Joe Bailey
November 2021 – October 2024	Aggie Taylor
October 2018 – November 2021	Pip Sayers
November 2016 – October 2018	Stuart Walker
2012 – November 2016	Pat Hunter
September 2009 – January 2012	Lloyd Russell-Moyle
July 2008 – September 2009	Danny Rowe
September 2006 – July 2008	Richard Lace
July 2004 – September 2006	Jess Cawley
July 2002 – July 2004	Tamsin Pearce
September 1996 – July 2002	Jess Cawley
1995–1996	Dot Ballentine
1992–1995	Adrienne Lowe
1991– 1992	Eleanor Beckman
1990– 1991	Jim Stewart
1989– 1990	Julie Thorpe
1984– 1989	Andy Piercy
1976– 1984 ??-1976	Tony Raine Teddy Hawkes
1934– 1941	Basil Rawson
1925– 1934	Leslie Paul

== Events ==
Woodcraft Folk organise both local and regional camps and activities as well as larger national camps such as a camp for Venturers (see above) held every three years and an International Camp, usually held every five to six years.

The Global Village Youth Festival of 2006 was the first in over 60 years to be held as an official IFM-SEI camp. Another international festival called CoCamp concentrated on cooperation in the world. CoCamp was an unofficial IFM-SEI camp with groups from all over the world participating in the event. Further international camps included Common Ground (2022) and Camp 100 (2025, Woodcraft Folk's centenary year), both held in the grounds of Kelmarsh Hall in Northamptonshire and attended by international delegations as well as by Woodcraft Folk groups from across the UK.

Regional events are aimed at supporting local communities and traditions and reminding its members of the importance of holding onto ideals of justice, democracy, peace and co-operation. The South West Woodcraft Folk for instance meet annually at Levellers Day and the Tolpuddle Martyrs festival.

== The Courier ==
The Courier was a seasonal members' magazine bringing news from inside Woodcraft Folk as well as worldwide news on events of interest to members of Woodcraft Folk.

== See also ==
- International Falcon Movement – Socialist Education International
- Woodcraft
- Woodcraft League of America
- Order of Woodcraft Chivalry
- Kibbo Kift
- Forest kindergarten
- Wandervogel
