= Rock art in Denmark =

Rock art

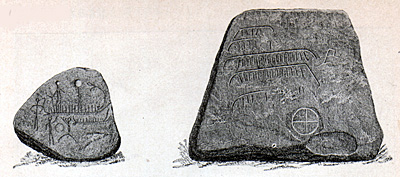
Rock carvings of Engelstrup and Herrestrup

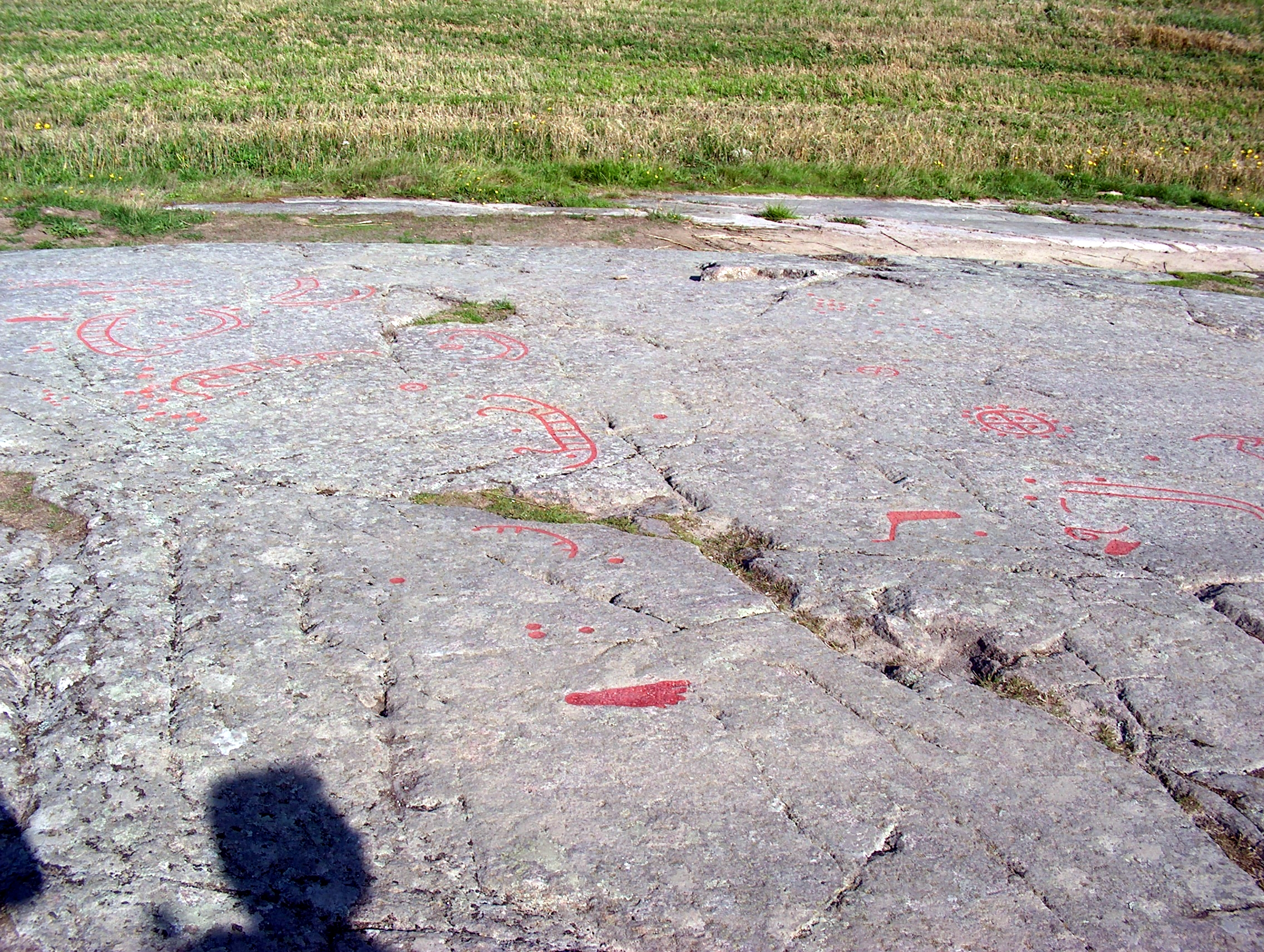
Madsebakke on Bornholm

Rock art in Denmark (Danish: Helleristninger or Halristinger) differs significantly from that of the Scandinavian Peninsula. Carvings are smaller, focused on agriculture (Danish: Jordbruksristninger), rarely figural. Some examples are engraved on megaliths or cists, but most on small glacial erratics. Many of these have been placed in museums or incorporated into churches (Asnæs near Kalundborg, Såby near Roskilde, Sigersted near Ringsted - all in Zealand - and Taps in Kolding). A few have been left in situ, like the two stones at Mandbjerghøj.

The repertoire of images of these carvings includes raised hands, Footprints (individuals and pairs), wheels, sun crosses, and spirals, as well as ships. In addition to these, there are also some abstract or unclear images. The majority of the images are associated with cup and ring marks.

== Bornholm ==
On Bornholm, which in prehistoric times belonged more to the Swedish cultural sphere, there are numerous large carvings on cliff faces - mostly of ships. Denmark's largest complex of rock art is at Madsebakke in Allinge-Gudhjem. There are also noteworthy petroglyphs at Blåholt, Lille Strandbygård, and Storløkkebakken.

== Bibliography ==
- Peter Vilhelm Glob: Helleristninger i Danmark (= Jysk Arkæologisk Selskabs skrifter. Vol. 7, ISSN 0107-2854). Jysk Arkæologisk Selskab, Højbjerg 1969.

== See also ==
- Rock art in Sweden
