= Mandbjerghøj =

Archaeological site in Denmark

Coordinates: 56°26′18.24″N 9°51′36.93″E

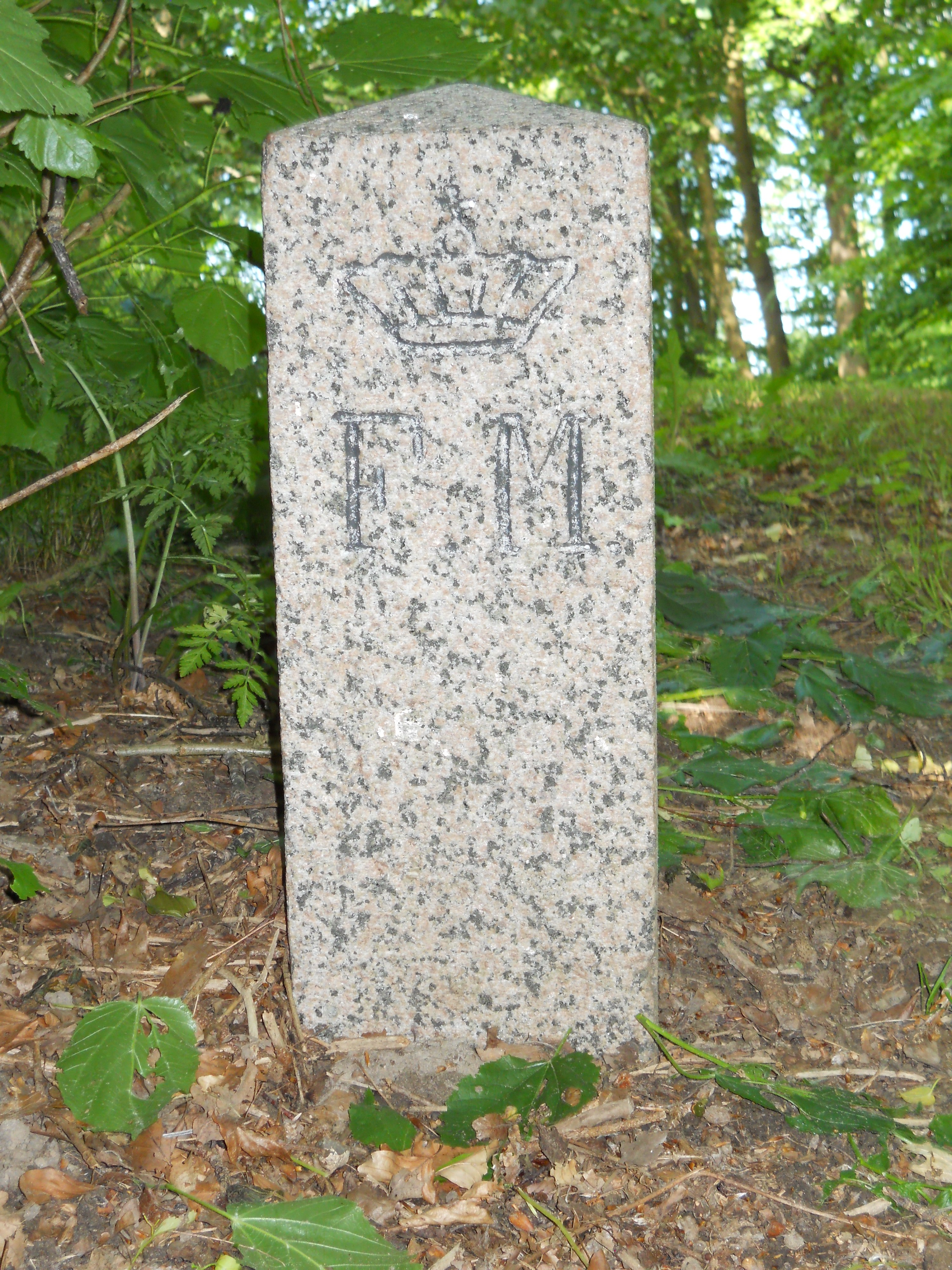
Heritage marker

The Mandbjerghøj is located next to the road through Øster Velling Skov forest, north of Øster Velling, west of Randers in Jutland, Denmark. Here there are two small granite boulders with engraved geometric patterns from the Bronze Age. A granite Fredningssten (heritage marker stone) marks the spot.

The two stones with petroglyphs stand some fifty metres from their original find spot. There are also the almost completely destroyed remains of the Mandbjerghøj tumulus where the first stone with petroglyphs, which was part of the tumulus fence, was found in 1857.

In 1880, the owner of the property razed the hill in order to fill a marl pit with its earth. While he was carrying out this work, he encountered a stone cist and after he contacted the museum, Mandbjerghøj as excavated. During these excavations, the two stones were found which now stand by the street. In the same year, another stone with petroglyphs was discovered, which was taken to the National Museum and is now part of the Bronze Age display in the Cultural History Museum in Randers.

The tumulus which is now barely visible was originally about 24 m in diameter and four metres high. In the middle of the mound was a typical male grave of the early Bronze Age (c. 1500 BC). In the grave a bronze sword and a gilt belt-hook were found, which bore the same motif as the rock carvings, thereby demonstrating that the tumulus and the carvings were made at the same date.

The three rocks with petroglyphs were originally part of the stone fencing of the mound. The carvings were probably originally marked out with coloured paint, since they retain traces of paint, like the carvings on runestones. Without the paint, the images are almost unrecognisable. The stones depict concentric rings and three ovals, which themselves enclose two rings. The meaning and purpose of these carvings is unknown.

== See also ==
- Rock art in Denmark

== Bibliography ==
- Glob, Peter Vilhelm (1969). Helleristninger i Danmark. Jysk Arkæologisk Selskabs skrifter (in Danish). Vol. 7. Højbjerg: Jysk Arkæologisk Selskab.
