= Massleberg 1 rock art =

Coordinates: 58°57′33.1″N 11°19′8.4″E

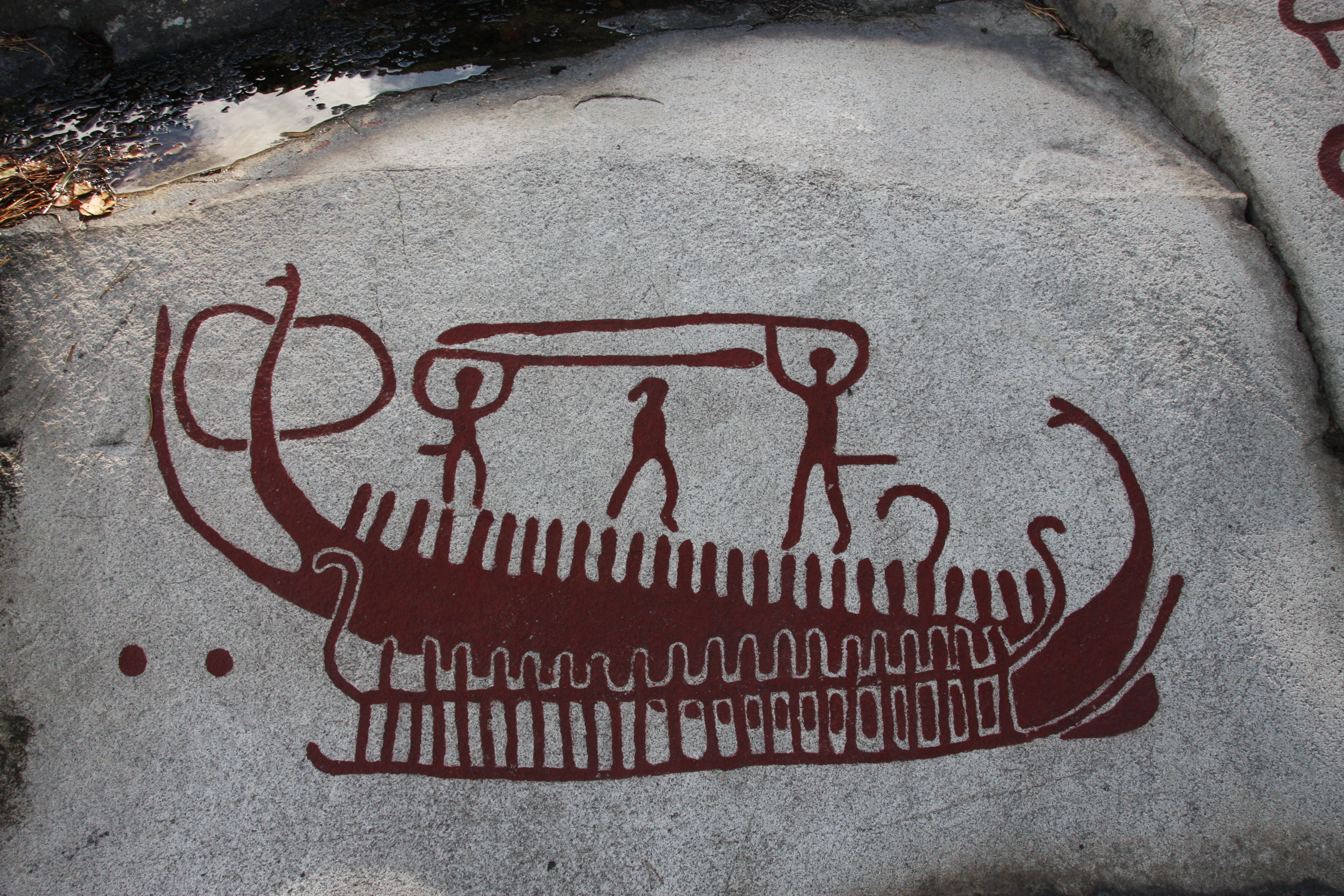
One of the Massleberg 1 rock carvings

The Massleberg 1 rock art (RAÄ-Number: Skee 614:1) are located near Strömstad in Bohuslän, in south-western Sweden, some 80 metres from the Massleberg grave field. On a rock face, several partially overlapping carvings from the Bronze Age can be seen.

Surrounded by numerous cup marks, the carvings depict Ithyphallic men, some bearing or raising axes, spears, and shields; Footprints; a lattice pattern; a sun cross; small and large ships; animals (deer and dogs), as well as various other images. Small strokes in the rowing ship symbolise the crew members. The "hook" on the ship image indicates a Lur.

The unusual image of a man carrying a ship is almost exactly the same as the depiction of shipbearer on another rock face in Bohuslän. It might therefore depict an early Nordic myth.

== See also ==
- Rock art in Sweden

== Bibliography ==
- Mårten Stenberger: Vorgeschichte Schwedens (= Nordische Vorzeit. Vol. 4). Wachholtz, Neumünster 1977, ISBN 3-529-01805-8.
