= Rock Carvings of Boglösa =

Coordinates: 59°35′49″N 17°10′38″E

The Rock carvings of Boglösa in the province of Uppland in central Sweden are located to the southeast of Enköping. The three petroglyphs (Swedish: Hällristningar) form part of a complex of rock art. They derive from the Swedish Bronze Age (c.1500-500 BC) and the Iron Age. They are:

- Boglösa Kyrka, near the church;
- Brandskogen, 900 m west of Boglösa Kyrka
- Rickeby, near the church

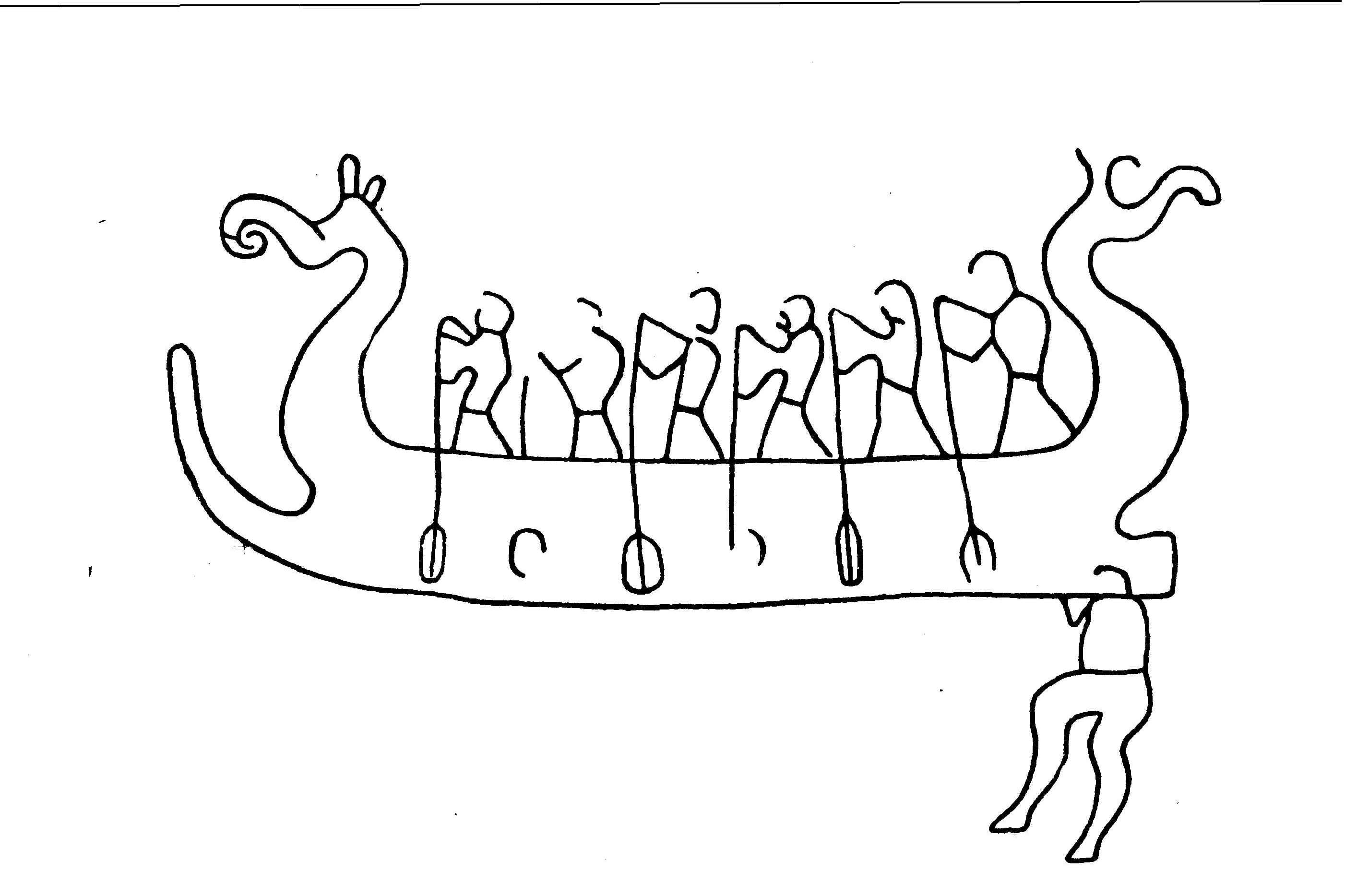
Line drawing of the Brandskogsskeppet

== Boglösa Kyrka and Rickeby ==
These two Bronze Age rock art complexes consist of abstract depictions of people, animals and symbols. Alongside them are Footprints, circles, wheels, rings, ships, spirals, and unclear images, as well as interactions between the groups of depictions. Thus they are largely in line with other Bronze Age rock carvings in the southern half of Sweden.

== Brandskogen ==
Among the Hällristningar, which depict ships, the 4.13 m long and 0.6 m high Brandskogsskeppet (Brandskogen Ship) stands out. The unparalleled, naturalistically depicted, compact hull is decorated at the ends with the heads of moose. The crew consists of six rowers. This image is dated to the beginning of the Iron Age.

The Brandskogskeppet apparently depicts a small vessel as an offering to the gods. The donor is perhaps the person depicted below the ship, apparently carrying it. The Archaeological Institute of the University of Uppsala considers that the depiction "must stand in relation to religious ritual or have been seen as holy." In this way, the image can be connected to real ship offerings, like the Nydam Ship. That ships had already reached a significant size in the Bronze Age is shown by a second rock carving at Brandskogen. This stylised (and therefore older) image shows a ship with a crew of 79.

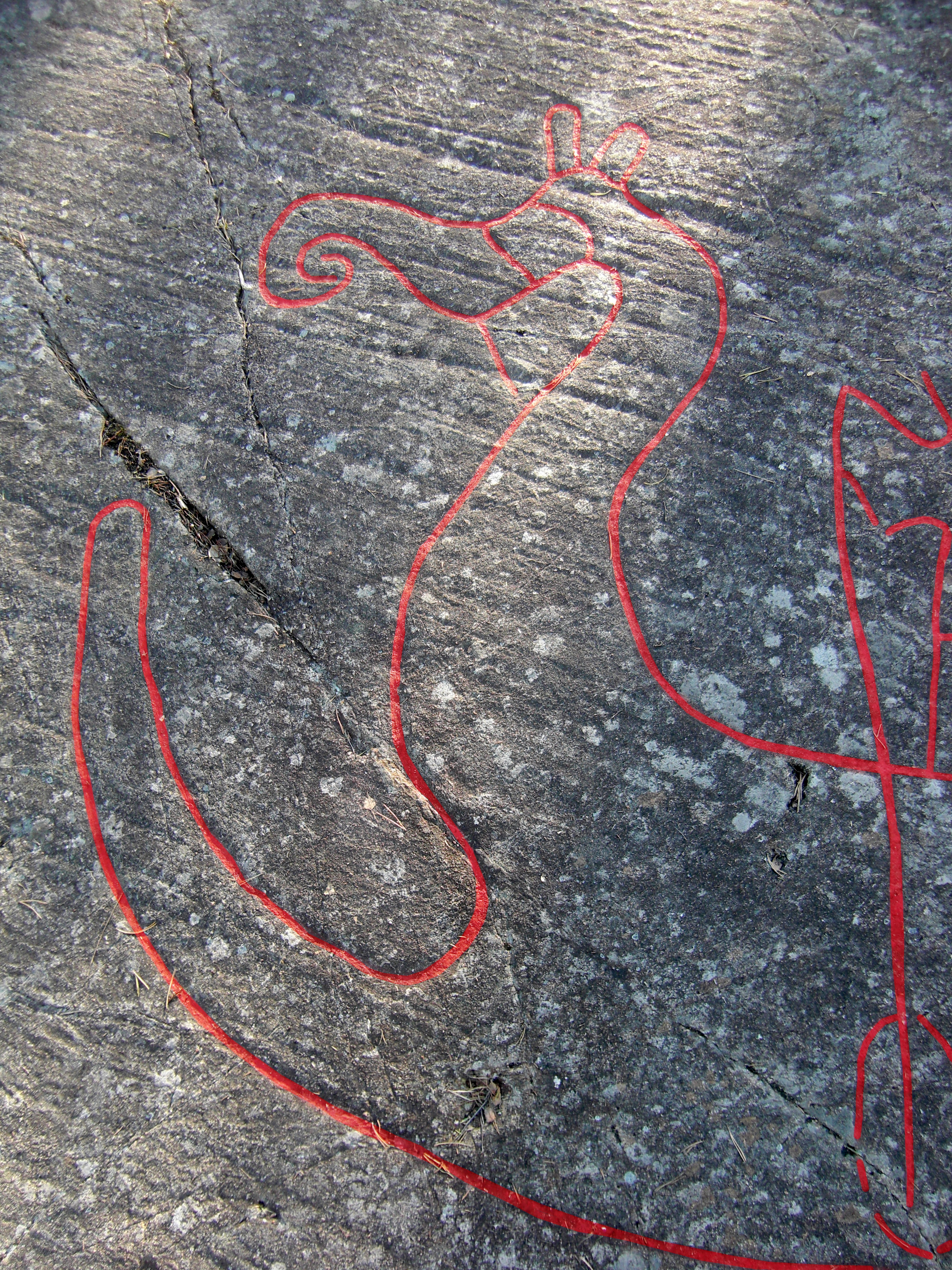
Brandskogsskeppet: Detail of the prow

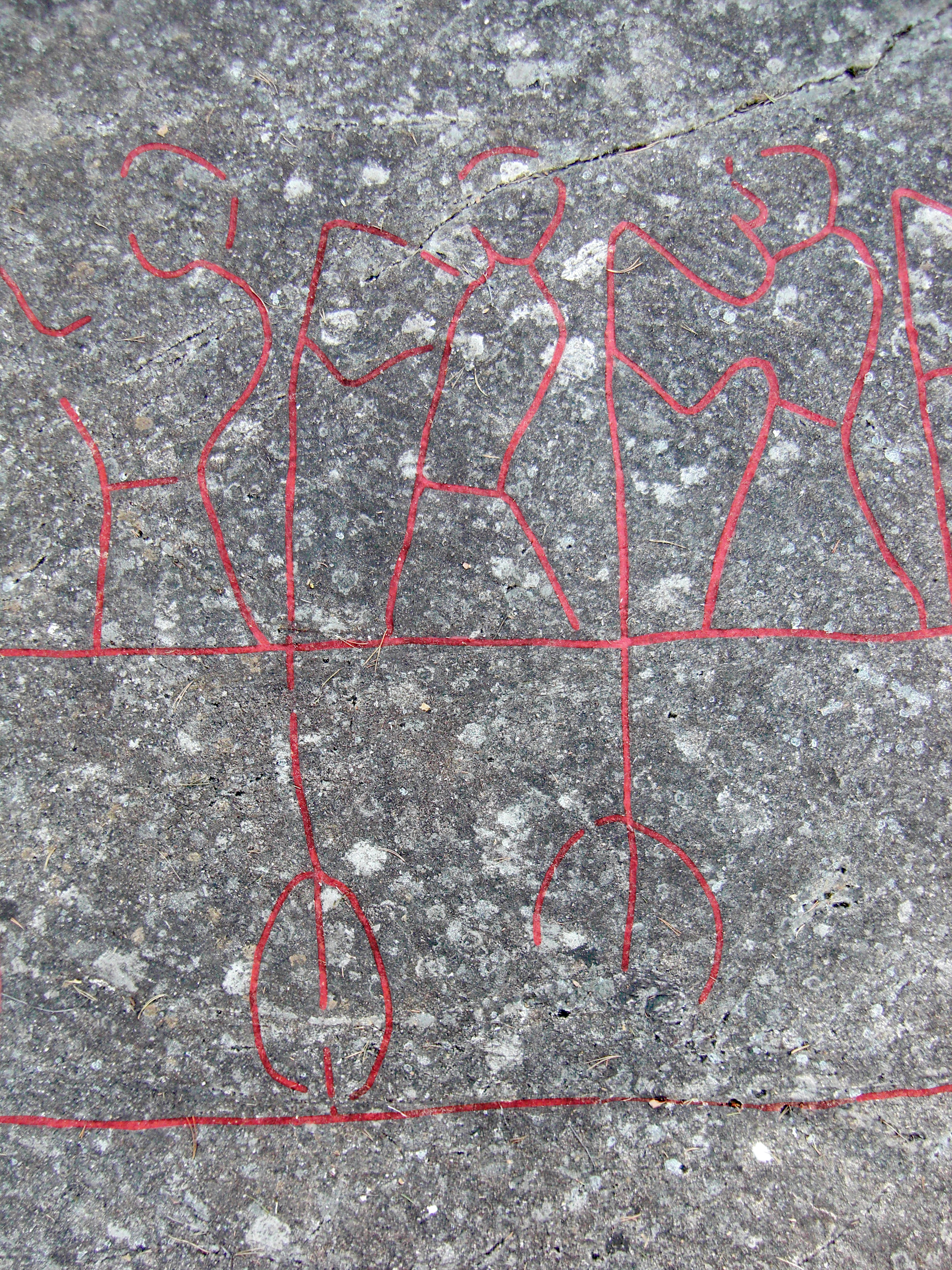
Men at the rudder

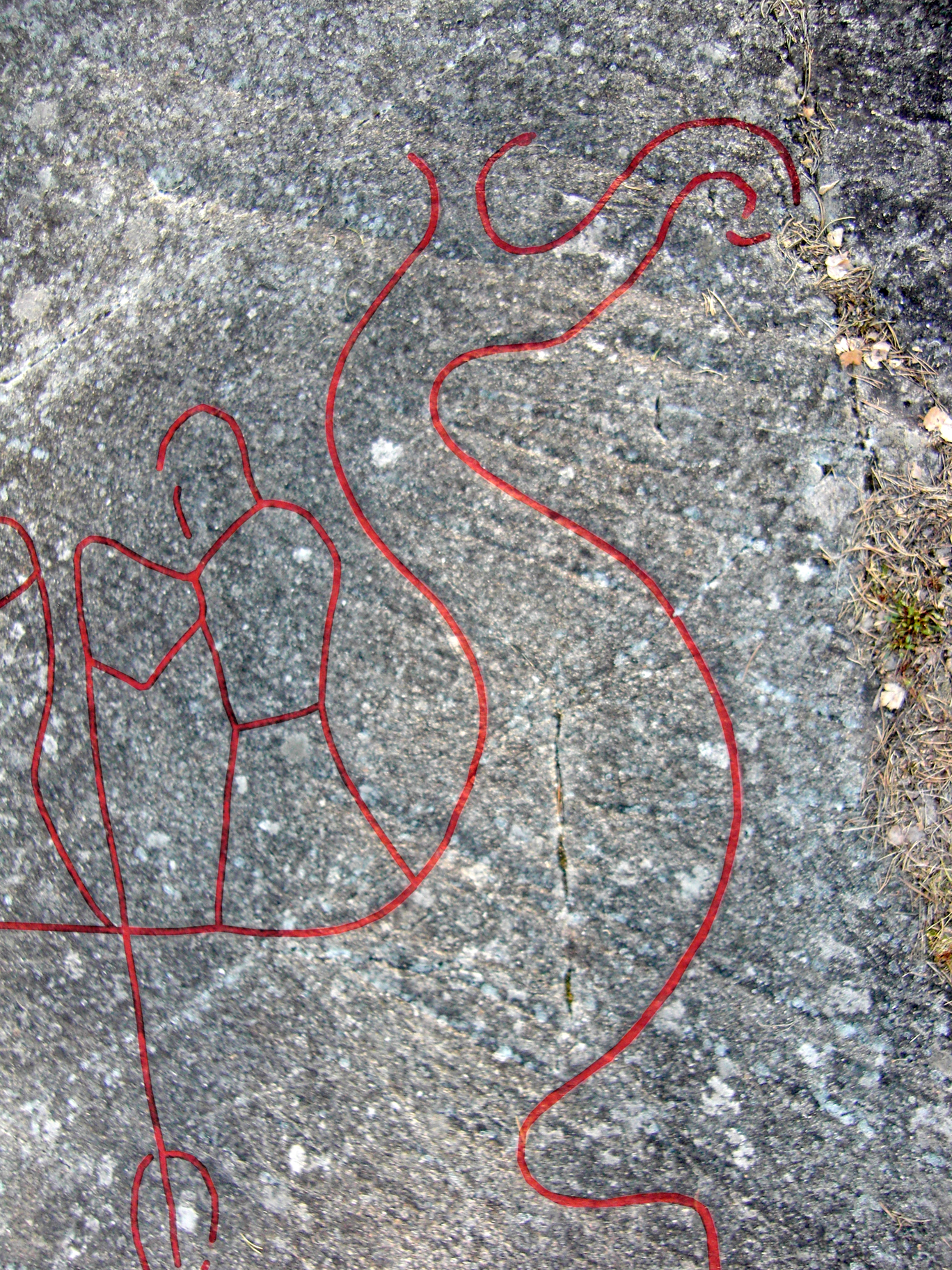
Detail of the stern

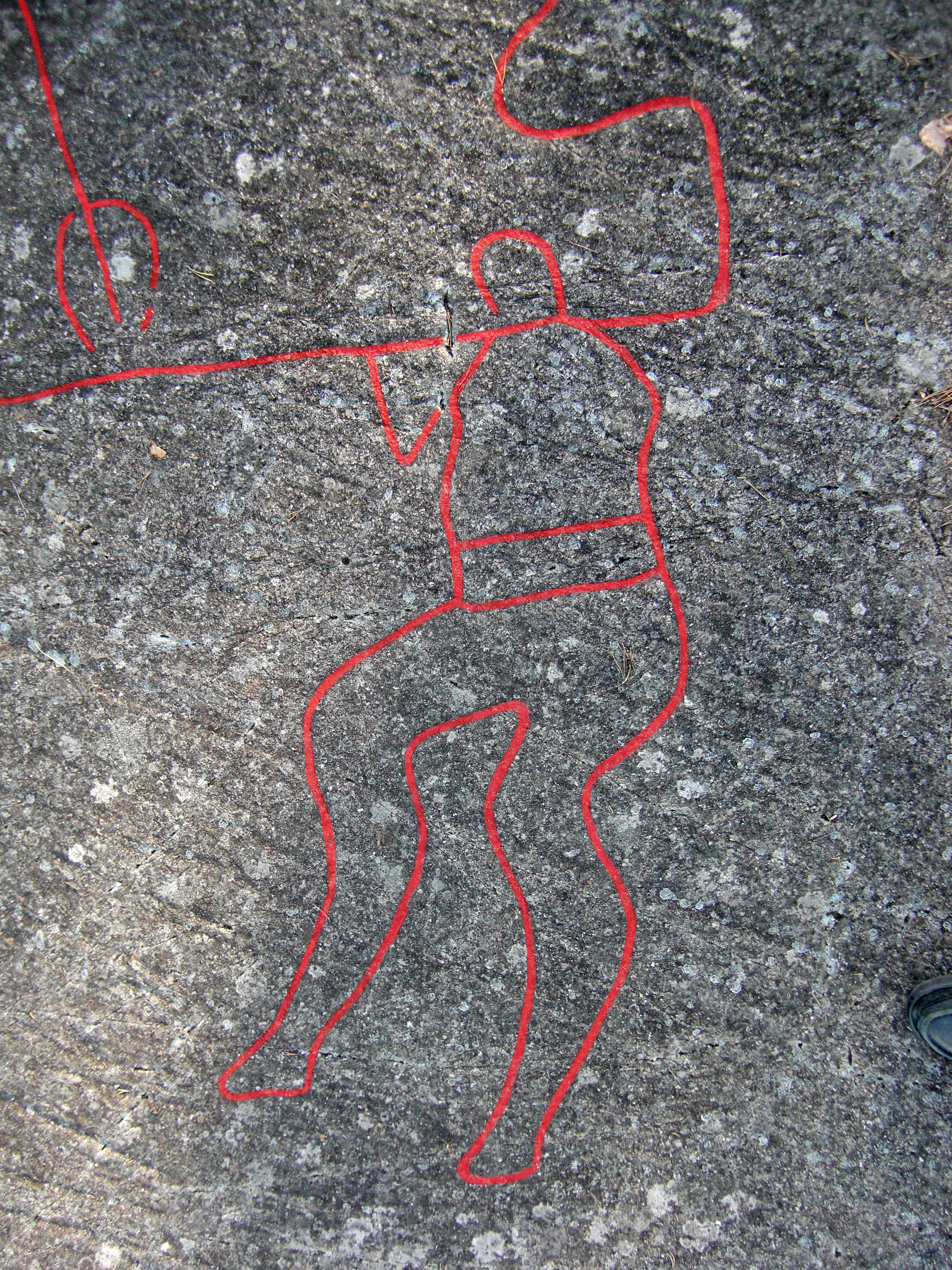
Man carrying the ship

== See also ==
- Rock art in Sweden

== Bibliography ==
- Bertil Almgren: Lebendige Vorzeit. Felsbilder der Bronzezeit aus Schweden. Special Issue. Joint-Publication of the Archaeological Institute of the University of Uppsala and the State Museum for Nature and Man, Oldenburg, 1980.
- Einar Kjellén, Åke Hyenstrand: Hällristningar och bronsålderssamhälle i sydvästra Uppland (= Upplands fornminnesförenings tidskrift. Vol. 49, ISSN 0347-9714). Upplands fornminnesförening, Uppsala 1977.
