= Leslie Paul =

Anglo-Irish writer & co-founder of the Woodcraft Folk

- Born: Leslie Allen Paul; 30 April 1905; Dublin, United Kingdom of Great Britain and Ireland
- Died: 8 July 1985 (aged 80); Cheltenham, United Kingdom
- Era: 20th century
- Organization: The Woodcraft Folk
- Title: Headman
- Term: 1925-1934
- Successor: Basil Rawson
- Movement: Scouting
- Parents: Frederick Paul (father); Lottie Burton (mother)
- Awards: Atlantic Award
- Military service
- Allegiance: Allies
- Branch: British Army
- National Service: 1941-1945
- Corps: RAEC
- Theatre: Middle East

Religious life
- Religion: Christianity
- Denomination: Anglican
- Church: Church of England

Leslie Allen Paul (1905, Dublin – 1985, Cheltenham) was an Anglo-Irish writer and co-founder of the Woodcraft Folk.

== Life ==
=== Early life ===
Born in Dublin on 30 April 1905, Leslie Paul grew up in Honor Oak, southeast London, the second child of advertising manager Frederick Paul and registered nurse, Lottie Burton. The family was fairly large, consisting of three sons and two daughters including younger siblings Joan and Douglas.

During his materially poor but culturally rich childhood, Paul contributed dramatic poetry recitations to family/neighbourhood entertainments. He later recalled performing a vignette called Two Coons, which gave a sympathetic representation of African culture.

=== Young manhood: between the wars ===
In 1923 he joined his father's firm Pantlin and Paul in Fleet Street, hoping to find a way into freelance journalism. He actually succeeded in becoming editor of a magazine called The open Road, but the magazine failed after only six months. During that six months Paul attempted to become a freelance journalist, and wrote the unpublished The Journal of a Sun Worshipper. During this period Paul came under the mentorship of Charles Watson, a retired unionist, bookseller and Swedenborgian. Watson loaned Paul books from his bookshop which were to have a major influence on Paul's political and social thinking. Another influence was Harold Laski, whose powers of oratory influenced Paul's thinking and writing style.

During the 1930s Paul worked as a freelance journalist. He was also employed in London educational and social work, as well as working on the continent with refugees. He was a tutor with the London County Council as well as the Workers' Educational Association.

In 1932 Paul published his strongly autobiographical first novel Fugitive Morning.

Paul's political views at this time were inspired by H. G. Wells, William Morris, and Edward Carpenter, while his ideas about children's education were partly drawn from Rousseau's Emile. In addition, Paul was also active in the pacifist No More War Movement. In the 1930s, Paul co-edited the journal of the Federation of Progressive Societies and Individuals, later known as The Progressive League, of which he was a leading member. Later, Paul was an outspoken critic of the Axis powers, as well as the Soviet Union, of which he had formerly been an enthusiast, following the latter nation's signing of the Molotov–Ribbentrop Pact. After the outbreak of World War Two and the rise of fascism, Paul abandoned his pacifism and supported the British war effort.

=== Creation of the Woodcraft Folk (1925) ===
After World War I Paul had become deeply involved with scouting and related youth movements. He left The Scouts to join The Kindred of the Kibbo Kift but after a dispute with the Kibbo Kift leader, John Hargrave in 1924, some members challenged Hargrave's authoritarian tendencies. Paul was one of 32 signatories of a June 1924 leaflet produced to support a motion ‘That the administration of Kibbo Kift during recent months has been profoundly unsatisfactory’. At the annual Kibbo Kift camp in 1924, a vote of no confidence was proposed in Hargrave, but its proposers lost; Paul and other members broke away. Paul, with Sydney Shaw, co-founded a new group, the Woodcraft Folk in 1925 (which is still active).

Although the founding and development of early Woodcraft Folk was the work of several people, Paul— its most eloquent member and its first leader— has been mythologised as its sole founder. Paul served as the organisation's Headman until 1934, when he was succeeded by Basil Rawson.

=== World War II ===
During the Second World War Paul served in the Middle East with the Royal Army Educational Corps, and also taught at Mount Carmel College. When Simone Weil died in Ashford, Kent, in August 1943 Paul paid £12 for a burial plot. This event is commemorated in his poem 'Lady Whose Grave I Own'.

The war prompted Paul to return to his childhood Christian faith. He claimed that Christianity was of major cultural and spiritual importance to reconstruction in his book The Annihilation of Man (1944), which received the Atlantic Award for literature in 1946. It had been nominated for the award by T. S. Eliot.

After the Second World War Paul became an active member of the Church of England. He rejected The Woodcraft Folk, and wrote critically of their shortcomings in his 1951 autobiography, Angry Young Man, although he would later be reconciled with the organisation in the 1970s. Paul continued to write on youth subjects, co-authoring the Ministry of Education's Abermarle Report on youth services provision in 1960 with Richard Hoggart and Pearl Jephcott. Later, Paul became a professional clergyman. His most significant act within the Church was the production of his report on "The deployment and payment of the clergy" (1964), which led to extensive modernisation of the Church's organisational structure.

He was employed as tutor at the College of Citizenship (1947–8), and later as Director of Studies at Brasted Place Theological College (1953–7). Paul served as lecturer in ethics and social studies at Queen's College (1965–70), and on the General Synod (1970–1975).

=== Later years ===
During the first half of the 1980s Paul was writer in residence at the College of St Paul and St Mary in Cheltenham, occupying a basement flat (accompanied by a black and white cat) in Shurdington Road. During this time he mentored young college and local writers through organised group readings, and co-edited the college poetry magazine, Cresset, to which he contributed his poetry, including Meditations on the Four Quartets.

In 1984 Paul bequeathed or sold his personal library, and students Kim Lidstone and Angus Whitehead catalogued the library before it was moved. One memorable discovery was a paperback edition of Richard von Krafft-Ebing's Psychopathia Sexualis.

According to the Oxford Dictionary of National Biography, Paul spent his later years living in Madley, Herefordshire. He died in Cheltenham General Hospital on 8 July 1985, after a heart attack.

== Influences ==
During the first half of the 1980s Paul gave a series of talks on his life and the books that had affected him most profoundly. These included:

- Charles Dickens, Great Expectations, a novel that Paul read annually. He claimed to have read every Dickens novel by the age of ten.
- Rilke, The Notebook of Malte Laurids Brigge. Rilke's Duino Elegies also had a profound effect on Paul's own poetry and thinking.
- Boris Pasternak, Doctor Zhivago – which Paul considered a a major novel of the twentieth century, resonating with his own visit to Moscow in 1931.
- The writings of Richard Jefferies, a nineteenth-century nature essayist and mystic almost certainly inspired Paul's initial imaginings of the Woodcraft Folk.
- A series of experimental novels of Henry Williamson.
- Paul was proud to consider himself a surviving contemporary of Thomas Hardy.

In talks Paul recalled burning a large collection of his poetry as a young man, to his later regret, and he noted that, at almost eighty, he was able to recall minute details from the first twenty years of his life but almost nothing from the years between 1925 and 1945. He recalled T. S. Eliot's friendship and support, and fiercely disputed David Miall's suggestion that Eliot was sympathetic to fascism.

== Works ==
- "Pipes of Pan; Poems" (1927)
- "The Ashen Stave, Songs etc" (1928)
- "The Folk Trail; An Outline of the Philosophy and Activities of Woodcraft Fellowships" – Woodcraft Folk leaders manual (Noel Douglas, 1929); on the title page Leslie is described as "Little Otter; Headman of the Woodcraft Folk."
- "The Green Company" (The C. W. Daniel Co., 1931)
- "A Green Love, and Other Poems" (1931)
- "Fugitive Morning" (Dennis Archer, 1932) – early novel
- "Two One-Act Plays: 'Augustus Intervenes'; 'The Picnic Party'" (1933)
- "Periwale: His Odyssey" (Dennis Archer, 1934) – early novel
- "Co-operation with the USSR; A Study of the Consumers' Movement" (1934)
- "Story Without End; The Junior Book of Co-operation" (1935)
- "The Training of Pioneers: The Educational Programme of the Woodcraft Folk" (1936)
- "Men in May" (1936) – early novel based on the events of the 1926 General Strike
- "The Republic of Children; A Handbook for Teachers of Working Class Children" (Allen & Unwin, 1938)
- "The Annihilation of Man" (1945)
- "The Living Hedge" (1946)
- "Heron Lake" (1948) – diary of a year spent in the Norfolk countryside.
- "The Soviet Union" (1948)
- "The Meaning of Human Existence" (1949)
- "Portrait of an Angry Saint; The Poet Peguy" (1949)
- "The Age of Terror" (1950) – on Stalinist Russia.
- Angry Young Man (1951) – autobiography. The title, pluralised, subsequently became a label for a generation of 1950s British writers, including Kingsley Amis and Colin Wilson, and (over-broadly) applied to authors of "kitchen sink dramas".
- "Exile and Other Poems" (1951)
- "Sir Thomas More" (1953)
- "The English Philosophers" (1953)
- "The Adventure of Man, Geographies" (1954)
- "The Jealous God; Three Meditations on Christian Discipline" (1955)
- "The Boy Down Kitchener Street" (Faber & Faber, 1957) – a novel based on Leslie's childhood in London. Jacket design by Edward Ardizzone.
- "Nature into History" (1957)
- "Persons and Perception" (1961)
- "Son of Man; The Life of Christ" (1961)
- "Hot House" (1961)
- "Values in Modern Society" (1962)
- "The Transition from School to Work; a Report Made to King George's Jubilee Trust and Industrial Welfare Society" (1962)
- "Traveller on Sacred Ground" (1963) – journal of his field trip to the Middle East to research 'Son of Man'.
- "The Deployment and Payment of Clergy" (1964)
- "Alternatives to Christian Belief" (1967)
- "The Death and Resurrection of the Church" (1968)
- "Coming to Terms with Sex" (1969)
- "Eros Rediscovered; Restoring Sex to Humanity" (1970)
- "Man's Understanding of Himself" (Hale Memorial Sermon) (1971)
- "Journey to Connemara and Other Poems" (1972)
- "A Church by Daylight; A Reappraisement of the Church of England and its Future" (1973)
- "The Waters and the Wild" (1975) – novel set during the Second World War about two young boys in an East Anglian village.
- "First Love; A Journey" (1977)
- "Rural Society and the Church; the Herford Consultation" (1977) [with Anthony Russell, Laurence Reading, eds.]
- "O Pioneers" (1978) – poetry inspired by time spent in America
- "Bulgarian Horse" (1978) – a Cold War thriller.
- "Springs of Good and Evil; Biblical Themes in Literature" (1979)
- "The Early Days of the Woodcraft Folk" – a historical pamphlet (undated, believed written between 1975 and 1980)
- "The Secret War Against Hitler" (1984)
