= International Falcon Movement – Socialist Educational International =

International non-profit campaining for children's rights

International Falcon Movement - Socialist Educational International
- Founded: 1922; 104 years ago
- Founder: Kurt Löwenstein
- Type: International Umbrella Educational Organisation
- Purpose: Socialism, internationalism, children's rights, democracy
- Location: IFM-SEI, Rue Joseph II, 120, B-1000 Brussels, Belgium
- Origins: European Socialist Education Movements
- Region served: Global
- Method: Popular education
- Employees: 5
- Volunteers: over 1 million
- Website: www.ifm-sei.org
- A fraternal member of Socialist International

The International Falcon Movement – Socialist Educational International (IFM-SEI) is an international non-profit organisation based in Belgium that campaigns for children's rights.

It has member organisations all over the world and is strongest in Europe and South America. Many of its member organisations work with children and young people of all ages through activities, groups and camping.

IFM-SEI members are children and youth self-organisations, family organisations and other organisations who are working for the benefit of children and young peoples. IFM-SEI organise campaigns, for example against child labour or child pornography, seminars, trainings, camps and other educational activities. Their activities are carried out by member organisation, and international seminars are held regularly in cooperation with other fraternal organisations. A recent activity was the Peace Camp with Israelis and Palestinians. The LGBT event of IFM is called Queer Easter.

It is a fraternal organisation of Socialist International and works closely with International Union of Socialist Youth (IUSY) and Young European Socialists (formerly ECOSY). IFM-SEI is a full member of the European Youth Forum (YFJ) which operates within the Council of Europe and European Union area and works closely with both these bodies. In Latin-America it is a full member of the Foro Latin-America de Juventud (FLAJ). It is also part of the International Coordination Meeting of Youth Organisations (ICMYO) which consists of worldwide active youth organisations and regional youth platforms coordinating their activities towards the UN and its agencies.

== President ==
- Max Winter from Rote Falken, (1925)
- Anton Tesarek from Rote Falken, (1955–1959)
- Hans Matzenauer from Rote Falken, (1967–1980)
- Eric Nielsen from DUI leg og virke, (1980–1983)
- Piet Kempenaars from (1983–1985)
- Eric Nilsson from Unga Örnar, (1985)
- Jerry Svensson from Unga Örnar, (1985–1995)
- Jessi Sörensen from DUI leg og virke, (1995–2001)
- Östen Lövgren from Unga Örnar, (2001–2005)
- Ted Birch from Unga Örnar,(2005–2007)
- Tim Scholz from SJD - Die Falken (2007–2013)
- Ana Maria Almario from Acacia Fondacion (2013–2016)
- Sylvia Siqueira Campos from Mirim (2016–2018)
- Christina Schauer from Kinderfreunde Rote Falken, (2018–2022)
- Shesica Páez from Esplais catalans (2024-present)

== Secretaries General ==
- Kurt Biak from (Voluntary) (1931)
- Miguel Angel Martínez Martínez from (first full-time) (1966–1972)
- Ilpo Rossi from Nuoret Kotkat, (1972–1976)
- Ulric Andersen from Unga Örnar, (1976–1979)
- Jacqui Cottyn from (1979–1995)
- Odette Lambert from (1995–2001)
- Uwe Ostendorff from SJD - Die Falken (2001–2007)
- Tamsin Pearce from Woodcraft Folk, (2007–2013)
- Christine Sudbrock from (2013–2016)
- Carly Walker-Dawson from Woodcraft Folk, (2016–2020)
- Ruba Hilal from Independence Youth Union, (2020–2023)
- Maria Felisa Gómez Mora from SFYU (2025-present)

== Current Presidium ==
The Presidium is made up of the Secretary-General, President, Vice President and one Presidium members from each region (Africa, Latin America, Middle East, Europe and Asia) to make a total of 8 members. Regional Representatives have one seat reserved for a woman and one seat reserved for a person under 30. The last elections were held in May 2023.

- Shesica Páez (President) Esplais Catalans,
- Adalit Collantes (Vice-President) Club infantil CHAP "Mayo 23",
- Mohammed Diab (Midle-East Presidium Member) Ajyal,
- Jorge Gómez (Latin America Presidium Member) Integridad Absoluta

== Republics and Camps of the IFM-SEI ==
There were four children's republics held by the international before World War II:

- 1933 First Republic: Oostduinkerke, Belgium
- 1935 Second Republic: Verneuil-l'Étang, France. 900 children from Austria, Belgium, Czechoslovakia, France, UK and Switzerland.
- 1937 Third Republic: Brighton, England. Theme: Solidarity, 2,000 participants from Belgium, Czechoslovakia, France, Britain, Spain and Tunisia.
- 1939 Fourth Republic: Wandre, in Liège, Belgium. Theme: Freedom and Peace, 1,600 participants, from Belgium, France, UK, Switzerland, Tunisia and refugee children from Spain.

Since the end of World War II the IFM-SEI organises international camps as well as encouraging bi- and multi-lateral camps between members. The following is a list of official IFM-SEI camps held since 1945:

- 1946 Brighton, England
- 1951 Döbriach, Austria
- 1952 Füssen, Federal Republic of Germany
- 1955 Oslo, Norway
- 1956 Stockholm, Sweden
- 1958 Vienna, Austria
- 1961 Deurne, Belgium
- 1965 Reinwarzhofen, Federal Republic of Germany
- 1967 Scunthorpe, England
- 1971 Lahti, Finland
- 1974 Döbriach, Austria
- 1977 Oslo, Norway
- 1981 Walsrode, Federal Republic of Germany
- 1985 Döbriach, Austria
- 1988 Imatra, Finland
- 1991 Norrköping, Sweden
- 1994 Reinwarzhofen, Germany
- 1997 Zanka, Hungary
- 2000 Döbriach, Austria. Theme: Children's Rights. 1000 participants.
- 2006 Kent, England. Theme: Millennium Development Goals. 5000 participants.
- 2010 Döbriach, Austria and Jedovnice, Czech Republic. Theme: Train 4 Change. 1000 participants.
- 2016 Reinwarzhofen, Germany. Theme: Welcome to Another World.
- 2022 Northamptonshire, England. Theme: Common Ground – International Friendship and Solidarity. Originally planned for 2020 it was postponed due to the Covid epidemic.
- 2023 Nurmes, Finland. Theme:

Yhessä Together, International, doing things together.

== Member organisations ==
Member and candidate organisations are listed here:

=== Africa ===
- Girls Excel
- Youth Advocates Ghana
- Oyoun Masr Association
- Pionniers du Mali
- Action Enfance Senegal
- Mouvement National des Pionniers Senegalais
- Union Youth Saguiet el-Hamra and Rio de Oro
- Patsimederu Trust

=== Americas ===
- Organizacion Nueva Generacion
- Manque Chile
- Agrupacion Integridad Absoluta
- Movimiento Infantil Luis Alfonso Velásquez Flores (MILAVF)
- Los Cachorros
- Club infantil CHAP "Mayo 23"
- Mundo Nuevo
- Juventud País Solidario (JPS)

=== Asia ===
- Antar Bharati
- KKSP Foundation
- Youth Organization of Bhutan (exile in Nepal)
- Ajyal
- Independence Youth Union
- Independent Youth Forum
- Seeds Association for Development and Culture 'Bothoor'
- Association for Social Democracy

=== Europe ===
- Arciragazzi
- Armenian Youth Federation (ARF-YO)
- DUI - Leg og Virke
- Esplais Catalans
- Faucons Rouges
- Framfylkingen
- Georgian Falcons
- Hungarian Childfriends
- Kinderfreunde / Rote Falken
- Lietuvos Sakaliuku sajunga
- Nuorten Kotkain Keskusliitto
- Pionýr
- Rode Valken, RVPA
- Sozialistische Jugend Deutschlands-Die Falken
- Slovenian Falcons Youth Union (SFYU)
- SYB - The Falcons Belarus (in exile in Lithuania)
- Woodcraft Folk
