= Esplais Catalans =

- Abbreviation: ESPLAC
- Type: Non-governmental organisation
- Purpose: Education
- Headquarters: Barcelona
- Location: Spain
- Region served: Catalonia
- Members: 9,800
- Affiliations: International Falcon Movement
- Staff: 1,600
- Website: esplac.cat/

Esplais Catalans (ESPLAC) is a non-profit children's education organisation and is the largest esplai federation in Catalonia

It is a member of the International Falcon Movement – Socialist Educational International. It states to have over 7,300 children as members and 1,600 leaders.
