= Socialist Youth of Germany – The Falcons =

Youth wing, founded 1904

Socialist Youth of Germany – The Falcons Sozialistische Jugend Deutschlands – Die Falken
- Chairperson: Micki Börchers & Johnathan Schweizer
- Founded: 1904
- Headquarters: Berlin, Germany
- International affiliation: International Falcon Movement and International Union of Socialist Youth
- Website: www.wir-falken.de

The Socialist Youth of Germany – The Falcons (German: Sozialistische Jugend Deutschlands – Die Falken, SJD – Die Falken) is a voluntary organisation of children and young people. Like Jusos, the youth organisation of the Social Democratic Party of Germany (SPD), The Falcons are member of the International Union of Socialist Youth. The Falcons are also a member of the International Falcon Movement.

As a political organisation with a history of over 90 years, the Falcons organise camps and other spare time activities to encourage children and young people for more democracy, social justice, equality and a substantial change in society.
