= Himmelstalund =

Park in Norrköping, Sweden

Coordinates: 58°35′33″N 16°08′55″E

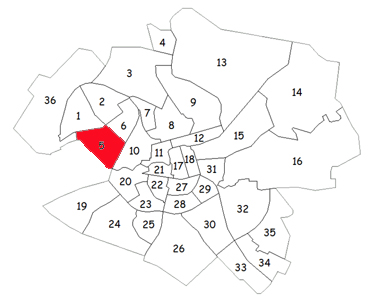
Himmelstalund

Himmelstalund is a large park/open space in Norrköping, Sweden.

The park is known for having one of Sweden's densest collection of petroglyphs, with more than 1,600 rock carvings across 60 panels. The first scientific investigations of the carvings occurred in 1871, and it has been estimated the oldest works were made c. 1600 BC. Some of the depicted boats having a similar shape as the Hjortspring boat.

== Petroglyphs ==
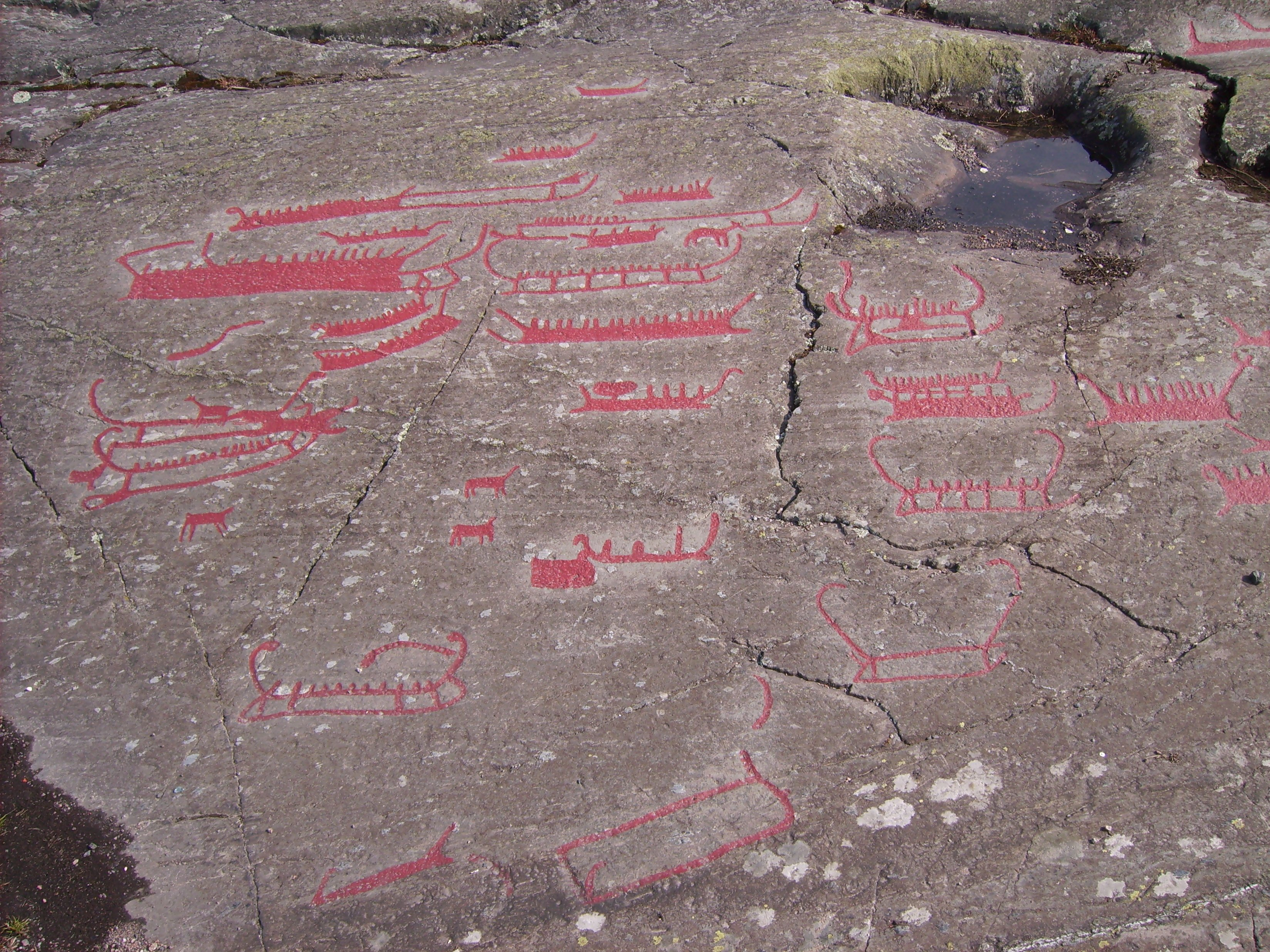

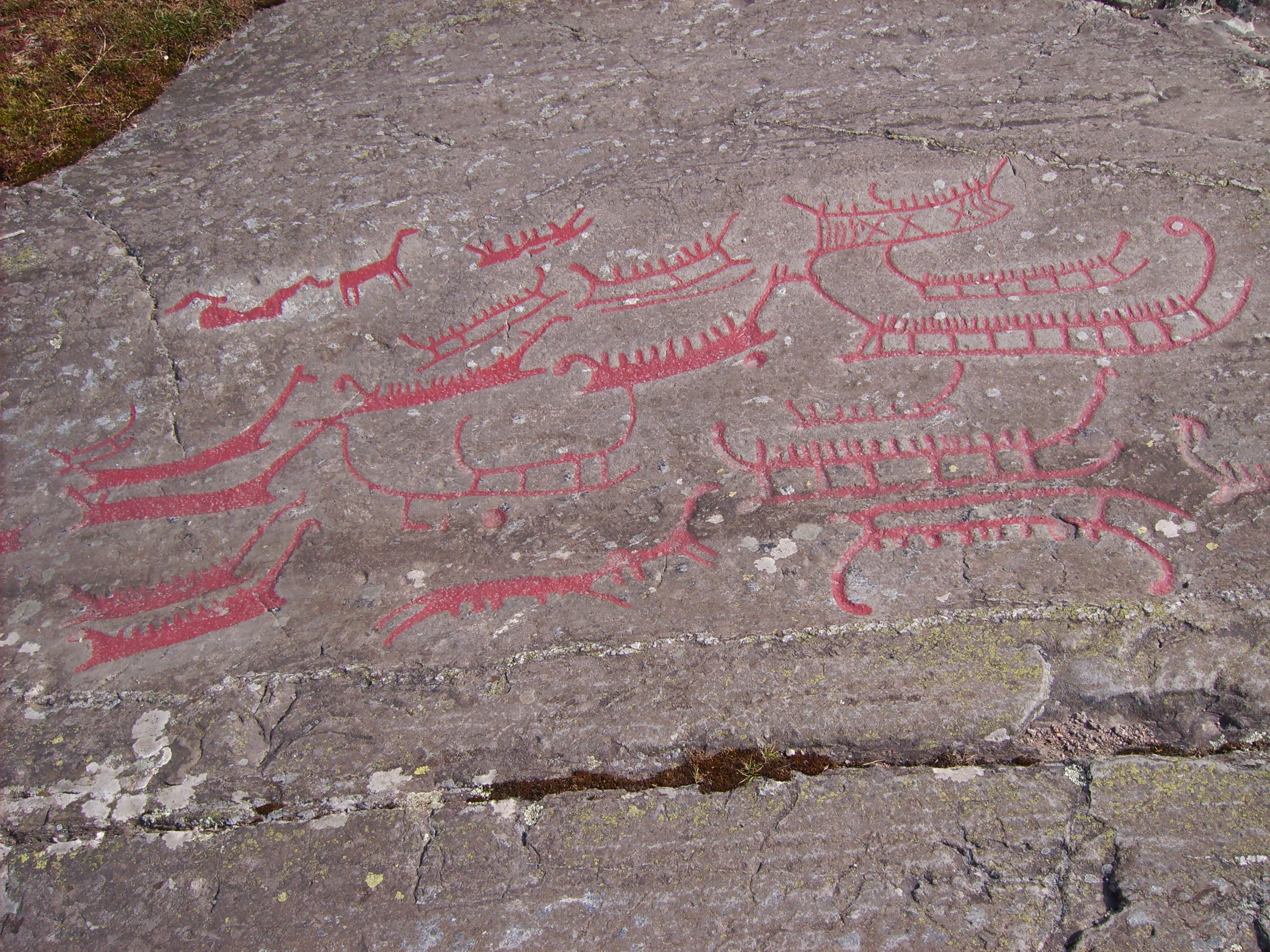

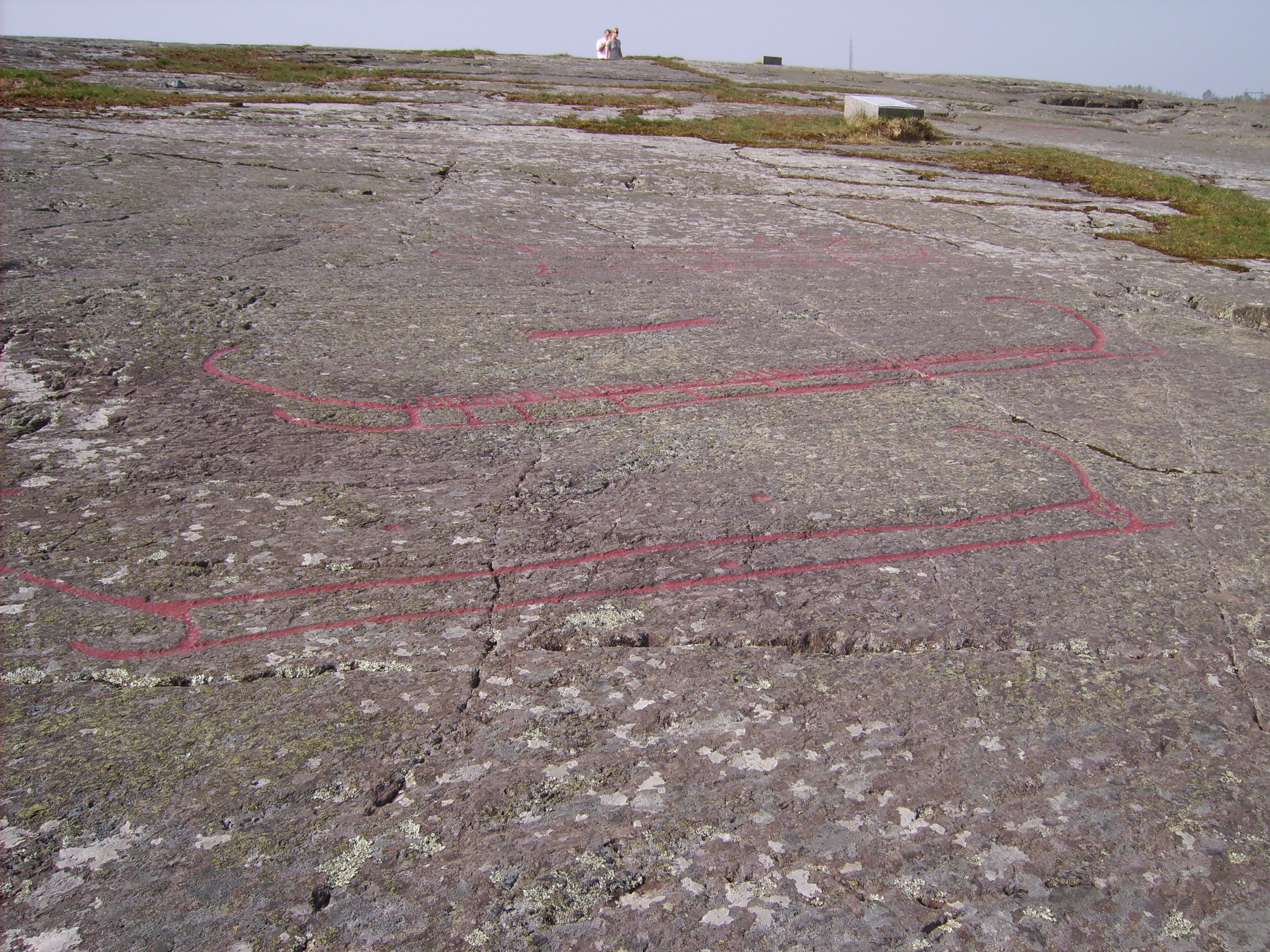

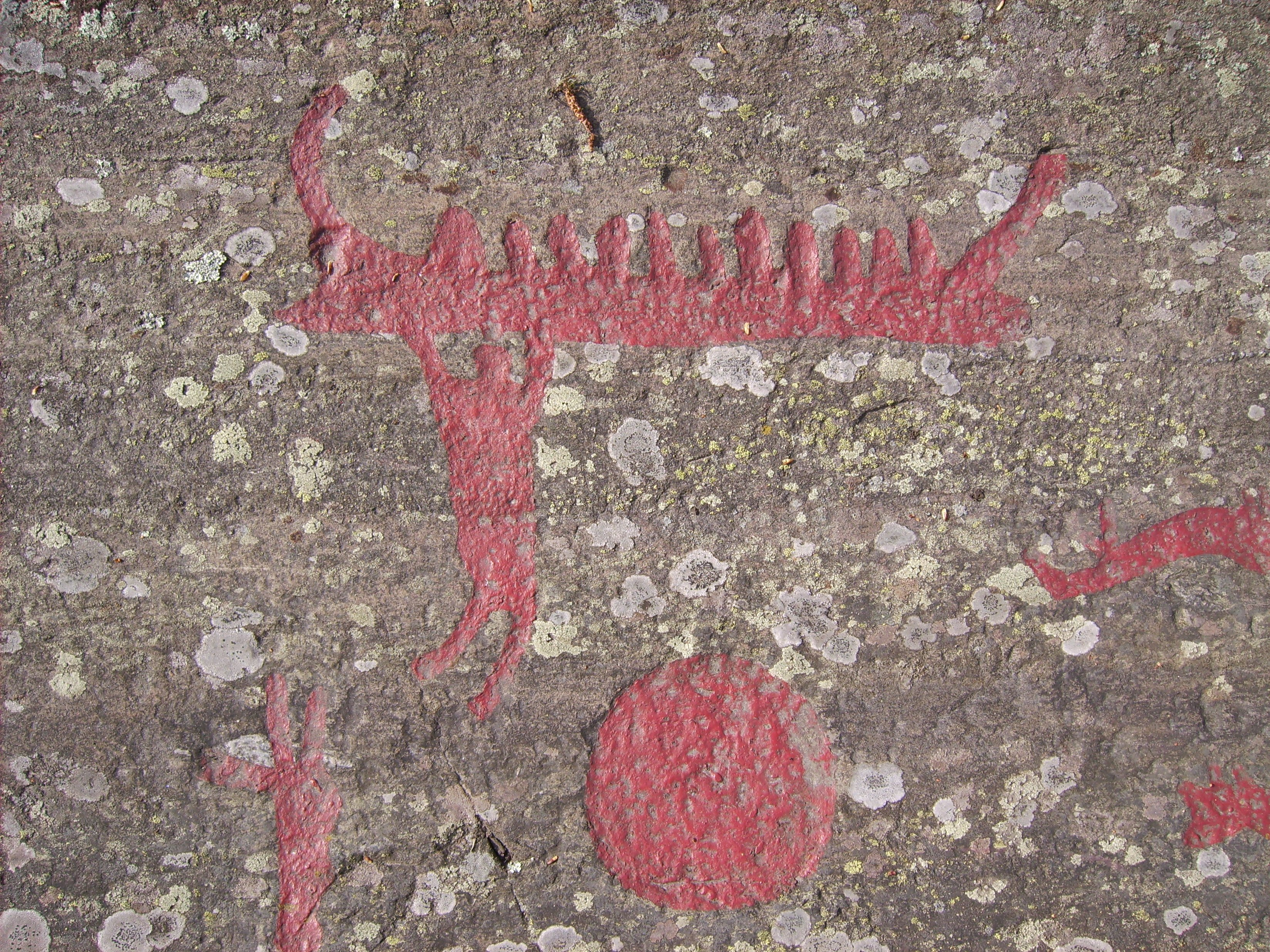
