= Red Falcons =

Name of socialist children organizations

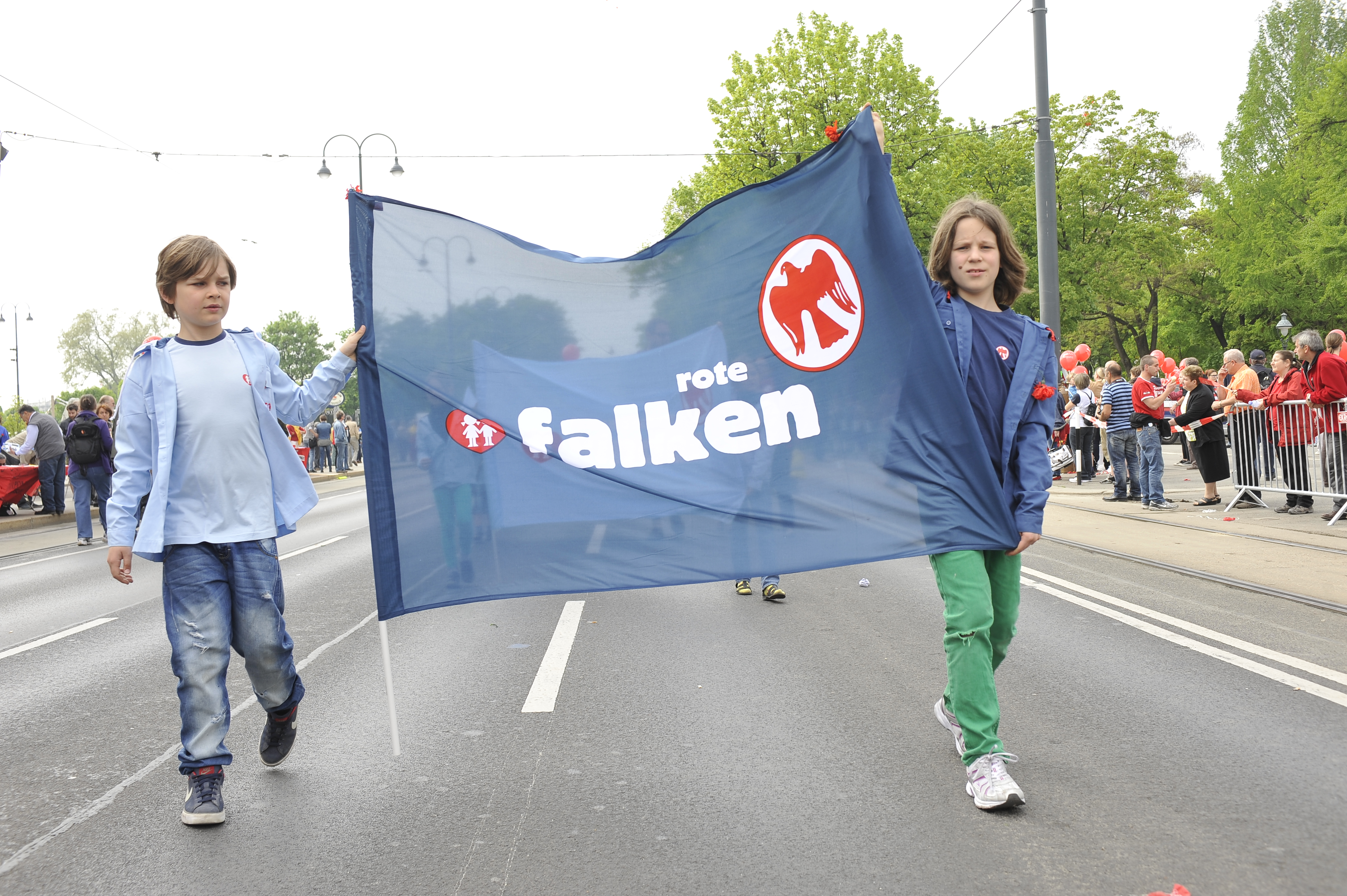
Two kids holding a Red Falcons flag in their native language on May 1st, 2013

Red Falcons was the name of various socialist children's organizations, popular in Europe and the United States which emerged during the First and Second World Wars. The first such group was founded in the early 20th century by Anton Tesarek, a socialist educator from Austria, under the name "Rote Falken." The origin of the name is unclear; one possible explanation is that the Falcon is a bird of prey with no imperial links (the eagle was the symbol of the German empire, adopted later by the Nazis.) It is red to symbolise socialism.

== Red Falcons of America ==
=== Establishment ===
The Red Falcons of America was established by the Socialist Party of America (SPA) in July 1932. The group was targeted at children who might otherwise be swept up by the Boy Scouts and Girl Scouts movement, which was seen as a training organization for the military, or the Sunday schools, which were seen as a source of passivity and fatalism.

An age gap was seen in the American socialist youth movement, with the Socialist Sunday Schools only accepting children up to the age of 10 while the Young People's Socialist League (YPSL) began taking members only at the age of 14. The new organization was seen as a means of filling this unserved age gap.

Boys and girls between the ages of 8 and 15 were eligible for membership in the Red Falcons. The organization's stated purposes included training its young members "for service in the class struggle" and developing them for future membership in the YPSL.

=== Divisions ===
The American Red Falcons had two divisions, the "Young Falcons" (sometimes called "Red Sparks"), ages 8–11; and the "Red Falcons" proper, ages 11–15. These groups were led by older mentors recruited from the ranks of the Young People's Socialist League (YPSL).

=== Structure ===
The Red Falcons were structured in a manner analogous to scouts and participating children wore distinct uniforms. The basic unit of the Red Falcons was known as a "flight." An auxiliary organization of the SPA was established to organize and financially support these local flights, known as Friends of Workers Children (FWC). These FWC "clubs" were intended to gather supportive parents, community trade unionists, teachers, and interested adults in order to "bolster up the work of the local Falcon flight" through advice, financial aid, and publicity.

The Red Falcons and Friends of Workers Children held a national convention in Cleveland, Ohio in the spring of 1936 to better coordinate national activities. It was at this time that the American organization joined the International Falcon Movement, headquartered in Europe and associated with the Socialist International. National Secretary of the Red Falcons and Friends of Workers Children in that year was Harry Fleischman. The group maintained a headquarters office in the Moxley Building in Chicago.

The Red Falcons issued a monthly publication for its members called The Falcon Call. In addition, some of the local Falcon flights issued their own mimeographed bulletins.

The Falcon organization attempted to emulate the Scouting movement by stressing outdoor and athletic activities rather than structured lectures.

=== Membership size ===
About seven months after the launch of the Red Falcons in America about 25 Red Falcon flights had been organized with an estimated total membership of between 250 and 350. The organization apparently grew considerably during its first year, with a membership of "around 900" divided into 45 local groups claimed in the summer of 1933.

== International Falcon Movement ==
The various national Red Falcon organizations are generally members of the International Falcon Movement - Socialist Education International.

== See also ==
- Pioneer movement
- Young People's Socialist League
- Sotsyalistishe Kinder Farband
