= Ruth Clark =

Ruth Clark may refer to:

- Ruth Clark (author) (1899–1964), British author of the first woodcraft book for girls
- Ruth Clark (pollster) (1917–1997), American pollster and researcher
- Ruth B. Clark, state legislator in Colorado
- Ruth Colvin Clark (born 1943), American educational psychologist
- Ruth H. Clark (1916–2022), American politician in Connecticut
