= Woodcraft League of America =

Youth program (estb. 1901)

- Owner: Bob Yeager
- Headquarters: WLA Pennsylvania
- Location: Valencia, Pennsylvania
- Country: United States of America
- Founded: 1901
- Founder: Ernest Thompson Seton
- Website https://www.WoodcraftLeague.com

Woodcraft League of America, originally called the Woodcraft Indians and League of Woodcraft Indians, is a youth program, established by Ernest Thompson Seton in 1901. Despite the name, the program was created for non-Indian children. At first the group was for boys only, but later it would also include girls. Seton instructed the children in his town in Connecticut in woodcraft – knowledge and skills of life in the woods – and based much of the group's terminology and structure on the misconceptions about Native Americans that were common in that era. The program spread internationally to become the Woodcraft Movement and many of these programs still exist. Seton's Woodcraft scheme also had a strong influence on later youth programs and organizations, particularly, the Scout Movement.

== History ==
The first Woodcraft "Tribe" was established at Cos Cob, Connecticut, United States of America, in 1901. Seton's property had been vandalized by a group of boys from the local school. After having to repaint his gate a number of times, he went to the school, and invited the boys to the property for a weekend, rather than prosecuting them.

The unique feature of his program was that the boys elected their own leaders: a "Chief", a "Second Chief", a "Keeper of the Tally" and a "Keeper of the Wampum".

Seton wrote a series of seven articles for Ladies' Home Journal from May to November 1902 under the heading "Seton's Boys" that were later published as the Birch Bark Roll. At the urging of his friend Rudyard Kipling, Seton published Two Little Savages (1903) as a novel, rather than a dictionary of Woodcraft.

Interest in the Woodcraft Indians spread to the United Kingdom and Seton traveled there in 1906 to promote his books and Woodcraft outdoor organization. Seton met Robert Baden-Powell, and gave him a copy of the Birch Bark Roll. Although one of many influences, Seton's book had a strong influence on Baden-Powell's book, Scouting for Boys.

In 1910, the Woodcraft Indians were merged into the fledgling Boy Scouts of America (BSA) by Seton and he wrote the BSA's first handbook, Boy Scouts of America: Official Handbook, A Handbook of Woodcraft, Scouting, and Life-craft and became the Chief Scout of the BSA for five years. After a fallout with James E. West, Seton left the BSA in 1915 and re-established the Woodcraft Indians separately. He claimed to have never really merged his organization into the BSA. The Woodcraft League of America was a co-educational program open to children between ages "4 and 94".

Seton established a program he called "Brownies" in 1921 for girls and boys ages 6–11, based on his earlier book, Woodland Tales.

The organization consisted of the Big Lodge for Boys (12–18 years of age), the Big Lodge for Girls (12–18 years of age), as well as the Woodcraft Club and Sun Lodge for Male and Female Adults. The Red Lodge or Medicine Lodge also existed for a time, it was for men over the age of 21 interested in a more spiritual approach to Woodcraft.

There were many local Woodcraft groups in the United States in the early part of the 20th century. Camps following the Woodcraft Program in the United States and Canada were also founded by friends and students of Seton.

The Woodcraft League influenced the formation of Lone Scouts inspired in 1912 by John Hargrave.

In the United Kingdom, the Woodcraft League influenced the Order of Woodcraft Chivalry formed in 1916, the Kindred of the Kibbo Kift formed in 1920 and Woodcraft Folk formed in 1925 and Camp Fire Girls (UK).

When Seton died in 1946, Ellsworth Jaeger, an author and curator of the Buffalo Museum of Science, and a founding member of The Woodcraft League of America, wrote a letter to Seton's wife suggesting how to keep the Woodcraft League going. Seton's family was not interested in doing so and the League dissolved. Seventy-five years later, in 2021, Ellsworth Jaeger's great-great-nephew Bob Yeager of western Pennsylvania started a new Woodcraft League of America. Programs include Little Sprouts (4–6 years of age), Forest Explorers (7–9 years of age), Junior Woodsmen (10–11 years of age), Young Entrepreneurs (11–18 Years of Age), Apprentice Campers (12+ years of age), Journeyman Campers (14+ years of age), Journeyman Woodsmen (16+ years of age), and Master Woodsman (18+ years of age).

== See also ==
- Woodcraft (youth movement)
- The Woodcraft Folk
- Cultural appropriation
- Kibbo Kift
- Plastic shaman
- Playing Indian
- Scoutcraft
- Youth rights
- Youth participation
- History of youth work
- List of youth organizations
