= Point Counter Point =

1928 Novel by Aldous Huxley

- Cover of first edition
- Author: Aldous Huxley
- Language: English
- Publisher: Doubleday Doran
- Publication date: 1928
- Pages: 432
- OCLC: 1395954

Point Counter Point is a novel by Aldous Huxley, first published in 1928. It is Huxley's longest novel, and was notably more complex and serious than his earlier fiction.

In 1998, the Modern Library ranked Point Counter Point 44th on its list of the 100 best English-language novels of the 20th century.

The novel entered the public domain in the United States in 2024.

== Title and construction ==
The novel's title is a reference to the flow of arguments in a debate, and a series of these exchanges tell the story. Instead of a single central plot, there are a number of interlinked story lines and recurring themes (as in musical "counterpoint"). As a roman à clef, many of the characters are based on real people, most of whom Huxley knew personally, such as D. H. Lawrence, Katherine Mansfield, Nancy Cunard, and John Middleton Murry, and Huxley is depicted as the novel's novelist, Philip Quarles. Huxley described the structure of Point Counter Point within the novel itself, in a stream of consciousness musing of Quarles:

The musicalization of fiction. Not in the symbolist way, by subordinating sense to sound. . . . But on a large scale, in the construction. Meditate on Beethoven. The changes of moods, the abrupt transitions . . . More interesting still, the modulations, not merely from one key to another, but from mood to mood. A theme is stated, then developed, pushed out of shape, imperceptibly deformed, until, though still recognizably the same, it has become quite different. . . . Get this into a novel. How? The abrupt transitions are easy enough. All you need is a sufficiency of characters and parallel, contrapuntal plots. . . . You alternate the theme. More interesting, the modulations and variations are also more difficult. A novelist modulates by reduplicating situations and characters. He shows several people falling in love, or dying, or praying in different ways -- dissimilars solving the same problem. Or, vice versa, similar people confronted with dissimilar problems. In this way you can modulate through all the aspects of your theme, you can write variations in any number of different moods. Another way: The novelist can assume the god-like creative privilege and simply elect to consider the events in the story in their various aspects -- emotional, scientific, religious, metaphysical, etc. He will modulate from one to the other -- as, from the aesthetic to the physico-chemical aspect of things, from the religious to the physiological or financial. . . . Put a novelist in the novel. He justifies aesthetic generalizations, which may be interesting -- at least to me. He also justifies experiment. Specimens of his work may illustrate other possible or impossible ways of telling a story."

== Main characters and storylines ==
Some of the main characters are:

- Walter Bidlake, a young journalist. A weak and ineffectual man, Walter is living with Marjorie Carling, a married woman whose husband refuses to grant her a divorce. Marjorie is pregnant with Walter's child, but their relationship is disintegrating, largely because Walter has fallen desperately in love with the sexually aggressive and independent Lucy Tantamount (based on Nancy Cunard, with whom Huxley had a similarly unsatisfactory affair).
- John Bidlake, Walter's father, a painter (based on Augustus John). He is famous for his work and for his scandalous love life. However, his recent paintings show a creative decline, which he himself recognises but refuses to admit. He has an illness which is eventually diagnosed as terminal cancer. His wife Mrs. Bidlake is inspired by Lady Ottoline Morrell.
- Philip Quarles, a writer (a self-portrait of Huxley) and his wife Elinor, John Bidlake's daughter. They return from India to England. Quarles is a withdrawn, cerebral man, ill at ease with the everyday world and its emotions; Elinor loves him, but is tempted to enter into an affair with the bold and attractive Everard Webley, a political demagogue and leader of his own quasi-military group, the Brotherhood of British Freemen. (Webley is often assumed to be based on Oswald Mosley, but there are reasons for doubting this: see below.) Quarles' father, Sidney, is unlike his son: outwardly impressive, he is in reality pretentious, feeble and self-indulgent. An undistinguished MP and failed businessman, he has retired from public life, supposedly to concentrate on writing a vast and definitive study of democracy. In fact he has written nothing, but he employs a secretary; the girl becomes pregnant by him and threatens to make a scandal. Philip and Elinor have a young son, little Phil, who becomes ill and dies of meningitis.
- Mark Rampion, a writer and painter. Based on D. H. Lawrence, whom Huxley admired greatly, Rampion is a fierce critic of modern society. A full chapter in flashback shows Rampion's courtship and marriage to his wife, Mary (based on Lawrence's wife Frieda).
- Maurice Spandrell, an intellectual desperately and unsuccessfully searching for proof of the divine in his life (based on Charles Baudelaire, who of course did not live in Huxley's time). For years Spandrell has devoted himself to vice and deliberate wickedness in order to prompt a reaction from God. He has found some pleasure in the corruption of an innocent young girl, both in the act itself and in his own feelings of remorse, but when he is not divinely punished, he looks for an even larger sin to force God's hand. He believes that if there is no real evidence of God's existence, everything in life is pointless. He meets Frank Illidge, a young scientist of working-class origin, and taunts him for his angry left-wing rhetoric and actual political impotence in order to persuade him into helping him murder Everard Webley. Tragically, there is still no obvious heavenly negative and personal consequences for this ultimate sin, except to strengthen Webley's Brotherhood of British Freemen. Spandrell sends an anonymous note to the Brotherhood, informing them that the murderer is at his address. He tries one last time to find God's presence in the world when he asks Rampion whether Beethoven's String Quartet No 15, played on the newly invented gramophone, (to symbolize the collision of science and technology with art) is an indication or proof of God. Rampion answers that even the sublimest of music, such as Beethoven's composition that they are listening to, is not a proof of God. When the men from the Brotherhood turn up at his door, he essentially commits suicide by firing his pistol, provoking them to shoot him dead. Meanwhile the third movement from Beethoven's String Quartet No. 15 plays in the background.
- Denis Burlap, Walter Bidlake's editor. Based on John Middleton Murry, Burlap is in his writings and public image a Christian and an anguished, self-accusing moralist; in his inner thoughts and private behaviour, however, he is calculating, avaricious and libidinous. He lives with Beatrice Gilray (based on Dorothy Brett, painter), who at thirty-five remains a virgin, having been molested as a young girl; for some time their relationship is platonic, but Burlap succeeds in seducing her. The novel ends with his having secured several thousand dollars for a book, St Francis and the Modern Psyche, and enjoying an evening of sensual pleasure with Beatrice.

== Real-world British fascists ==
Comparisons have been made between the character Everard Webley with his Brotherhood of British Freemen and Oswald Mosley with the British Union of Fascists. However, when Huxley wrote Point Counter Point, Mosley was still a prominent member of the Labour Party and would remain so until 1931. The BUF was not founded until 1932. A number of other fascist groups preceded Mosley, the most prominent being the British Fascists, and possibly one of those may have been Huxley's inspiration. In the 1996 reprint of Point Counter Point, Mosley's son Nicholas discusses the connection in a new introduction to the novel. David Bradshaw has argued that the most likely source for Webley is John Hargrave, the founder of The Kindred of the Kibbo Kift.

== Adaptations ==
- Point Counter Point (1968), miniseries directed by Rex Tucker
  A BBC mini-series by Simon Raven, starring Tristram Jellinek. It was later broadcast on PBS television in 1972.
