= Red Lodge (United States) =

Fraternal organization

The Red Lodge was a fraternal organization that traced its lineage back to 1912 with the creation of the Red Lodge or Medicine Lodge by Ernest Thompson Seton within the Woodcraft Movement . They describe themselves as a Brotherhood of men who have an appreciation for the outdoors, who are interested in the mystic side of Woodcraft and who have learned that true power comes from self-control.

== History ==
In 1902 Ernest Thompson Seton created the Woodcraft Indians in Cos Cob, Connecticut. Despite the name, it was a group for non-Indian youth. He used the program to teach youth about the importance of nature, personal development and democracy. The program would grow to become a national organization, but in the later years dwindle in membership.

In 1912 a book was printed in the form of 100 scrolls. The scrolls are titled The Red Lodge and they were written by Ernest Thompson Seton.

By 1917 the Red Lodge went through a name and policy change, it now allowed females to join, and became known as the Sun Lodge. In 1916 Ernest Westlake founded the Order of Woodcraft Chivalry, he appointed Ernest Thompson Seton as the honorary Grand Chieftain. The Order of Woodcraft Chivalry included the Sun Lodge as a type of innermost circle. Audrey Westlake, the son of Ernest is quoted to have described the Sun Lodge as "in a sense, the church of the movement".

== Organization ==
=== The Mother Lodge ===
The Mother Lodge serves as the Grand Lodge for the Red Lodge organization. It has the right to grant or deny annual charters to all Red Lodges. The Mother Lodge functions the same way as the individual Red Lodges the only difference being its charter granting ability.

=== Red Lodge ===
A Red Lodge is the basic unit of membership, it can be formed with the approval of The Mother Lodge and only after a charter has been granted. Three or more men who have achieved the Dibando degree are required to form a new lodge.

== Degrees ==
=== Candidate ===
In order to be considered a Mikana or Candidate for membership, an individual must be a man of 21 years of age. The individual must strongly desire membership in the Order. The individual must sleep outside for no less than 100 nights. They must wait until a spot in the Lodge opens up (There is a 24-person limit per lodge). Two members of the Lodge need to vouch for his membership.

=== First Degree ===
In order to become a Dibando or Brother of the first degree, an individual must first have been found by the Council to be a Mikana. The individual must create a fire by friction thus creating "Sacred Fire". Next he must be sunburnt to the waist in what is referred to as a "Sundance" [sic]. The Mikana will then be instructed to keep a fire going in the wilderness from sunset to sunrise thus completing a "Vigil". He will then need to read and understand the "Four Mystic Rolls". The Mikana will then be subjected to a secret vote of the entire Lodge, upon which if found worthy will be installed as a Dibando or "Brave of Low Degree".

=== Second Degree ===
In order to become a Minisino or Brother of the second degree, an individual must have been a Dibando for no less than 4 months. He must memorize 500 words of Native American sign language, and spend 4 days using nothing but signs and writing to communicate. He must also craft a shelter in the wilderness as well as many survival items that can be found in the book The Red Lodge. He must have abstained from a bad habit for a 4-month period. He must fast for a period of 48 hours, alone in a high place. Once installed after passing the Ordeal he is assigned a permanent seat in the Lodge and his shield is hung.

== Officers ==
=== Wise Councillors ===
Each Lodge is to be governed over by eight Councillors who are appointed by democratic vote in early October. The eight then choose a Head Chief and Second Chief.

=== Wumpum-Keeper ===
This officer serves as a treasurer for the Lodge. The Wumpum-Keeper is appointed by the Head Chief and serves the same term as the Chief. The Wumpum-keeper is chosen from among the eight elected Councillors. The appointed individual handles all financial dealings of the Lodge including dues, fines and donations.

=== Keeper of the Tally Roll or Winter Count ===
This officer serves as a secretary for the Lodge. The Keeper of the Tally Roll is appointed in a similar fashion to the Wumpum-Keeper. This officer is charged with taking minutes during Lodge meetings. The Keeper of the Winter Count is charged with keeping the Painted Robe of Record updated. These two offices may be separate or invested in one individual.

=== Keeper of the Lodge ===
The Keeper of the Lodge is appointed in a similar fashion to the Wumpum-Keeper. This officer is charged with planning out and carrying out the feasts and gatherings of the Lodge. The Officer is also charged with storing and maintaining the equipment used by the Order including the ceremonial Red Tipi.

== Insignia ==
=== The Totem ===
The Totem [sic] or emblem of The Red Lodge consists of a purple Thunder-bird superimposed on a turquoise background with red eyes, and below it a red lodge. The totem is surrounded by a rim of yellow. All of the Brethren of the Lodge may wear the Totem signifying membership in the first or second degree. In all of Woodcraft the Thunder-bird alone is reserved and can only be worn by members of The Red Lodge.

=== The Mikana ===
The Mikana or "One on the Trail" is another word for a candidate seeking membership in the Lodge. They are not entitled to wear anything because they are not yet members of the Order.

=== The Dibando ===
The Dibando or "Brave of Low Degree" may wear a headband, as well as the Thunder-bird emblem upon a weapon or their clothing.

=== The Minisino ===
The Minisino or "Proven One" are entitled to wear the headband and one eagle feather. They are also entitled to wear two bands of wumpum about both spear-arms signifying the Dibando and Minisino degrees. They are also entitled to wear the Thunder-bird emblem upon a weapon or their clothing.

=== The Grand Council ===
The eight Minisinos elected to be members of The Grand Council in an individual lodge are entitled to wear face paint

== See also ==
- Cultural appropriation
- Plastic shaman
- Playing Indian
- Woodcraft (youth movement)
- Redface
- Stereotypes about indigenous peoples of North America
