= Ruth Clark (author) =

British writer (1899–1964)

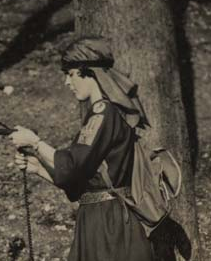
- Clark in Kibbo Kift attire, c.1923
- Born: November 29, 1899; Sunderland
- Died: October 2, 1964 (aged 64); Scarborough
- Spouse: John Hargrave
- Children: Ivan Gordon Hargrave
- Writing career
- Pen name: Minobi
- Subject: Woodcraft
- Notable work: Camp Fire Training for Girls
- Movement: Kibbo Kift

Ruth Clark (Woodcraft name: Minobi, meaning Glad Heart) (29 November 1899 – 2 October 1964) was the author of the first woodcraft book for girls and an active original member of the Kibbo Kift.

Clark authored and illustrated Camp Fire Training for Girls, the first woodcraft book for girls. Published in 1919, it had a foreword by Lady Baden-Powell.

Clark was a member of the Camp Fire Girls movement as a girl. She was the leader of The Merrie Campers group of woodcraft girls. She was a co-founder of the Kibbo Kift and incorporated her girls into it, but was not involved in the Green Shirt Movement for Social Credit.

Clark was born in Sunderland. She married John Hargrave on 28 November 1919. They had one son, Ivan Gordon Hargrave (1920–1992). Clark and Hargrave "parted company" in the early 1930s and were divorced in the 1950s. She died in Scarborough in 1964.

== See also ==
- Elsie J. Oxenham
- Margaret Simey
