= Godshill, Hampshire =

Village and parish in Hampshire, England

Coordinates: 50°55′48″N 1°45′36″W

Godshill
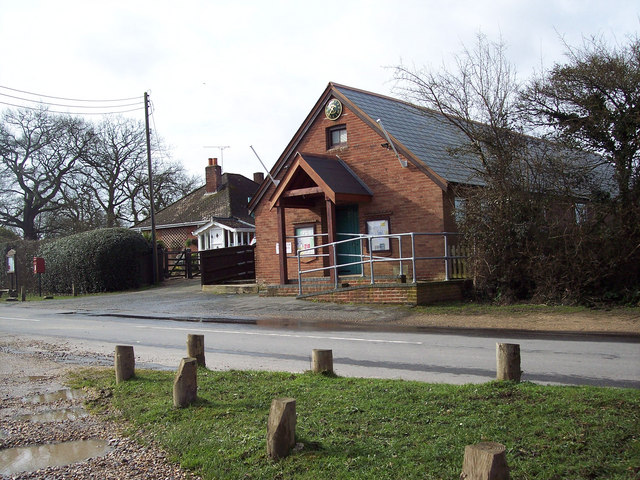
- Godshill Village Hall

- Location within Hampshire
- Population: 458; 436 (2011 Census)
- OS grid reference: SU170145
- District: New Forest
- Shire county: Hampshire
- Region: South East
- Country: England
- Sovereign state: United Kingdom
- Post town: FORDINGBRIDGE
- Postcode district: SP6
- Dialling code: 01425
- Police: Hampshire and Isle of Wight
- Fire: Hampshire and Isle of Wight
- Ambulance: South Central
- UK Parliament: New Forest West

Godshill is a village and civil parish and in New Forest National Park in Hampshire, England. It is about 1 1/2 miles (2.4 km) east of the town of Fordingbridge and 10 miles (16 km) south of the city of Salisbury.

== Description ==
Godshill is a small village, scattered on either side of the B3078 road east of Fordingbridge. The village is generally 18th and 19th century in date, with a number of cob-and-thatched cottages intermixed with brick-with-slate-roof buildings. The village pub is known as "The Fighting Cocks" because there was once a cockpit here. The village cricket pitch of Godshill Cricket Club is half a mile east of Godshill village, surrounded by the gorse and heather of the New Forest. Godshill is also the location of the Sandy Balls holiday park.

== History ==
People have lived in the Godshill area since prehistoric times. On Cockley Hill, east of Godshill, an earth pit, used for boiling water, has been discovered dating from the Bronze Age, around 3000 years ago. Half a mile west of the village is the Iron Age fort of Frankenbury Camp. The east bank of the River Avon at Armsley, in the north-west of the parish, has yielded evidence of Iron Age and Roman era occupation. Four coins of the Durotriges tribe were found in 1959 together with a bronze fibula. Excavations have also found glazed pottery from the 1st or 2nd century AD, as well as evidence of metal-working.

Godshill is not mentioned in the Domesday Book. One New Forest location listed as Godesmanescamp was erroneously identified by antiquarians as Godshill, and as a consequence, the name Godesmanescamp mistakenly appeared on some Ordnance Survey maps as an alternative name for Frankenbury Camp. About one mile northwest of Godshill, (although within the parish of Woodgreen) is Castle Hill, which is said to be the only likely relic of a Norman fortification in the New Forest.

In 1571 the so-called manor of Godshill was sold by Henry Earl of Arundel, John Lord Lumley and Joan his wife, eldest daughter of the earl, to a certain Reginald Howse. Some years later Robert Howse, who seems to have been a son of Reginald, sold it to William Dodington, from which date it descended with Breamore.

Historically, Godshill village was a tithing of Fordingbridge parish. The population of the village in the mid-19th century was around 100 people, although census counts in the 19th century are somewhat variable because Godshill Wood was often used as a Gypsy camp. It is related that Gypsy women used to go alone to a particular holly tree in a sheltered spot along Godshill Ridge to give birth.

In 1868 a new civil parish called Ashley Walk was created, which incorporated much of what is now the eastern half of the current parishes of Godshill and Hyde; the new parish did not include Godshill village, which remained part of Fordingbridge. The civil parish of Ashley Walk lasted until 1932.

To the west of the village is the estate known as Sandy Balls, which is now a holiday park owned by the Westlake family. Before World War II, Sandy Balls was the headquarters of the Scouting-like movement known as the Order of Woodcraft Chivalry.
