= Matthew De Abaitua =

British writer

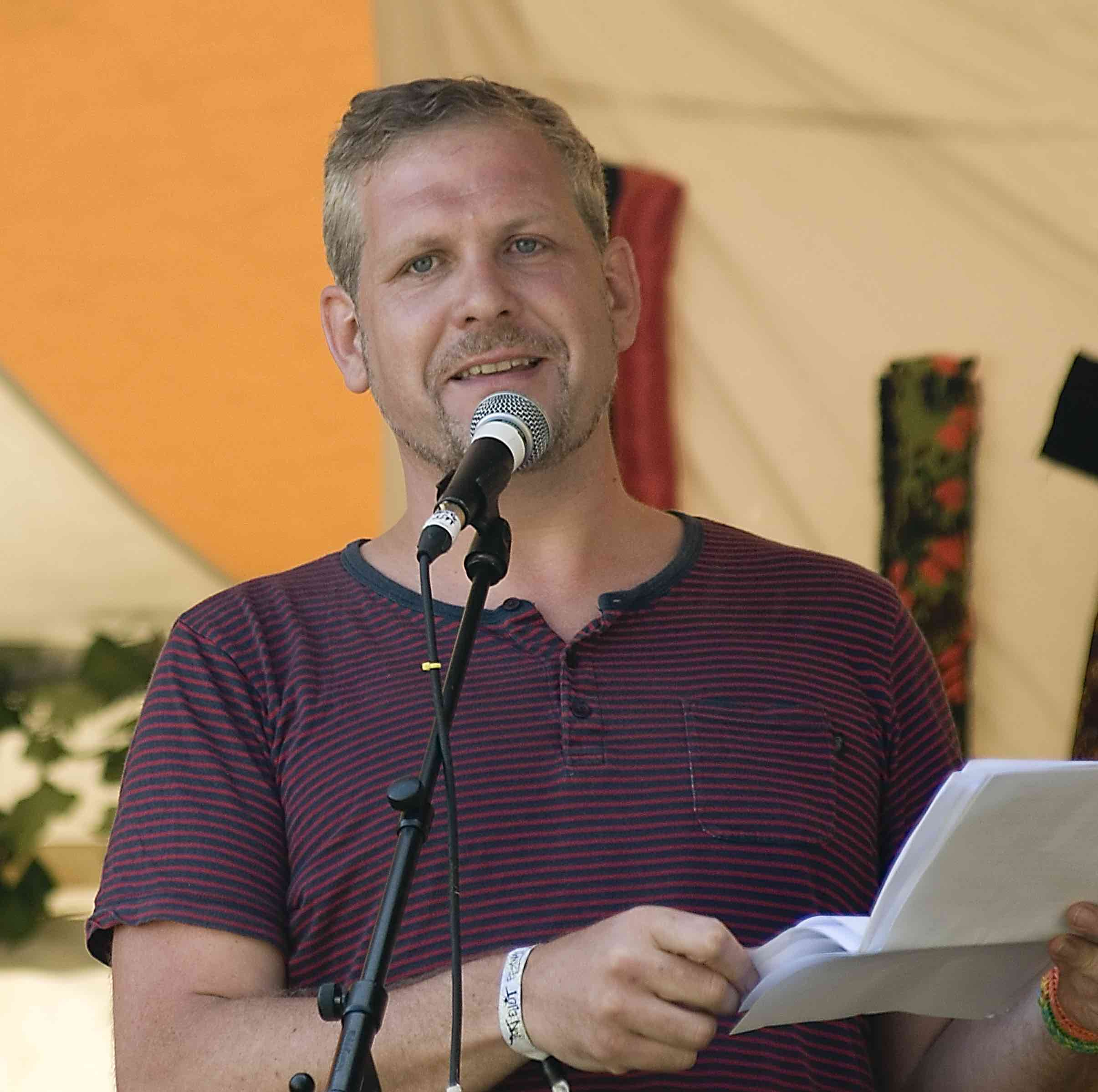
Matthew De Abaitua reading at Port Eliot Festival

Matthew De Abaitua (born 1971) is a British writer. He is a lecturer in Creative Writing at the University of Essex.

== Biography ==
De Abaitua was born in Ormskirk, Liverpool and grew up in Maghull in Merseyside. He was educated at Deyes High Comprehensive. He studied English literature at the University of York and was awarded a British Academy grant to study the creative writing master's degree at the University of East Anglia.

Between July 1994 and January 1995, he lived with the author Will Self in a cottage in Knodishall, Suffolk. He worked as an amanuensis to Self. His transcript of an interview between Will Self and J. G. Ballard was published in Will Self's collection of journalism, Junk Mail (Bloomsbury, 1995). He recounted the story of this whole period in his 2018 literary memoir Self & I, which was described as "erudite yet hilarious" by The Observer and was shortlisted for the New Angle Prize.

He was Deputy Editor of The Idler magazine from 1995-1999. His short story "Inbetween" was published in the bestselling anthology of rave fiction, Disco Biscuits. He adapted the story into a short film script that was filmed and broadcast by Channel 4 in 1999. In 2001, he wrote and presented SF:UK, a low-budget documentary series on the history of science fiction for Channel 4.

He was editor of Channel 4's film website and producer of the Film4 show Movie Rush. His debut novel The Red Men was shortlisted for the Arthur C. Clarke Award in 2008. Directors Shynola adapted the first chapter of The Red Men into a short film called Dr. Easy, produced by Film4 and Warp Films. His second novel IF THEN (Angry Robot, 2015) explored the use of social monitoring and algorithms to replace market mechanisms in the administration of the British town of Lewes. The novel also drew upon the First World War experiences of science fiction writer Olaf Stapledon, mathematician Lewis Fry Richardson, philosopher Pierre Teilhard De Chardin and John Hargrave, the founder of the radical interwar camping movement The Kindred of the Kibbo Kift. His third novel, The Destructives (Angry Robot, 2016), completes this loose trilogy of science fiction novels on consciousness and artificial intelligence. After the publication of his history and memoir The Art of Camping: The History and Practice of Sleeping Under the Stars (Hamish Hamilton, 2011), he appeared on Radio 4's The Today Programme, erecting a tent with Evan Davis. The Art of Camping was chosen as one of The Economist's Books of the Year.

== Novels ==
- The Red Men, Snowbooks, 2007, Gollancz, 2014, Angry Robot, 2017
- IF THEN, Angry Robot, 2015
- The Destructives, Angry Robot, 2016

== Non-fiction ==
- Self & I: A Memoir of Literary Ambition, Eye Books, 2018
- The Art of Camping: The History and Practice of Sleeping Under the Stars, Hamish Hamilton, 2011
- The Idler's Companion: An anthology of Lazy Literature, 4th Estate, 1996
