= Woodcraft (youth movement) =

Woodcraft is a recreational/educational program devised by Ernest Thompson Seton in 1902, for young people based on camping, outdoor skills, and woodcrafts. Thompson Seton's Woodcraft ideas were incorporated into the early Scout movement, but also in many other organisations in many countries. Seton also established the Woodcraft League of America as the United States branch of the movement.

== United States ==
Formally established in Los Angeles in 1922, the largest and most active Woodcraft organization is Los Angeles' Woodcraft Rangers, which has a history of providing programs for children in the under-served areas of greater Los Angeles. Currently, Woodcraft Rangers reaches out to over 18,000 at-risk young people annually through enriching after-school and camping programs. The organization's programs are responsive to social trends and designed to help children mature into healthy, productive adults through positive experiences and age-appropriate challenges. Over the decades Woodcraft Rangers have modified Seton's original emphasis on outdoor life to incorporate activities that meet the needs of an increasingly urban population, but the goal of changing behavior and encouraging positive outcomes through interaction and education remains central to what they do today. By providing structured activities, a safe environment, and adult guidance after school, Woodcraft Rangers offers a positive alternative to the boredom and negative peer pressures that can lead to juvenile delinquency. As it has since Seton's time, the agency's American Camp Association accredited summer camp programs at Blue Sky Meadow focus on outdoor living skills and nature activities. Campers are encouraged to explore and test their strengths and build character in a safe and supportive environment. After participating in nature hikes, archery, scavenger hunts, map & compass adventures, arts & crafts, survival skills games and star-gazing, campers return home with a better understanding of the outdoor world and greater confidence in their abilities. Summer camp also provides an opportunity for kids to just be kids – to have fun while forging lifelong friendships, developing important skills, and discovering new interests.

== Europe ==
In the United Kingdom, Quaker Ernest Westlake founded the Order of Woodcraft Chivalry in 1916. The OWC is the main, family-oriented group that holds activities and camps throughout the year in several Lodges. John Hargrave broke away from the OWC to found the Kindred of the Kibbo Kift. Another of the active, surviving UK organisations is the Woodcraft Folk, a socialist group originally affiliated with the Co-Operative movement that broke away from Kibbo Kift in the 1920s. They hold weekly meetings similar to Scouts. Another breakaway from the OWC, Forest Schools, revived after World War II to form Forest School Camps taking urban children into country areas in the UK.

Many groups were founded elsewhere in Europe in the inter-war years. Typical was the Czech Woodcraft League, founded in the 1920s by Milos Seifert; it grew in its early years but was suppressed for half a century, first by the Nazis and then by the Communists. It survived by guile and misdirection, emerging with the fall of Communism, a small but dedicated organisation with members of all ages.

== See also ==
- Scoutcraft
- Bushcraft
