= Frankenbury Camp =

Iron Age hillfort in Hampshire, England

- Godmanes Cap Camp
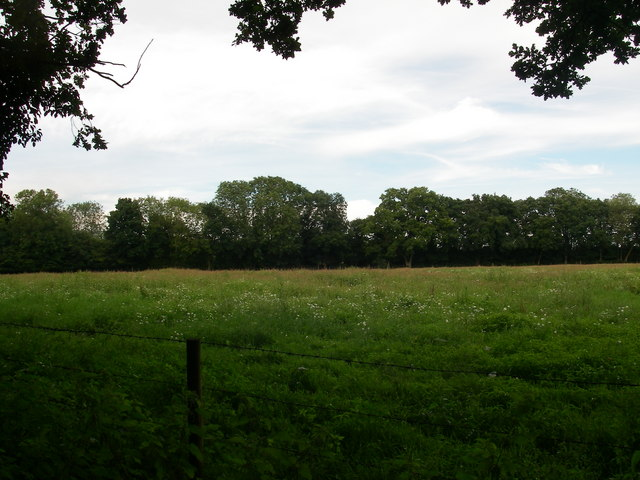

- Location within Hampshire
- 50.9363°N 1.7633°W
- Periods: Iron Age
- Location: Hampshire

Site notes
- Area: 11 acres (4.5 ha)
- Public access: No

Frankenbury Camp is the site of an Iron Age univallate hillfort located in Hampshire. The site is on a very slight promontory overlooking the Avon Valley on the north-western edge of the New Forest. The fort encloses approximately 11 acres. It has very steep natural slopes on the west and south sides. The northeast sides are defended by a simple rampart and ditch. The original entrance on the southeast corner has since been widened. It is listed as a scheduled ancient monument no.122. The site is currently pasture, and part of Folds Farm, for the most part, although the earthworks themselves are lined with trees and the south and western parts are now encroached by woodland. Various archaeological relics have been found in the area:

Iron Age/Roman Pottery:

- At a permanent caravan site in an old gravel pit grid reference SU165142
- Located east of caravan site in old gravel pit.grid reference SU165142
- On farmland east of Criddlestyle grid reference SU161142.
- Garden Cottage, Godshill. Located behind the cottage.grid reference SU174149
- Located north west of Mews Hill Copsegrid reference SU165142

Iron Age Coins

- Durotrigian Silver Stater found in garden of Ambridge, Tinker's Cross, 1969.grid reference SU142158

Roman Coins:

- Found behind either Redlands or Garden Cottage, Godshill grid reference SU174149
- Located in the garden of Avon Lodge. 1930. A coin of Constantine 306-337 A.D grid reference SU153141

The artefacts are now in Salisbury Museum.

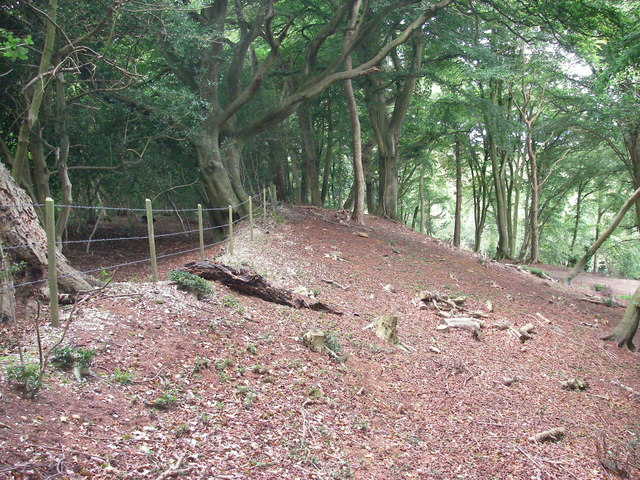
The southern ramparts, which form the boundary of the Sandy Balls estate.

== Location ==
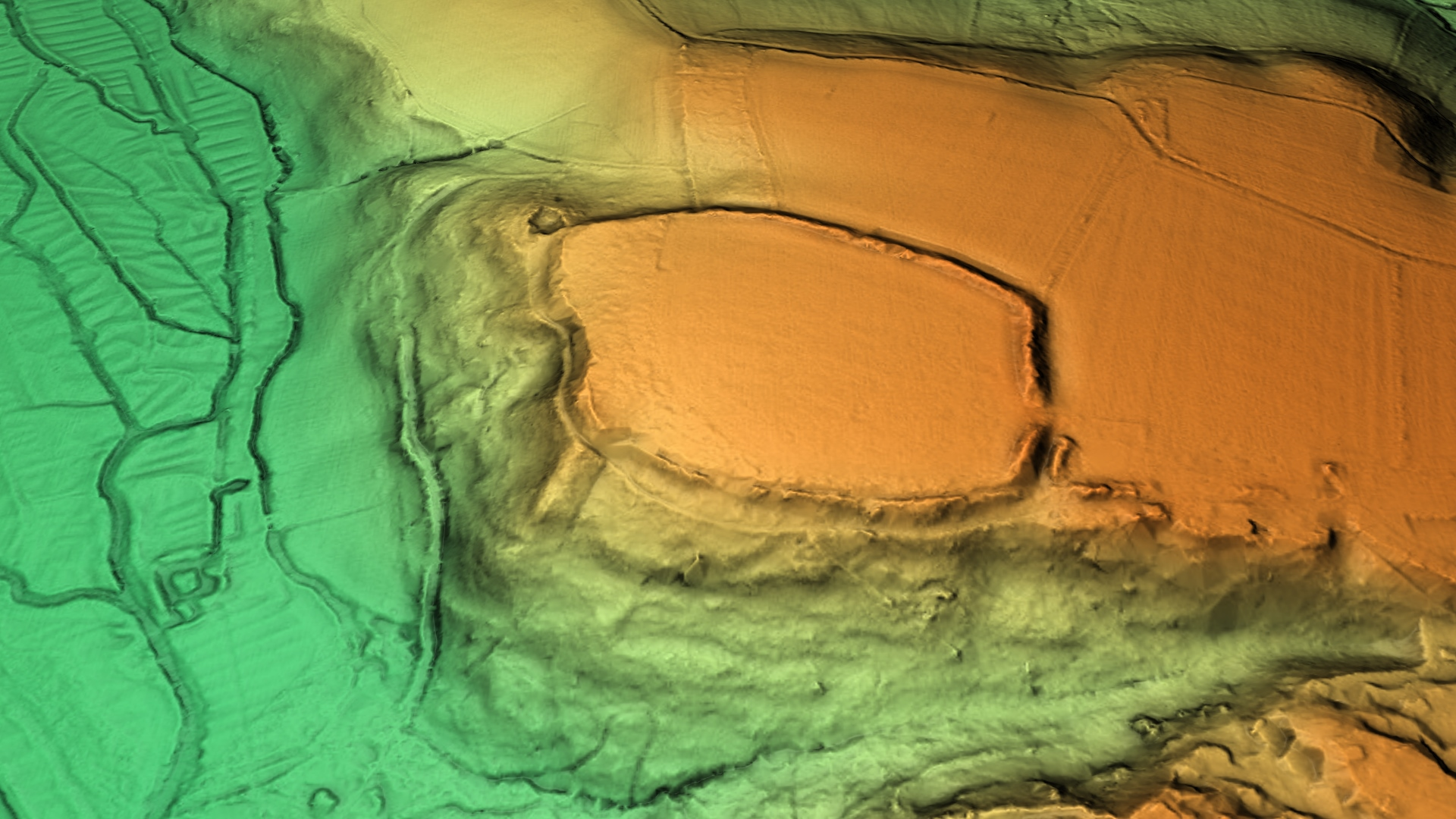
3D view of the digital terrain model

The site is located at grid reference SU167152, and lies between Godshill and Fordingbridge, in the county of Hampshire. Immediately to the South lies the Sandy Balls estate. The hill has a summit of 70m AOD.
