= Ellsworth Jaeger =

American naturalist (1897–1962)

Ellsworth Jaeger (October 18, 1897 – August 7, 1962) was an American naturalist and author.

He was a staff member at the Buffalo Museum of Science in Buffalo, New York.

== Biography ==
Jaeger was born on October 18, 1897 in Buffalo, New York. When he was nine years old, he wrote a letter to naturalist Ernest Thompson Seton, who founded the Woodcraft League of America, which he received a response to. As a boy, he would go on to help start the chapter of the Woodcraft League in Buffalo.

Jaeger graduated from Masten Park High School. He attended Buffalo Fine Arts Academy, paying for his education by working an open-hearth furnace at Bethlehem Steel.

After completing his education, Jaeger worked commercial artist, doing drawings for Acme Steel and street car advertising for Barron G Collier.

Jaeger became a leader in the Woodcrafters, turning the Buffalo group into one of the most prominent in the United States. He then became the field director of Woodcrafters for the northeastern states.

In 1929, Jaeger joined the faculty at the Buffalo Museum of Science in Buffalo when it opened. In 1933, he joined the board of managers for the museum. In 1941, he became the museum's education curator. In 1948, he visited and reviewed the adult-education facilities in American museums for the United Nations Educational, Scientific and Cultural Organization (UNESCO). In 1951, he became the Saturday morning host of Your Museum of Science, a television program on WBEN-TV.

From 1934 to 1939, Jaeger wrote Wonder Trails, a daily syndicated newspaper column that appeared in thirteen newspapers in the United States and Canada. Each day, he would feature a drawing of an animal along with text detailing its behavior and ecology. In 1967, a collection of the pieces were published as a 48 page paperback. He published articles and drawings in numerous publications including Natural History and Better Homes & Gardens.

Jaeger was well-versed in the traditions of many Native American tribes. He spent twelve summers of his life living with tribes in Canada and the American Southwest. He was an expert on animal foot prints and animal calls. He lectured on the topics and performed the calls, including in one lecture series he called "A Canadian Woodland Symphony.'

Jaeger's books, which were illustrated with pen and ink drawings, focussed on woodcraft and Indian lore. They harkened back to the heyday of young men's interest in the subjects in the early 20th century, when they were popularized by Dan Beard and Ernest Thompson Seton, who guided "young imaginations" in an "innocent pursuit of the primitive." This era, according to one writer, came to an end in the 1910s "when the call to war and the mysteries of electronics and the internal combustion engine" changed their interests.

== Awards and honors ==
In 1938, Jaeger was named a "great naturalist of the North" by the Manitoba Natural History Society. In 1952, he was elected fellow of the Rochester Museum of Arts and Sciences. In 1954, he received the Luther Gulick Award from the Campfire Girls of America for his work training leaders and counselors.

== Personal life ==
Jaeger's wife, Zetta was an art teacher and occupational therapist. She was an expert in the folklore of Southwestern Native Americans.

Jaeger died on August 7, 1962 at Buffalo General Hospital.

== Books ==
- How to Camp Out If You're Bombed Out (1942)
- Wildwood Wisdom (Macmillan, 1946)
- Easy Crafts (Macmillan, 1947)
- Council Fires (Macmillan, 1948)
- Tracks and Trailcraft (Macmillan, 1948)
- Nature Crafts (Macmillan, 1949)
- Land and Water Trails (Macmillan, 1953)
- Woodsmoke (Macmillan, 1953)
