= Sandy Balls =

Woodland in Hampshire, England

Coordinates: 50.9319°N 1.7581°W

Sandy Balls is 120 acres (49 hectares) of woods and parkland near the New Forest in Hampshire, England. Located between the village of Godshill and the town of Fordingbridge, it is bounded on the western edge by the River Avon. It is run as a holiday centre, and in 2017 it was acquired by Away Resorts.

The first Sandy Balls logo

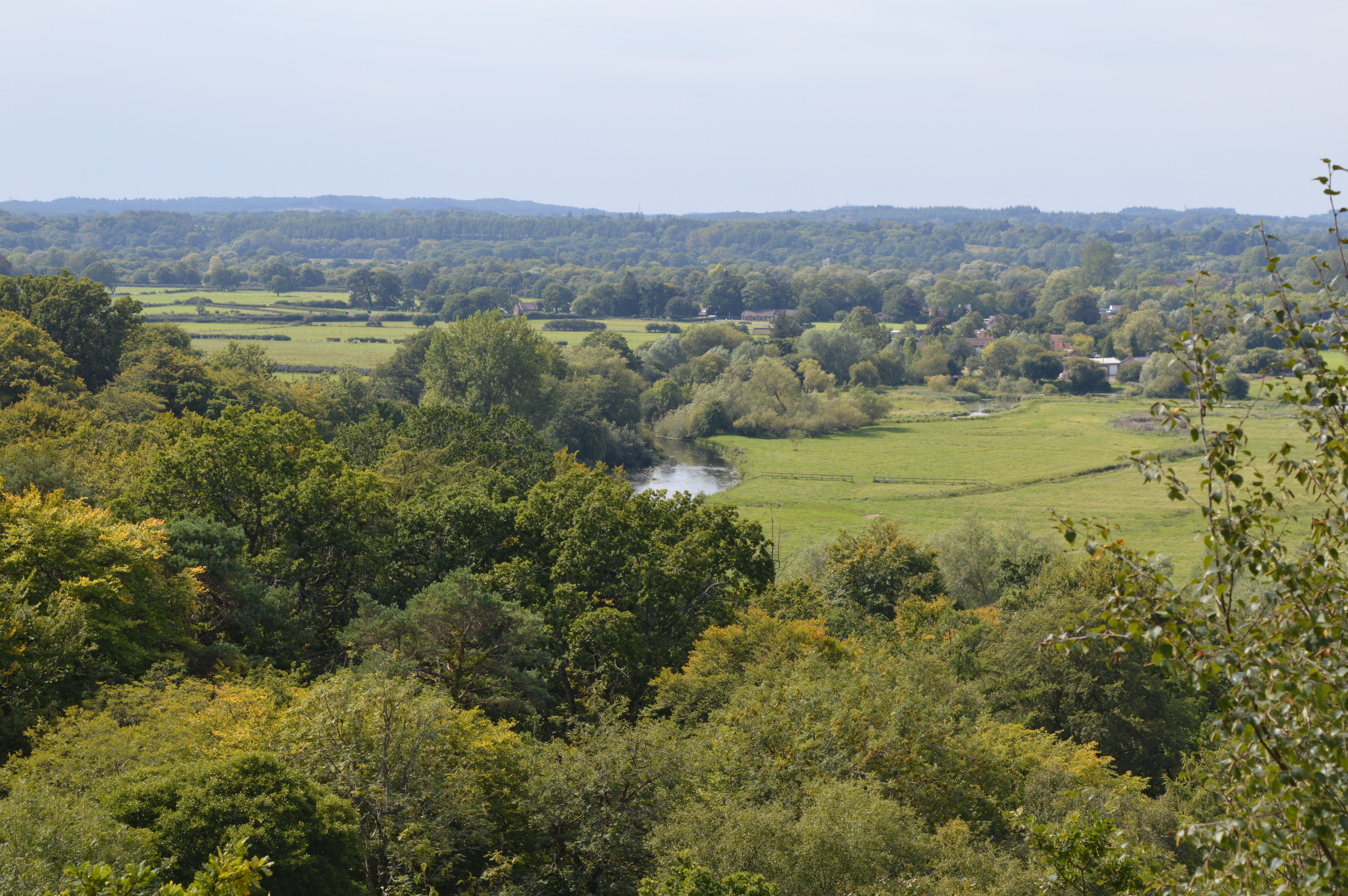
View from Good Friday Hill

== Name ==
The estate's name has been traced as far back as the reign of Henry VII (1485 – 1509). It appeared on maps and other documents of the time as "Sandyballas," which is the description given to the dome-shaped sand and gravel outcrops on the western boundary of the site. Many of these outcrops remain, including ones called Good Friday Hill and Giant's Grave.

Due to the estate's name having a humorous sound in Modern English colloquial usage, Sandy Balls has been used in various jokes and comedies.

On the comedy panel show Have I Got News For You, guest host Alexander Armstrong introduced a promotional video for Sandy Balls that made fun of the resort's name.

== History ==
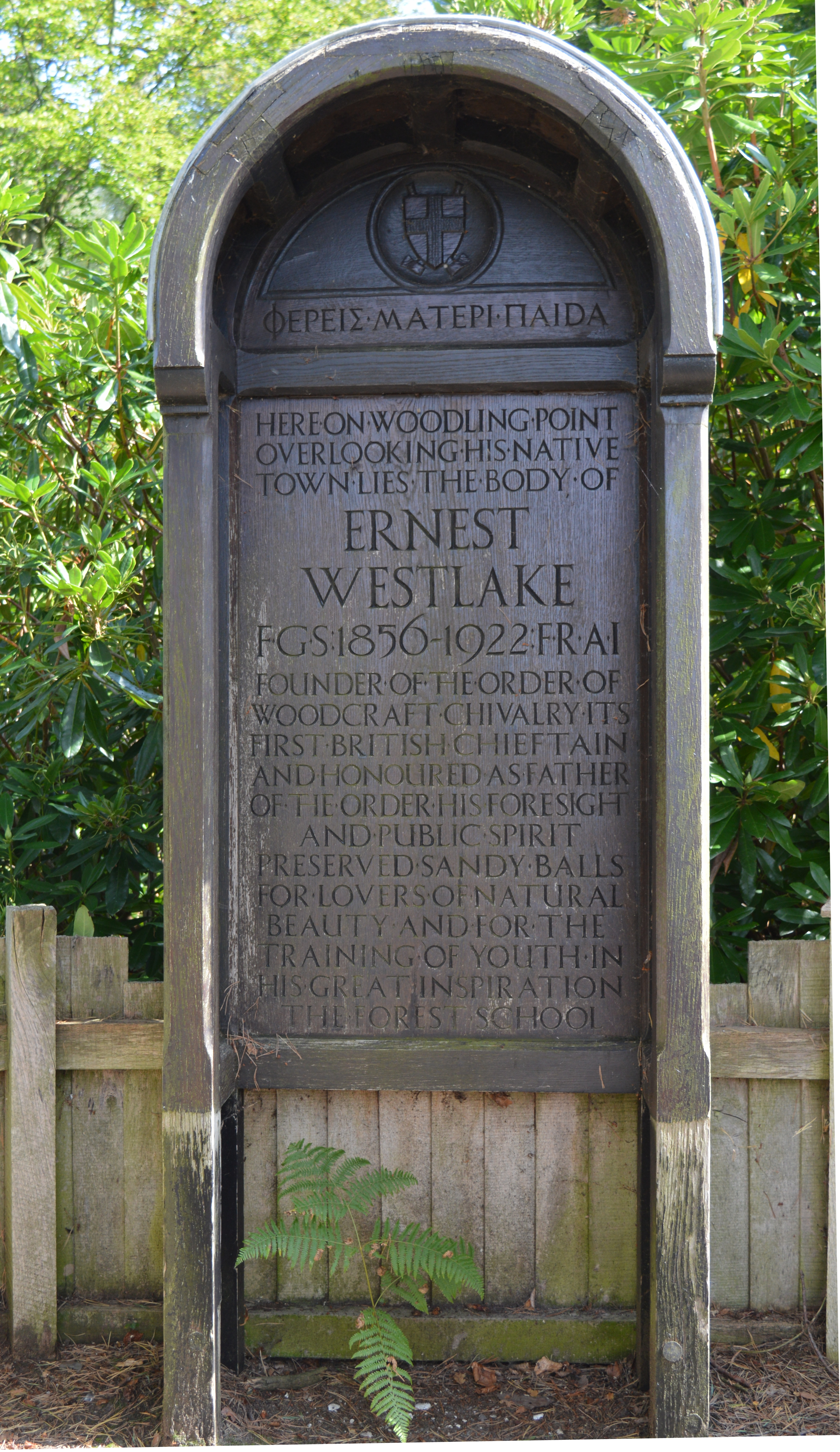
Grave of Ernest Westlake on a path to the River Avon

In 1919 the estate came up for sale to pay for death duties which arose on the death of Sir Edward Hulse in the first World War. Ernest Westlake, an anthropologist stimulated by the ideas and work of Ernest Thompson Seton bought the land as a site for his newly formed youth movement the Order of Woodcraft Chivalry. After the death of Ernest his son Aubrey Westlake carried on his ideas and the forerunner of Forest School Camps was established. The first Head master was Cuthbert Rutter, Aubrey's cousin.

The estate also served as a home for Grith Fyrd during the 1930s.

=== Development into a holiday centre ===
In 1934, 12 simply furnished camping huts were built and next year the first brochure was produced, entitled "Sandy Balls for the Beauty Spot Holiday". As the original aim of Aubrey Westlake was to use the location to provide a simple, low cost holiday for families, the original cabins were placed among the trees.

=== War years ===
During the war the estate served as temporary accommodation for evacuees and for families whose main bread winner was on active service. A large air raid shelter was built and a Red Cross post established.

=== Continued development ===
Through the 1950s and 1960s the Westlake family continued the location's development as a holiday centre. Accommodations were greatly extended and a restaurant and shop were added (with the latter two locations using produce grown on the estate).

In the 1980s the holiday centre was extensively developed and modernised by Richard Westlake.

In 2007 a major redevelopment was carried out, making the central area into a piazza and adding the bistro restaurant and adding new retail spaces including the bike hire shop. A new reception building was built with a roof covered with sedums and other plants.

In 2017 the Westlake family sold the estate to Away Resorts Limited.

== Environment ==
The area has a wide range of wildlife and approximately 75% of the site is covered with vegetation which has been very carefully managed to allow native species to flourish. A steep path runs down to the River Avon.
