= Millican Dalton =

British adventurer

Millican Dalton (20 April 1867 – 5 February 1947) was a British self-styled "Professor of Adventure".

== Biography ==
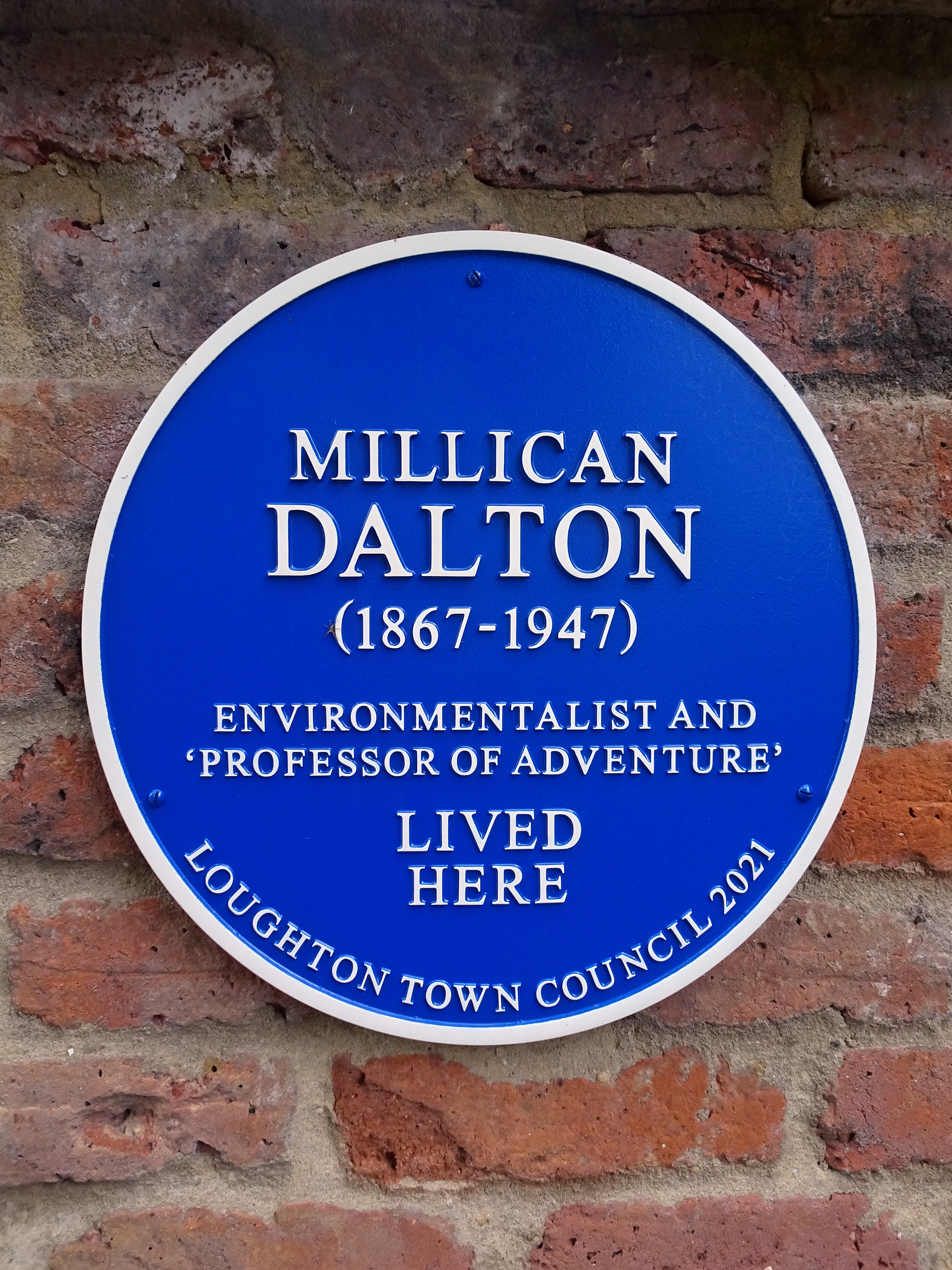
Blue plaque placed by Loughton Town Council on Dalton's home

Born on 20 April 1867 at Nenthead, Alston, Cumberland, Dalton spent his early life in the northwest of England before his family moved to Essex. He became an insurance clerk in London, living in Loughton where he owned a cottage, and slept under canvas in the garden, but at the age of 36, he gave up this existence and went to live in a rough wooden shack, and in a cave (which he dubbed "The Cave Hotel") in Borrowdale, from where he offered camping and adventure holidays, as reported in the BBC's Countryfile programme broadcast on 20 September 2015. He latterly spent his summers in the cave, moving south to the wooden shed in Buckinghamshire during the colder months. Loughton Town Council resolved in 2021 to erect a blue plaque to him on the house he lived in the garden of, Walnut Cottage, Stony Path.

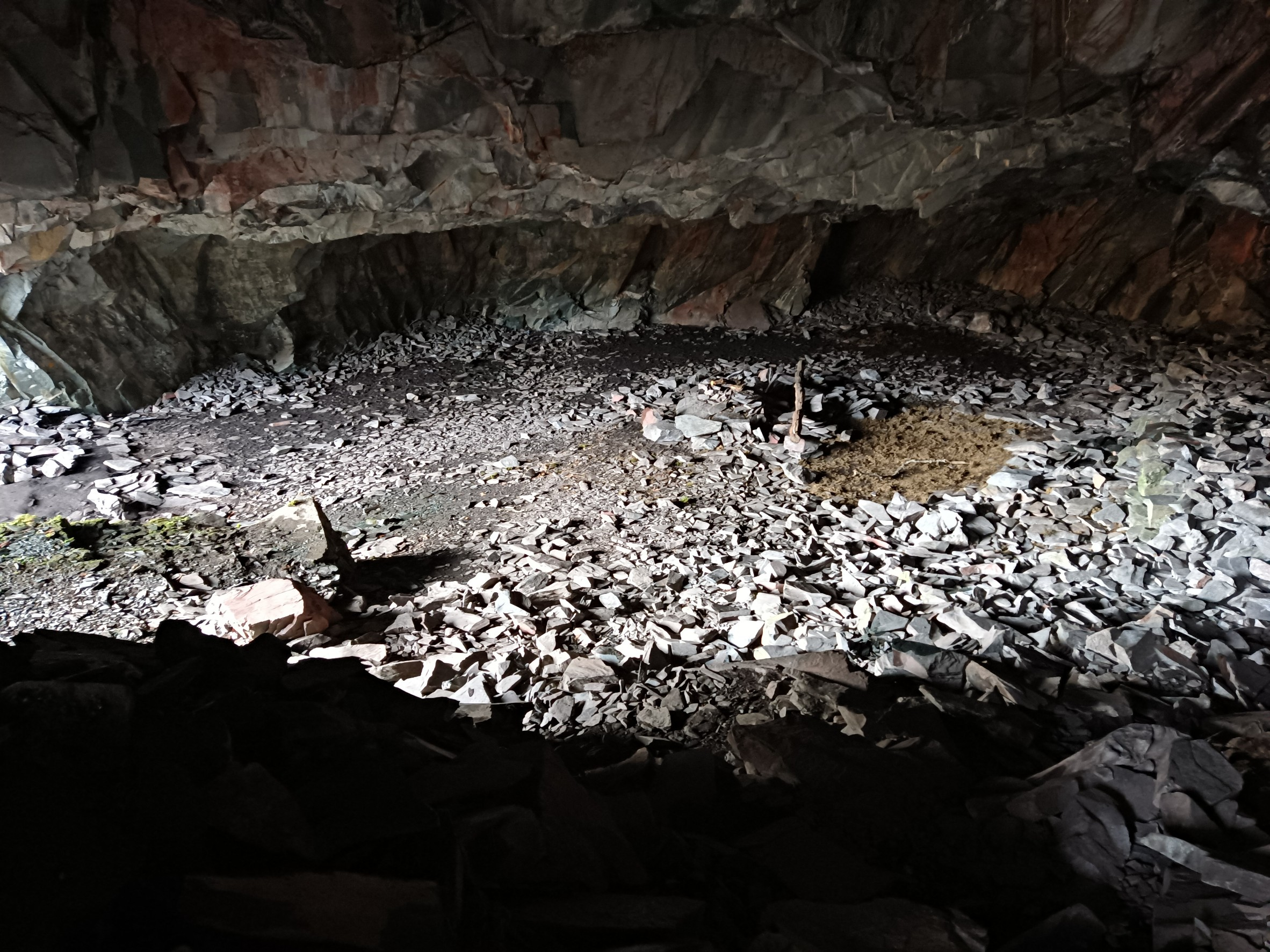
View of large "living room" from small "bedroom" of "The Cave Hotel".

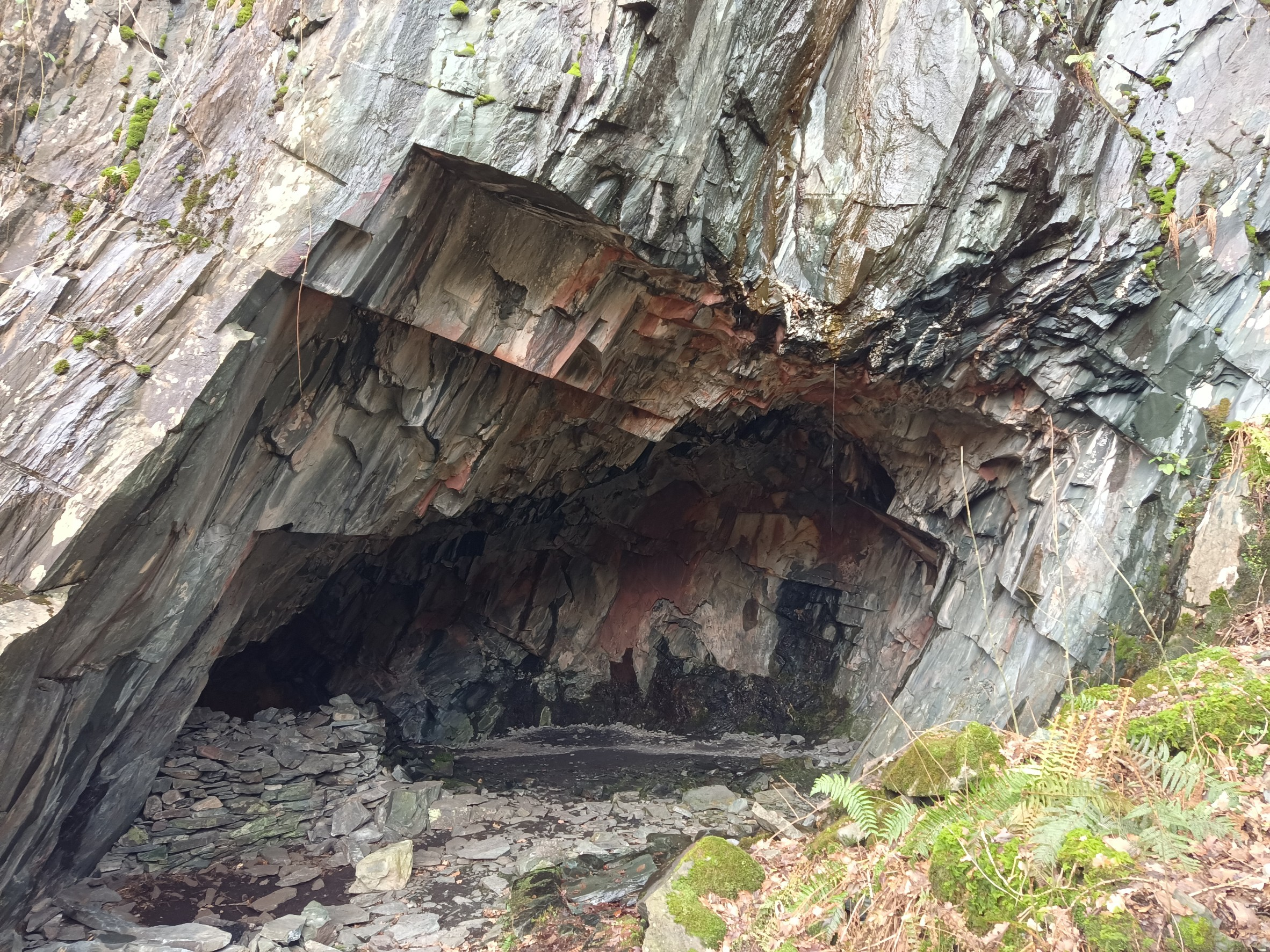
Entrance to "bedroom" area. The inscription can be seen low down on the left hand wall at the entrance.

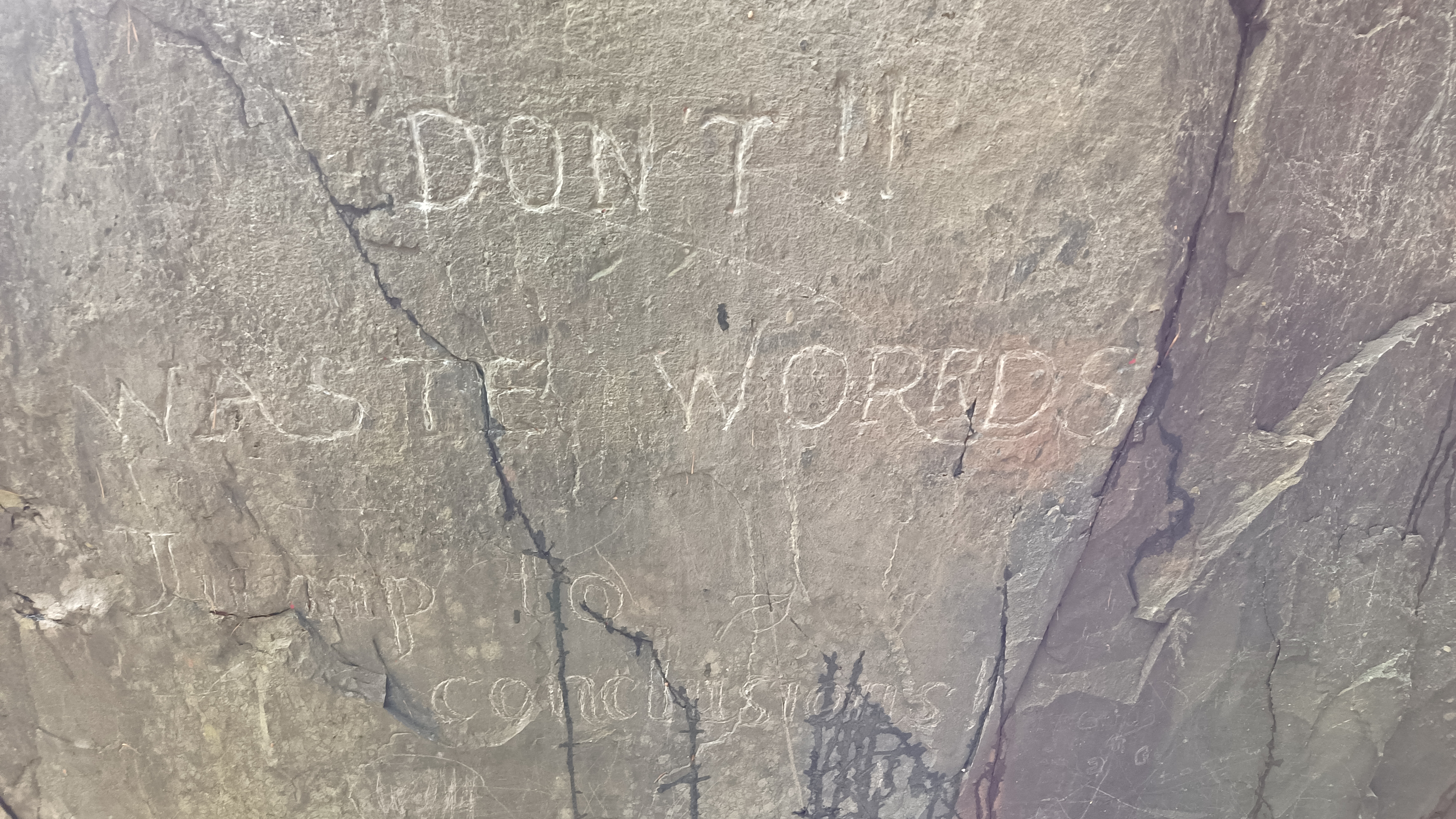
Inscription at entrance to "bedroom", above and to right of main entrance, to "living room".

During the winter of 1946–47, Dalton's hut burned down, so he moved into a tent. This harsh winter was too much for his 79-year-old body, and he contracted pneumonia, of which he died in Amersham Hospital on 5 February 1947.

== Cave ==
Millican Dalton's Cave, as it is locally known, is on the eastern flank of Castle Crag and consists of two inter-connected split-level caves formed by the slate quarrying process. This cave was inhabited for nigh-on fifty years by Dalton. To this day, evidence of Dalton's existence can be seen in the upper chamber of the cave, where a carving on the caverns wall warns visitors "Don't Waste Worrds (sic), Jump to Conclusions". It is widely assumed that Millican Dalton carved this phrase, but M. D. Entwistle states in his book ‘Millican Dalton: A Search for Romance & Freedom’ (Mountainmere Research, 2022, second edition) that it was actually punched into the rock by a Scottish friend during a raging argument. The misspelling of words was to reflect a rolling ‘R’. This phrase held relevance to the argument as Millican often told his friend “Don’t waste words,” or “Don’t jump to conclusions.”

== Personal life ==
An alternative lifestyler long before the term was created, Dalton was a vegetarian, pacifist and teetotaller – lived off his wits, surviving on a small income as a climbing guide. Dalton believed that man could live by bread alone, with slight adjustments to suit his individual taste. Dalton cooked his own food and remained a vegetarian until his death in 1947.
