= Forest School Camps =

British non-profit organization

- Forest School Camps' logo
- Abbreviation: FSC
- Formation: 1930-1945
- Registration no.: Charity No. 306006
- Headquarters: Haddenham, Ely, Cambridgeshire
- Region served: United Kingdom
- Budget: Non-profit
- Website: www.fsc.org.uk

Forest School Camps (FSC) is an organization primarily aimed at children between the ages of 6 and 17. FSC runs camps throughout the year, with the main ones lasting 13 nights during late July and August, and additional one-week and weekend camps at Easter and during the spring and early summer.

As a volunteer-run organization, FSC relies on cultural and social bonds, as well as enthusiasm of participants, for support and staffing rather than monetary incentive. Many volunteers have 'grown up' in the organisation. FSC aims to provide accsess to camping and outdoors to children who may not otherwise, and improve their survival and social skills

FSC is an English charity registered with the Charity Commission for England and Wales in the United Kingdom, number 306006.

== Culture and history ==
FSC was originally formed in 1947 by a group of former students and teachers from a radical educational scheme called "Forest School" that started in 1930 in the New Forest. The school later moved to Whitwell Hall in Norfolk, but the building was requisitioned at the start of World War II, forcing the school to close.

Forest School had connections with a diverse range of cultures, such as the Woodcraft movement, Native Americans cultures, and the Quakers. FSC has since developed its own distinct culture with unique traditions and internal practices. Many of the traditions have developed out of physical necessity, such as Rally (a meeting of everyone on the Camp where they discuss what is going to happen through the day), Clan (a vertical age sub-group of the lodge that prepares the meals for the day), and the Arise song. Other traditions, such as Merrymoot, or the Camp Songs, sprang from cultural and aesthetic bases. The camp songs are sung round a big campfire and are a great way to have fun and a bit of a laugh.

The end of a main standing camp is usually marked by two major events, Merrymoot and Lodge Common Council.

Merrymoot is an expanded campfire session where the whole camp gathers to entertain one another with sketches improvisations, and traditional songs.

Lodge Common Council is a formal occasion, usually on the final night, where the entire camp gathers around a special fire. This fire is traditionally octagonal in shape and may be as high as five feet, though it is more commonly rectangular in practice. Before lighting the fire, a few coals from the previous year are added, and it is then lit in front of the whole body of the camp.

Once the fire is burning, campers review the camp and may suggest changes in activities or emphasis for the following year.

== Groups ==
People on camp have traditionally been separated into the following groups, although some experimental camps have varied this arrangement:

Pixies - Children who are too young to go alone and must be accompanied by a parent or relative
Elves - Children between the ages of 6 and a half and 8.
Woodlings - Children between the ages of 9 and 11.
Trailseekers - Children between the ages of 12 and 13.
Trackers - Children between the ages of 14 and 15.
Pathfinders - Children between the ages of 16 and 17.
Pixie parents- Parent or guardian looking after a pixie.
Waywardens - Adults who require support due to disabilities.
Staff - Adults who care for the children and co-operatively run the whole camp. With the exception of camp chiefs (who are in overall charge of the entire camp) and caterers (responsible for food), staff are split into groups that look after the different age groups. In each group there is also a group chief.

Generally FSC age groups are based on school year rather than birthday. As most camps take place before September, this means it is possible to have campers whose ages do not exactly fit with the groupings listed above (e.g. 15-year-old Pathfinders).

From 2007, as a trial, the age groups have been amended slightly (to those given above), increasing the age range slightly in the lower groups, and reducing it for the pathfinders, to allow the camps to accommodate slightly more older children without distorting the number in each age group. As a high percentage of children who begin camping with FSC fall in love with camp and want to stay on until their final year, when they participate in a coming of age ceremony, when the pathfinder age group previously encompassed ages 15, 16 and 17, there were always more applications from pathfinders than spaces for them to fill. The change in age groups has compensated for this and now more children are able to continue camping into their final year.

== Camps ==
Each camp has a different agenda and model, set by tradition and the Camp Chief. There are several different identifiable types:

Standing camps

These are set in regularly used locations, at sites generally used for many years, and where a relationship has been built up with the landowners. Sites may be on remote hill farms among mountainous country, or on land in lowland areas. Most camps are in this format and children need to attend at least 2 of these camps to experience FSC life before being able to try activity camps as below. A variety of standard and novel activities take place on these camps, and they can be exciting and challenging, but they are less demanding physically than some of the mobile and activity camps. They may have a theme or special interest depending on the interests of the camp leaders and staff.

Both basic and more advanced camping skills are learnt during Standing Camps, particularly during the first part of the camp. These skills are consolidated by the 'hike', during which each age group walks with its staff away from the site for two, three or four nights, taking just their essential camping gear with them. The distance travelled and the time away from the main camp depend on the age of the children in the group.

Mobile camps

These camps generally do not have a single fixed campsite. They move on most days and are based around walking in lowland or mountain environments, cycling, canoeing or other activities. Whilst most mobiles are based in the United Kingdom some are based abroad

Semi-mobile camps

Semi-mobiles are essentially Mobiles, however may either have a site on which they spend a period of time before beginning the journey or have a fixed location (often known as a base camp) from which small trips are made most days.

Caving camps

These camps are usually based in a caving hut with day adventures out into local caves. These camps often include a day of overground exploration. Recent camps have taken place in parts of the UK such as the Mendips, Devon, Yorkshire and South Wales. Caving camps are often described by those who frequent them as part of the "real heart of FSC", with the same people attending them year after year, and strong friendships being built up.

Conservation and Skills camps

These are a special form of standing camps focused on a particular work project, usually an environmental project of some sort. These camps restricted to over 16s or over 18s depending on their nature and leaders.

Associate Camps

These are run and organised by FSC associates, usually parents of child campers, but can also include staff from children's camps. They are generally shorter weekend camps, and do not follow exactly the same structure as standard child camps, but are similar in ethos and are open to family groups, children are cared for by their own parents/guardians rather than staff.

== FSC Glee ==
Part of FSC camps is communal singing and sharing of traditional and contemporary songs. A campfire is often held in the evening where people are encouraged to sing. FSC song books are also printed every few years, these contain some of the more common songs sung on camps. A virtual version of these books is available at the FSC glee website. A few songs unique to FSC such as the Pole Tax song have been written by members and remain part of the oral tradition.

== Collections ==
The historical records of the Forest School Camps are held in University College London's Special Collections (which include archives belonging to the Institute of Education). They were transferred to the Institute in 2005; additional material was acquired in the same year.
