= Ruth B. Clark =

American politician from Colorado

Ruth B. Clark was a state legislator in Colorado, United States. She represented Larimer County in the Colorado House of Representatives from 1955-1966. Clark was a Republican.

She married and had children. She lived in Fort Collins.

She and John Mackle introduced a bill to abolish the death penalty.

Getty Images has a photograph of her from 1964.
