= Ruth Colvin Clark =

American born Educational Psychologist

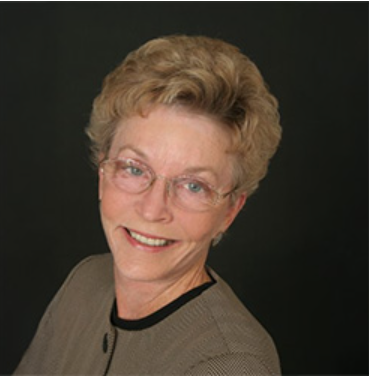
- Born: July 30, 1943 (age 83)
- Education: Immaculate Heart College, University of California, Los Angeles
- Alma mater: University of Southern California (PhD)
- Occupation: Educational psychologist

Ruth Colvin Clark (born July 30, 1943) is an American born educational psychologist, known for the pedagogical theory of the "Four Architectures of Instruction" and the value of learning by doing.

== Early life and education ==
Clark received a bachelor's degree in biology and chemistry from Immaculate Heart College in 1964. She later attended the University of California, Los Angeles, where she earned her master's degree in biological chemistry from the Department of Biology in 1966. She later obtained a doctorate in educational psychology and instructional technology from the University of Southern California in the mid-1980s.

== Career ==
Clark spent five years as a training manager for Southern California Edison before launching CLARK Training & Consulting, where she served as the principal and president of the organization.

She is most known for her work in the field of instructional design and technical training, studying the translation of academic research into evidence-based practitioner standards. She wrote a 2003 textbook with Richard Mayer, e-Learning and the Science of Instruction, and a 2010 guidebook on Evidence-based Training Methods, which remained in print through several editions.

Clark is a former president of the International Society for Performance Improvement, and received their Professional Achievement Award in 2006. She spoke widely about educational design and learning theory, and worked closely with the Association for Talent Development and other organizations serving the learning development community.

== Selected publications ==
=== Books ===
Clark published a number of textbooks and teaching guides, including:

- Clark, R. C. (1989). Developing Technical Training: A structured approach for developing classroom and computer-based instructional materials. Addison-Wesley.
- Clark, R. C. (1998). Building Expertise: Cognitive methods for training and performance improvement. ISPI.
- Clark, R. C., & Mayer, R. E. (2003). e-Learning and the Science of Instruction. Jossey-Bass/Pfeiffer. Later editions picked up by Wiley (5th Ed. 2023).
- Clark, R. C., & Lyons, C. (2004). Graphics for Learning. Pfeiffer.
- Clark, R. C. (2010). Evidence-based Training Methods: A guide for training professionals. ASTD Press.
- Clark, R. C. (2012). Scenario-based e-Learning. Pfeiffer.

=== Articles and other publications ===
- Clark, R. C. (1998). Four instructional architectures. In Building expertise: Cognitive methods for training and performance improvement. ISPI.
- Clark, R. C. (2002). Six Principles of Effective e-Learning. The eLearning developers Journal. The Learning Guild.
- Clark, R. C., & Mayer, R. E (2008). Learning by viewing versus learning by doing. Performance Improvement, 47(9)
