= Social Credit Party of Great Britain and Northern Ireland =

- Leader: John Hargrave
- Founded: 1932
- Dissolved: 1951
- Preceded by: Kibbo Kift
- Succeeded by: Social Credit Political League
- Newspaper: Attack
- Paramilitary wing: Green Shirts
- Ideology: Social Credit; Agrarianism
- Political position: Syncretic
- Colours: Green and White

The Social Credit Party of Great Britain and Northern Ireland was a political party in the United Kingdom. It grew out of the Kibbo Kift, which was established in 1920 as a more craft-based alternative for youth to the Boy Scouts.

== Development ==
The organisation was led by John Hargrave, who gradually turned the movement into a paramilitary movement for social credit. With its supporters wearing a political uniform of green shirts, in 1932 it became known as the Green Shirt Movement for Social Credit and in 1935 it took its final name, the Social Credit Party. At this point C. H. Douglas, the originator of Social Credit and the ideological leader of the group, disavowed the Greenshirts as he did not support the establishment of a political party based on his ideas. The party published the newspaper Attack and was linked to a small number of incidents in which green-painted bricks were thrown through windows, including at 11 Downing Street, the official residence of the Chancellor of the Exchequer. The leadership stated that they had formed the party after a series of independent candidates, espousing various forms of Social Credit, had sought election and they feared that this proliferation of interpretations could lead to the ideological message being confused and weakened.

The party stood a single candidate in the 1935 general election, Wilfred Townend, who polled 11% of the vote in Leeds South. Despite this lack of success, Hargrave was invited by William Aberhart to take an advisory post in the Government of the Province of Alberta, Canada, that had been formed by the Social Credit Party of Alberta. There were an additional two Independent candidates who stood advocating a National Dividend; Reginald Kenney in Bradford North and H.C. Bell in Birmingham Erdington.

The party began to decline when political uniforms were banned by the Public Order Act 1936. Its activities were curtailed during World War II, and attempts to rebuild afterwards around a campaign against bread rationing had little success. Hargrave stood again in the 1950 general election, but after he gained only 551 votes, the party disbanded itself in 1951.

In 1976, C. J. Hunt, treasurer of the Social Credit Political League, formed a new party under the old name. This short-lived group was based in Bradford, West Yorkshire, where it was active in local politics.

== Monetary reform supporters ==
Notable supporters of Social Credit or "monetary reform" in Britain in the 1920s and 1930s included aircraft manufacturer A. V. Roe, scientist Frederick Soddy, author Henry Williamson, military historian J. F. C. Fuller and Sir Oswald Mosley, in 1928-30 a member of the Labour Government but later the leader of the British Union of Fascists. Rolf Gardiner had published articles by both Hargrave and Douglas in his journal Youth although this was during the 1920s and he had no formal links to the Social Credit Party.

In the early part of its existence Lord Tavistock had been loosely associated with the party although he would later lend his support to the British People's Party, as a result of which that group espoused elements of Social Credit.
