= Kibbo Kift =

British youth movement

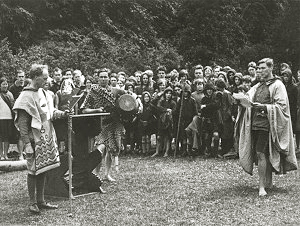
- 'Kinsmen' in ceremonial robes at the opening ceremony of the 1927 Althing, the Kibbo Kift annual general meeting
- Country: England
- Founded: 18 August 1920
- Defunct: 1935
- Founder: John Hargrave

The Kindred of the Kibbo Kift was a camping, hiking and handicraft group with ambitions to bring world peace. It was the first of three movements in England associated with the charismatic artist and writer John Hargrave (1894–1982). The Kindred was founded in 1920. Some members continued into Hargrave's Green Shirt Movement for Social Credit, which was established in 1931–32, and which became in 1935 the Social Credit Party of Great Britain and Northern Ireland. This was wound up in 1951.

Hargrave claimed all three organisations to be part of one mission, telling his followers after the last title-change: "We are the Green Shirts – indeed we are the Kindred – calling ourselves the Social Credit Party of Great Britain officially, but knowing full well who and what we are. 'Whelm on me ye Resurrected Men!' – I give you that outcry of the Kin in 1927."

The mission was the belief that Kibbo Kift training would produce a core of healthy and creative individuals through whom the human race would evolve into a society without war, poverty and wasted lives. The Kibbo Kift held that individual character strengthened by mental discipline was the key to the future, not mass movements based on groups defined by class, race or nation states.

== Origins ==
The Kindred was formed at a meeting held on 18 August 1920 at the offices of the Charity Organisation Society. Besides Hargrave, the movers were Mrs Emmeline Pethick-Lawrence, a former suffragette and Theosophist-inclined pacifist; and Dr C. K. Cullen, socialist-inclined medical officer in East London and a youth leader at the Camelot Youth Club in Poplar. All three shared a broad vision of creating a new model for character–building youth groups, a progressive, co-educational and non-militaristic alternative to The Boy Scouts Association. However, there were differences. In the early years of the Kibbo Kift, there were ideological and personal wranglings over the new organisation, from which Hargrave emerged in 1924 as the 'Head Man'.

Hargrave (aka 'White Fox'), artist, author and The Boy Scouts Association's Commissioner for Woodcraft and Camping, had become disenchanted with the increasingly militaristic tendency in The Boy Scouts Association after World War I. Soon after the formation of the Kindred, Hargrave was expelled from The Boy Scouts Association by its chief, Robert Baden-Powell. According to Hargrave, Baden-Powell acted with extreme reluctance and only after some wealthy backers had threatened to withdraw funding from The Boy Scouts Association unless he was expelled.

The Kibbo Kift did indeed offer an alternative to The Boy Scouts Association: it was open to both sexes and all ages. The ideas of world peace and the regeneration of urban man through the open-air life replaced the nationalism and militarism Hargrave had detested in the post–World War I Boy Scouts Association. In its mixture of woodcraft, ritual and handicraft, it had much in common with the Order of Woodcraft Chivalry and the British Camp Fire Girls, which Hargrave knew through his wife, Ruth Clark, who led a Camp Fire Girls group at the Garden School run by the Theosophical Educational Trust in St John's Wood. The school moved in 1920 to Ballinger Grange in Buckinghamshire where it became something of a Kibbo Kift centre.

== Beliefs ==
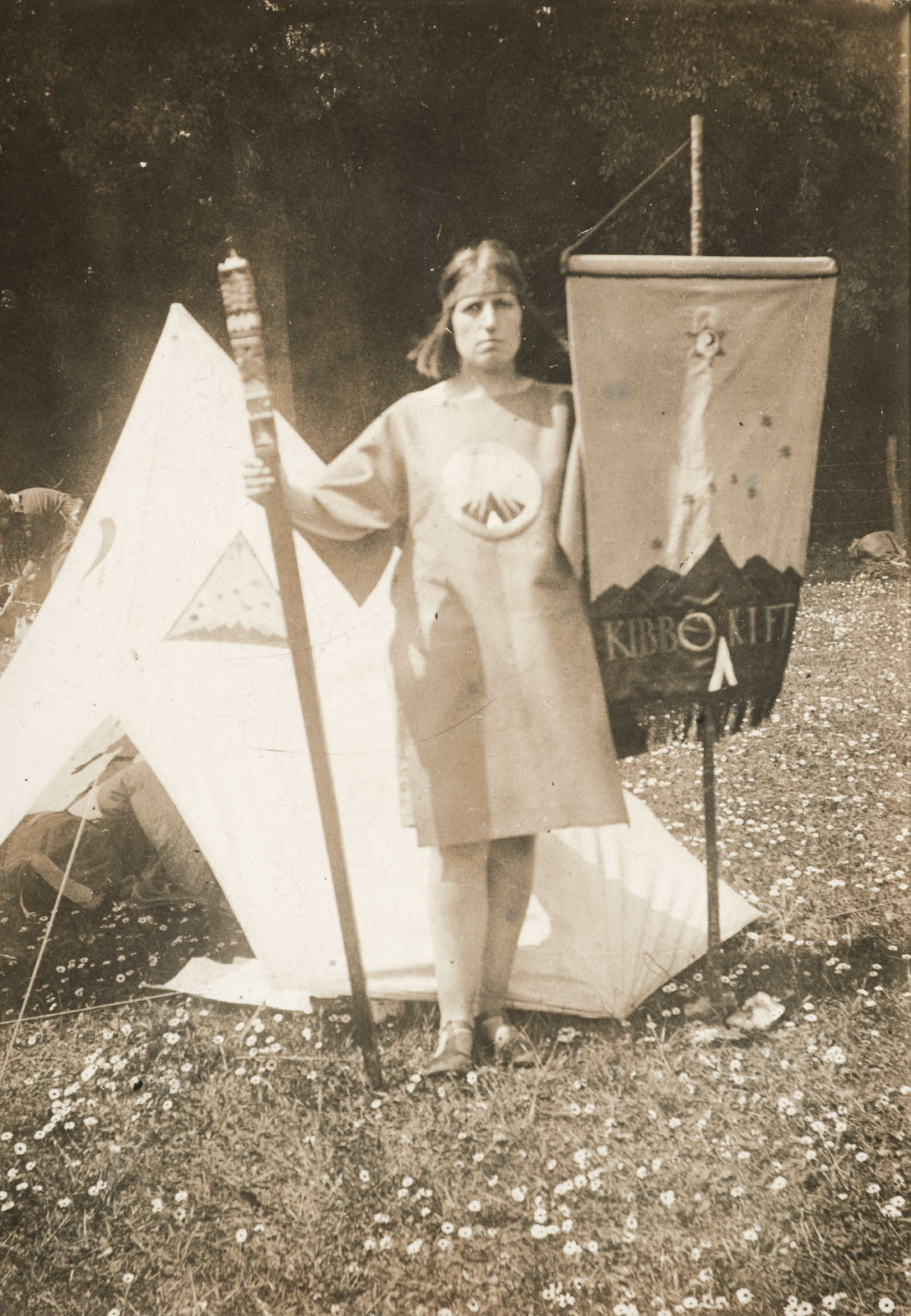
Joyce Reason in Kibbo Kift attire, holding a banner

The words Kibbo Kift come from a Cheshire dialect term used to indicate "proof of great strength", specifically lifting a heavy bag of grain (about 142 kg, or 325 lb) onto one's shoulders. The group's initials have led some to assume a relationship to the Ku Klux Klan but this has no basis in fact (and Hargrave took great pains to correct this misapprehension in the popular press during the group's lifetime). Kibbo Kift had interests in regional geography and world culture that coexisted with passionate ideas about national identity. The group has been claimed to be "the only genuine English national movement of modern times".

In 1920 Hargrave explained what the distinctive words meant:

Kibbo Kift is an old English expression meaning literally proof of great strength – or The Strong. So today, in the woodcraft camp we speak of:
KIBBO KIFT – meaning the Idea and Ideal of the Great Outdoor Trail and Open Air Education
THE KIBBO KIFT – meaning the Woodcraft Kindred, or the people who follow the great Woodcraft Trail
TO BE KIBBO KIFT – meaning to be a good camper and woodcrafter, to be a clean, strong, upright man (woman or child).

The movement drew heavily on the woodcraft ideas of naturalist Ernest Thompson Seton (also a key part of the early Scout Movement). Hargrave also imported into the movement his fondness for 'symbology', art and ritual – drawing his ideas on art from Jane Ellen Harrison, and on education from G.Stanley Hall's then fashionable theory of 'recapitulation'. Kibbo Kift was also strongly influenced by ideas about myth and religion from James Frazer's popular anthropological study, The Golden Bough.

In the second half of the 1920s the Kindred's educational ideas tended to be swamped by Hargrave's enthusiasm for the economic theory of Social Credit, but the faith in ritual and ceremony remained strong. According to Hargrave in 1924: "The Ceremonial System of the Kibbo Kift with all its Colour and Symbolism, has been, is, and must always remain vital to the expression of our ideals and to our method of propaganda. Other movements can go on with their everlasting, excessively dull and too often fruitless meetings, manifestos, reports and resolutions. They are not for us." Inspiration for the more concealed of Kibbo Kift rituals came from a range of hermetic sources including the writings of Aleister Crowley.

== Activities ==
Those who joined the Kibbo Kift had to sign up to a lengthy covenant, which set out some great Utopian ideals. In many aspects it resembled American President Woodrow Wilson's Fourteen Points, a blueprint for world peace at the close of the Great War. The establishment of a League of Nations Union as well as H. G. Wells's more far-reaching call for a World State were key touchstones for Kibbo Kift policies. A shorter, more personal, 'Declaration' abbreviated the covenant and was used especially for younger members:

I wish to be Kibbo Kift and to
1. Camp out and keep fit
2. Help others
3. Learn how to make things
4. Work for world peace and brotherhood

Kinsmen and women were organised into 'Things' (districts), Clans (groups), Tribes (groups with children, such as scout patrols or classes from a school) and Lodges (groups of adults). There was also room for 'Lone Kinsmen', who kept up with the movement through newsletters: The Mark (1922–23), The Nomad (1923–25), and Broadsheet (1925–38). Each individual took a 'woodcraft name': thus Emmeline Pethick-Lawrence was 'Lotosa' ('Look to the Stars'). The correct costume had to be hand-made by each individual or 'rooftree' (family group), according to designs laid down by Hargrave. The everyday 'habit' of Saxon hood, jerkin, shorts and long cloak must have seemed outlandish in the English countryside of the early 1920s. The popular press also drew attention to the group's skimpy exercise costumes; these included brassiere-type tops for women and gee-strings or breech-clouts for men. By the late 1920s the movement's ceremonial occasions required brilliantly coloured surcoats or silk-embroidered robes, worn by the various office-holders such as the Tallykeeper, Campswarden, Ritesmaster and Gleeman. Hargrave himself was 'Head Man'.

The Mark of the Kindred of the Kibbo Kift is typical of the symbolism that can be seen in many of their designs. Its meaning is: Worship (The K sign) Forever (the Circle of Unity and Eternity) Life (the Flame) through Knowledge (the Tree). Or again, "Worship Life Forever with Knowledge".

Groups devised their own local activities, such as mumming plays, weekend camps, weekly meetings and excursions to museums. All groups came together for the annual Althings (assemblies), Spring hikes and Autumn Gleemotes (festivals). The Kibbo Kift's central activities, hiking and camping, were elevated to the level of a spiritual exercise: all marked by colourful and impressive ritual, couched in language reminiscent of Norse Sagas and rich in Saxon archaisms. Hikes could be turned into 'pilgrimages', as for example in 1924 when the Kibbo Kift made a pilgrimage to Piltdown in Sussex, in homage to 'Dawn Man', a supposed early humanoid whose skull had recently been unearthed (later found to be a hoax). At the site the Kindred performed a ceremony, complete with fire rituals, psalm singing, ritual chanting and a plaster cast replica of the skull.

Kinsmen were not only required to make their own lightweight, one-man hiking tents (the first seen in England) but to decorate them with vivid, symbolic designs of their own devising. The movement included several talented art and craft teachers, including Kathleen Milnes ('Blue Falcon'), Winifred Tuckfield ('Iarmailteach'), a co-founder of the Knox Guild of Design and Crafts, and C.W. Paul Jones ('Old Mole'). Consequently, the robes, regalia, tents, totems and artefacts can display an extremely high standard of craftsmanship. Hargrave designed most of the movement's official visual symbols, including the striking banners and the 'sigils' (symbols) which were made into embroidered badges by Ruth Clark for the coloured surcoats of mandated officials. His designs for Kibbo Kift banners from the late 1920s are stronger and more graphic, probably a consequence of his work as a freelance advertising artist and copywriter, principally for Lever Brothers and Carlton Studios. The direct influence of commercial designers such as Edward McKnight Kauffer and Ashley Havinden is evident in Hargrave's style.

== Members ==
The Kibbo Kift were never more than a few hundred strong at any one time but over a thousand members signed a covenant in total. Kinsmen and Kinswomen included former suffragettes Emmeline Pethick-Lawrence, Mary Neal and May Billinghurst, Evelyn Sharp (her husband, the journalist Henry Nevinson, was a passive supporter), the photographer Angus McBean, Ruth Clark, the mountaineer Mabel Barker (Patrick Geddes' god-daughter, through whom the Kindred became involved in Regional Survey work), the explorer Millican Dalton, Roland Berrill – later a founder of Mensa, and Rolf Gardiner – a folk-dance revivalist. Many teachers and art teachers were attracted by the movement's educational aspirations. Kibbo-Kift friendly schools included Matlock Modern School in Derbyshire and the King Alfred School in North London. A major Kibbo Kift Educational Exhibition was held at Whitechapel Gallery in 1929.

The 'Advisory Committee' named on the Kindred's stationery did little more than lend their names to the organisation: they included Havelock Ellis, Maurice Maeterlinck, the Bengali poet Rabindranath Tagore, H. G. Wells and Professor Julian Huxley. Patrick Geddes was the exception in taking a more active interest in the group. D. H. Lawrence followed the progress of the Kindred via the letters of Rolf Gardiner, and it has been suggested that Mellors in Lady Chatterley's Lover is based on an archetypal Kinsman. T. E. Lawrence is also said to have allowed Kinsmen to camp on his land.

Emmeline Pethick-Lawrence and Rolf Gardiner tried to link the Kindred with European youth groups (arranging for Hargrave's woodcraft books to be translated and published in Germany in the early 1920s). Although international Kibbo Kift groups appeared sporadically (the White Fang Tribe in Russia, for example) the only lasting European group was in Belgium, the Lawerce Lodge in Antwerp.

== Changes ==
The growth of the Kibbo Kift had setbacks. In 1924, the South London co-operative lodges seceded from the movement. This was the culmination of a growing dissatisfaction with Hargrave's top-down decision-making structure and his tendency to make outlandish public claims for the organisation that deviated from the covenant and risked ridicule. In June 1924, a group of 32 signatories produced a circular leaflet stating "That the administration of Kibbo Kift during recent months has been profoundly unsatisfactory". At the 1924 Althing, Dr. Cullen, Gordon Ellis, and Joseph Reeves from the Royal Arsenal Cooperative Society, which had supported the Kindred financially, led the formal walk out. One of the departing members, Leslie Paul, formed The Woodcraft Folk, which outlived its parent organisation and still exists as of 2024.

Social Credit Party of Great Britain logo

In 1924, Hargrave was introduced to the theory of social credit. The theory was first put forward by C. H. Douglas, as early as the First World War. It was taken up by The New Age magazine which, under the radical leadership of A. R. Orage, enjoyed an influence out of proportion to its circulation. In the second half of the 1920s, Hargrave became progressively more preoccupied with social credit, seeing the Kindred as the megaphone, through which these esoteric ideas could reach the general public. By 1931, the Kibbo Kift was well on the way towards becoming a political movement with a single-minded mission: focussing on the state of the British nation and spreading social credit ideas among the unemployed ('surplus labour' in Hargrave's terms) in Britain's industrial cities. Again, the movement was split from top to bottom, but by 1932, the transformation was complete, and Kibbo Kift was no more. The Anglo-Saxon costume, camping, hiking and woodcraft were replaced by military uniform, marching and propagandising. The name was changed to the Green Shirt Movement for Social Credit, and later to the Social Credit Party of Great Britain and Northern Ireland.

As the Green Shirts, the Social Credit Party played a role in the political street culture of the 1930s: marching, meeting and often clashing with the Black Shirts and the Red Shirts. The Public Order Act 1936, which banned the wearing of uniforms by political groups, was a great setback for a movement that relied on agit-prop, but it was World War II that provided the deathblow. The organisation was wound up in 1951.

== Legacy ==
In 1976 The Kibbo Kift a rock musical, was put on at the Traverse Theatre for the Edinburgh Festival. The musical, created by Judge Smith and Maxwell Hutchinson, transferred to Sheffield's Crucible Theatre, where, produced by Mel Smith, it played to great acclaim. This flurry of interest led to the formation of the Kibbo Kift Foundation, dedicated to preserving the documentary and material archive of the movement. The surviving artefacts, costume and regalia were lent to the National Trust Museum of Childhood at Sudbury Hall in Derbyshire, but in 1982 they were deposited with the Museum of London. The documentary archive went first to the University of Cardiff and then the British Library of Political and Economic Science. In 2015 over 300 items from the Museum of London's collection were made accessible online through the museum's website. The collection features strongly in Designing Utopia: John Hargrave and the Kibbo Kift by Cathy Ross and Oliver Bennett, published by the museum in 2015.

An exhibition, "Intellectual Barbarians: The Kibbo Kift Kindred", exploring the group's artistic output, ran at Whitechapel Gallery, London from October 2015 to March 2016, co-curated by Annebella Pollen and Nayia Yiakoumaki. The exhibition showcased original garments, sculptures, furniture, paintings, photographs and ephemera from public and private collections, and was accompanied by a series of public events. The exhibition coincided with the first full-length book to examine the organisation's visual style and occult beliefs. Featuring over a hundred images, The Kindred of the Kibbo Kift: Intellectual Barbarians, written by Annebella Pollen, designed by Roland Brauchli, and published by Donlon Books, won a Most Beautiful Swiss Books award in 2015.

A new generation of creative practitioners have found inspiration in Kibbo Kift. Artists and designers including Olivia Plender, Steven Claydon and Liam Hodges, as well as novelists (Matthew De Abaitua, Kate Atkinson) and musicians (Ganser), have used Kibbo Kift ideas and imagery in their work.

== See also ==
- Forest kindergarten
- Wandervogel
