= Order of Woodcraft Chivalry =

- Formation: 1916; 110 years ago
- Founder: Ernest Westlake
- Type: Scouting-like movement
- Location: United Kingdom
- Members: 1200 (1926)
- Main organ: The Pinecone

The Order of Woodcraft Chivalry is a scouting-like movement operating in the United Kingdom, which was founded in 1916 by Ernest Westlake. It was inspired by Ernest Thompson Seton's Woodcraft Indians, and Seton was its honorary Grand Chieftain. Whilst largely being contemporary to Baden-Powell's Scouting movement, it differed from it in that it does not have the perceived military overtones of Scouting, instead focusing on the virtues of kindness, fellowship and woodcraft. The Order was small compared to Scouts, having only 1,200 members by 1926. By the 1950s it had ceased to have a major public presence. It still exists (2016) as a semi-formal network of personal friends with historic family links to the original formal organisation, with little interest in publicity and few surviving overt connections with the Woodcraft Folk or the Forest School Camps.

The Order accepted many premises of Neopaganism. It has been suggested by writer Steve Wilson that it provided the basis for the New Forest coven, and through that the Neopagan religion of Wicca.

== History ==
=== Founding ===
Westlake was a naturalist, anthropologist and traveller of Quaker upbringing, however in 1909 he began to fault Quakerism and extol the "old gods" of paganism. He was inspired by authors such as Edward Carpenter, Nietzsche, Havelock Ellis, Jane Ellen Harrison, Tylor and Frazer, and saw the Order as saving people from "the cul de sac of intellectualized religion" and reviving the "greater Hellas" of modern civilisation. He saw women as incarnations of God, to be "worshipped in spirit and in truth"; he revered the Jack-in-the-Green, which he considered to be the English equivalent of Dionysus, and held that the "Trinity of Woodcraft" consisted of Pan, Artemis and Dionysus.

The first folkmoot ceremony of the Order was held at Sandy Balls, Westlake's estate on the northern edge of the New Forest, on Lammas 1921, with the sacred fire lit by four people dressed in colours of the elements of each quarter, bringing greetings from the elemental powers in succession from north round to west. Despite these pagan themes, Westlake did not consider they were departing from Christianity, and claimed that "one must be a good pagan before one can be a good Christian". He held that after his resurrection Jesus Christ had become dissolved into nature, and that by recognising the divinity inherent in nature people would come closer to Christ. Consequently, the Order promoted a "mystical and animist" view of nature.

The Order had a considerable influence in the founding of the Forest School Camps movement.

There is little evidence of interactions between the Order and the Woodcraft Folk, which was also a breakaway from the Kibbo Kift and was similarly inspired by Seton. This may have been because the Order of Woodcraft Chivalry was non-political and had a mainly affluent middle-class membership (e.g. Westlake owned a country estate) while the Woodcraft Folk, which styled itself 'The Movement for Workers Children' in the 1920s, was predominantly a socialist working-class organisation at the time.

=== After Westlake ===
After Westlake's death in a motoring accident in 1922, the role of British Chief of the Order fell to Harry Byngham, who subsequently changed his name to Dion, short for Dionysus. Unlike Westlake, Dion Byngham found no attraction in Christianity, and zealously promoted paganism, naturism and phallic worship as a veneration of the life force. He started publishing an Order periodical called The Pinecone, which contained many provocative items, including a nude Dionysus on the cover of one issue, a photograph of a nude Byngham and his semi-nude girlfriend in Grecian dress, and a verse play by Victor Benjamin Neuburg, who also introduced Byngham to the ideas of the famous occultist Aleister Crowley. All this brought Byngham into strife with many of the Christian members of the Order, which was primarily aimed at children and had, by its pacifist stance, particularly appealed to Quaker families as an alternative to Scouting. In 1924 Byngham was replaced as editor and in 1925 he was suspended from the Council of Chiefs after posing nude with his girlfriend for press photographs to promote nudism.

Between 1922 and 1927 the rituals of the order continued to evolve along Masonic and quasi-Masonic lines, adopting elaborate titles and ritual equipment. In 1928 a compromise was accepted between the pagan- and the Christian-inclined members whereby the order would promote both the sanctity of nature and Christian ethics, while criticising the "repressive" aspects of Christianity. However membership fell. In 1929 the Society of Friends formally withdrew support for the Order, and by 1930 there were only 400 members remaining. In 1934 Aubrey Westlake, the son of Ernest, resigned as Chieftain, and in 1935 he left the order, depriving it of its meeting place at Sandy Balls. Steve Wilson argues that some of the pagan-inclined members split off to form the New Forest coven, which became the origin of the religion of Wicca.

=== Contemporary ===
Ronald Hutton stated in 1999 that "The Order continues to survive with a stable but small membership". In the 1990s Martin Westlake, son of Aubrey and grandson of Ernest, allowed the Order to celebrate its anniversary at Sandy Balls estate again.

A website in the Order's name exists and was last updated in Feb 2015. It seems to be mainly used by existing members to post photographs, etc, and contains little to attract potential new members. The Order survives as a small network of personal friends linked to the earlier formal organisation.

The OWC is a co-host, together with the Liga Lesni Moudrosti (The Woodcraft League of the Czech Republic), of the Blue Sky! World Woodcraft Gathering which takes place every three years alternately in the UK and the Czech Republic. Started in 1996, the gathering in 2017 will be the 8th meeting and will be held in the UK. Scouts and Woodcrafters from Poland and other countries also take part.
