= John Hargrave =

British social credit leader

- Hargrave in Kibbo Kift attire, c.1927

Leader of the Social Credit Party of Great Britain and Northern Ireland
- In office 1932–1951
- Preceded by: Party founded
- Succeeded by: Party dissolved

Head Man of the Kibbo Kift
- In office 18 August 1920 – 1935
- Preceded by: Organisation founded
- Succeeded by: Organisation dissolved

Personal details
- Born: John Gordon Hargrave; 6 June 1894 Midhurst, Sussex, England, UK
- Died: 21 November 1982 (aged 88)
- Writing career
- Occupations: Author, cartoonist, inventor, lexicographer, artist and psychic healer
- Spouses: Ruth Clark (m. 1919; div. 1952) Diana, Gwendolyn Gray (m. 1968)
- Children: 1
- Pen name: White Fox
- Notable work: Harbottle: a Modern Pilgrim's Progress from This world to That Which is to Come

Signature
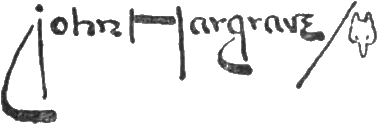

John Gordon Hargrave (6 June 1894 – 21 November 1982), (woodcraft name 'White Fox'), was a prominent youth leader and politician in Britain during the 1920s and 1930s, Head Man of the Kibbo Kift, described in his obituary as an 'author, cartoonist, inventor, lexicographer, artist and psychic healer'. He was a Utopian thinker, a believer in both science and magic, and a figure-head for the Social Credit movement in British politics.

== Early life ==
Born in Midhurst, Sussex, into an itinerant Quaker family, Hargrave was the son of painter Gordon Hargrave and his wife Babette Bing, of Jewish Hungarian descent. A bohemian childhood, spent partly in the Lake District, left him with a passion for Nature and a fierce propensity for self-education through reading books and observing the world around him. In 1908, the family moved to Latimer where in 1909 Hargrave joined the First Chorleywood Scouts, a group of Baden Powell's Boy Scouts. In 1910 his career as a published book illustrator began when a few of his vignettes appeared in an edition of Gulliver in Liliiput, published by Thomas Nelson & Sons, a commission almost certainly arranged through the patronage of Lady Chesham. He was also given a year-long trial as a cartoonist on the Evening Times. He became a devotee of the naturalist Ernest Thompson Seton, and one of the leading Scout authorities on Woodcraft. His interests in scouting, nature and art combined to produce the book that made his name, or rather his scouting name of 'White Fox'. This was Lonecraft published by Constable in 1913 and introducing the characteristic 'White Fox' style of no-nonsense text, interspersed with pictures and diagrams. Rising up the Scout hierarchy, Hargrave produced a succession of scouting and woodcraft books for C. Arthur Pearson Ltd, who offered him a position of staff artist in 1914, his first salaried job.

== Kibbo Kift ==
When World War I broke out, Hargrave joined the Royal Army Medical Corps and saw action at the Battle of Gallipoli. Hargrave's Quaker pacifism was reinforced by the horrors of war. The experience convinced him that modern civilisation had gone awry and he voiced his feelings in his angry polemic of 1919, The Great War Brings It Home. This was a call to action for all groups concerned with the health and character of future generations. Hargrave called for a new national scheme for character-building and physical training, and the result was the foundation of the Kindred of the Kibbo Kift in August 1920. Intended as a movement for all ages and genders, the Kibbo Kift provided a co-educational, and therefore progressive, alternative to the Boy Scouts. Hargrave was initially appointed 'Head Man' as a temporary measure, but by 1924 had succeeded in becoming the undisputed leader. As Head Man, he imported into the Kindred his interest in ritual and art, along with his own views about self-education, science, magic, and healthy behaviour. He was a strong believer in Darwinian evolution, holding that Kibbo Kift training would produce morally upright and healthy individuals, through whom the human species as a whole would evolve into a better state. He believed that building better individuals was the way of building a better society, thus standing apart from those on the left and right who believed in the State as the main vehicle for social change. Hargrave's vision of the better society to come owed much to his Quaker roots: he saw a future society without war, poverty or wasted lives, all kept together by the self-discipline of enlightened individuals.

The Kindred of the Kibbo Kift took its name from an old Kentish term for a feat of strength and it attracted support from a number of progressive thinkers, including: Patrick Geddes, Evelyn Sharp, H. G. Wells, and Emmeline Pethick-Lawrence. Membership remained fairly small (600–800) in the 1920s and included many teachers, artists and youth workers. Many developed an intense personal loyalty to Hargrave, remaining with him throughout the Kindred's transformation into the Green Shirts, and the Social Credit Party.

== Artist and writer ==
In the 1920s Hargrave's work as an artist was dominated by the designs, drawings and diagrams he produced for the Kibbo Kift. All express his fascination with 'symbology', the use of symbols or stylised representations to convey meaning. He controlled the visual style of the movement, designing the 'official' robes, badges, symbols, theatre sets and regalia himself: although individual members were encouraged to design and make their own personal totems. He had less success as an artist outside the movement, despite trying to establish himself as a portrait or landscape painter. In 1924 he exhibited a selection of his 'symbolic paintings' 'an attempt to express through the medium of paint Ideas rather than Objects in themselves'. During the late 1920s and 1930s, he worked as a freelance commercial artist in the advertising industry, producing layouts for Lever Brothers, whose advertising manager Colin Hurry was a friend; and for Carlton Studios, where he worked on campaigns for Watney's and Boot's the Chemist among others. He continued to sell illustrations to book publishers, including some cover work for Mills & Boon in 1922.

Hargrave enjoyed more public success as a novelist, publishing a best-seller Harbottle: A Modern Pilgrim's Progress from This World to That Which is to Come in 1924, and following it with a succession of popular novels published by Duckworth's. Many are stylised fables borrowing structures from books that Hargrave admired: Harbottle is based on John Bunyan, and Young Winkle (1926) is based on Rudyard Kipling's Kim. Entirely original, however, is Hargrave's experimental modernist masterpiece Summer Time Ends (1935). This symphonic text aspired to the condition of radio and film, weaving its characters' speech in and out of refrains and rhythms. The book was well received in America (John Steinbeck was a fan), and was praised by Ezra Pound, by this time an admirer of Hargrave.

== Social Credit ==
In 1924 Hargrave was introduced to the economic theory of Social Credit, the creation of C. H. Douglas. Hargrave took up the creed with fervour, attracted by its seemingly-scientific 'truth' and its sense of mission. Social Credit changed Hargrave's belief in the reformed individual as the key to a better society: the key was actually, he now believed, a reformed economic system. By the late 1920s he had re-purposed the Kindred to be a 'megaphone' for social credit, bringing the esoteric economic theory to the public at large.

The remaining Kibbo Kift members were transformed into a fighting force, still disciplined and healthy but now engaged in 'unarmed military technique'. Hargrave joined up with the Legion of the Unemployed in Coventry in 1930, and furnished them with green shirts and berets. By 1932, the Kibbo Kift were also in the green uniform, together forming the Green Shirt Movement for Social Credit. The Green Shirts soon became part of the street politics of the 1930s, engaging in battles with both Oswald Mosley's British Union of Fascists, the Black Shirts, and the Red Shirt supporters of the Communist Party of Great Britain. Hargrave designed a striking new flag for his Social Credit movements, the green and black double K device, which he christened the 'Key Symbol'. He also introduced a strong element of theatricality into the Green Shirts' political protest, with ritual marches round the Bank of England, drumming, 'street chalking' and publicity stunts such as throwing a green brick into 11 Downing Street.

Initially staying out of parliamentary politics, Hargrave changed his mind in 1935, re-branding the Green Shirt movement as the Social Credit Party of Great Britain and Northern Ireland for the purposes of fighting the 1935 General Election. He was also impressed by the success of the Social Credit Party of Alberta (Canada). Douglas opposed the entry of the movement into parliamentary politics. Hargrave soon travelled to Alberta, frustrated at the lack of progress that the Social Credit government there was making. He was appointed an economic adviser to the Government of Alberta and was disowned by Douglas. He left Canada in 1936, returning to find the Social Credit Party in disarray after the Public Order Act 1936 banned the wearing of uniforms by non-military personnel. Undeterred, Hargrave steered the Social Credit Party into a more evangelical mood, adopting quasi-religious slogans ('God's Providence is Mine Inheritance') and organising public 'Services of National Regeneration'. He broke with Ezra Pound, an episode which underlined his opposition to Fascism.

The Social Credit Party was mothballed during the war, although Hargrave tried to keep his ideas alive through a weekly newsletter, The Message from Hargrave. He was urged to stand for Parliament in the 1945 election, but did not: only returning to public politics in 1950 when he stood as a candidate in Hackney North and Stoke Newington in the 1950 general election. The 551 votes he received convinced Hargrave to give up, and by 1951 he had disbanded the Party.

== Inventor, healer and cartoonist ==
In 1937 Hargrave became obsessed with solving the technological problems of using maps in moving aeroplanes. By 1938 a prototype of the Hargrave Automatic Navigator was ready to file with the Patent Office and articles of association had been prepared for 'Hargrave Aviation Ltd.'. The prototype was tested during the war, with government approval, but lack of capital meant that the invention was not developed further. The invention lay fallow until 1976 when Hargrave sued the British Government, claiming that the moving map display supplied by Britain to the supersonic Concorde, was, in fact, his Automatic Navigator. His claim was taken up by journalists, resulting eventually in a Public Enquiry. Hargrave insisted he was only asking for recognition, rather than any financial recompense, but the Public Enquiry found against him.

During the war, Hargrave had returned to his interest in science and magic (he always considered both as equally valid methods for harnessing the forces of nature). He became convinced of his own powers and set up as a healer, offering a variety of techniques. Chief among these were the use of 'Therapeutic Psychographs', abstract artworks created by Hargrave which were prescribed to his patients with instructions to stare at the artwork for a set period of time every day.

In the 1950s Hargrave earned a living as a cartoonist, working under the name of 'Spiv' or sometimes just 'H'. His work appeared in Cavalcade, The Sketch and Time and Tide. He was commissioned to write the entry on Paracelsus for the Encyclopædia Britannica (Hargrave had published The Life and Soul of Paracelsus in 1951). He submitted a stream of manuscripts, radio plays and film scripts to producers and publishers, always searching for opportunities to realise his ideas: he continued to believe that Social Credit was the solution to the world's economic problems. John Hargrave died on 21 November 1982, aged 88 at his home in Branch Hill Lodge, Hampstead.

== Personal life and surviving papers ==
Hargrave married Ruth Clark, the daughter of the engineer William Clark on 28 November 1919. Their marriage produced one son although the couple were divorced in 1952. He remarried in 1968, his new wife being Diana, the actress Gwendolyn Florence Gray.

John Hargrave's personal papers, including his diaries and unpublished mss., are held at the British Library of Political and Economic Science. His artwork, including designs for the Kibbo Kift, work as a commercial artist and family photographs are held in the Museum of London (the Kibbo Kift Collection). Model III of Hargrave's Automatic Navigator is held in the Science Museum.

== Key published works ==
- Lonecraft (1913)
- At Suvla Bay (1916)
- The Wigwam Papers (1916)
- The Totem Talks (1918)
- Tribal Training (1919)
- The Great War Brings It Home (1919)
- The Confession of the Kibbo Kift (1927)
- Summer Time Ends (1935)
- Professor Skinner alias Montagu Norman (1935)
- The Alberta Report (1937)
- Words Win Wars (1940)
- Social Credit Clearly Explained (1945)
- The Life And Soul Of Paracelsus (1951)
- The Paragon Dictionary (1952)
- The Suvla Bay Landing (1964)
- The Facts of the Case Concerning the Hargrave Automatic Navigator for Aircraft (1969)
