= Woodcraft =

Skill and experience in living and thriving in the woods

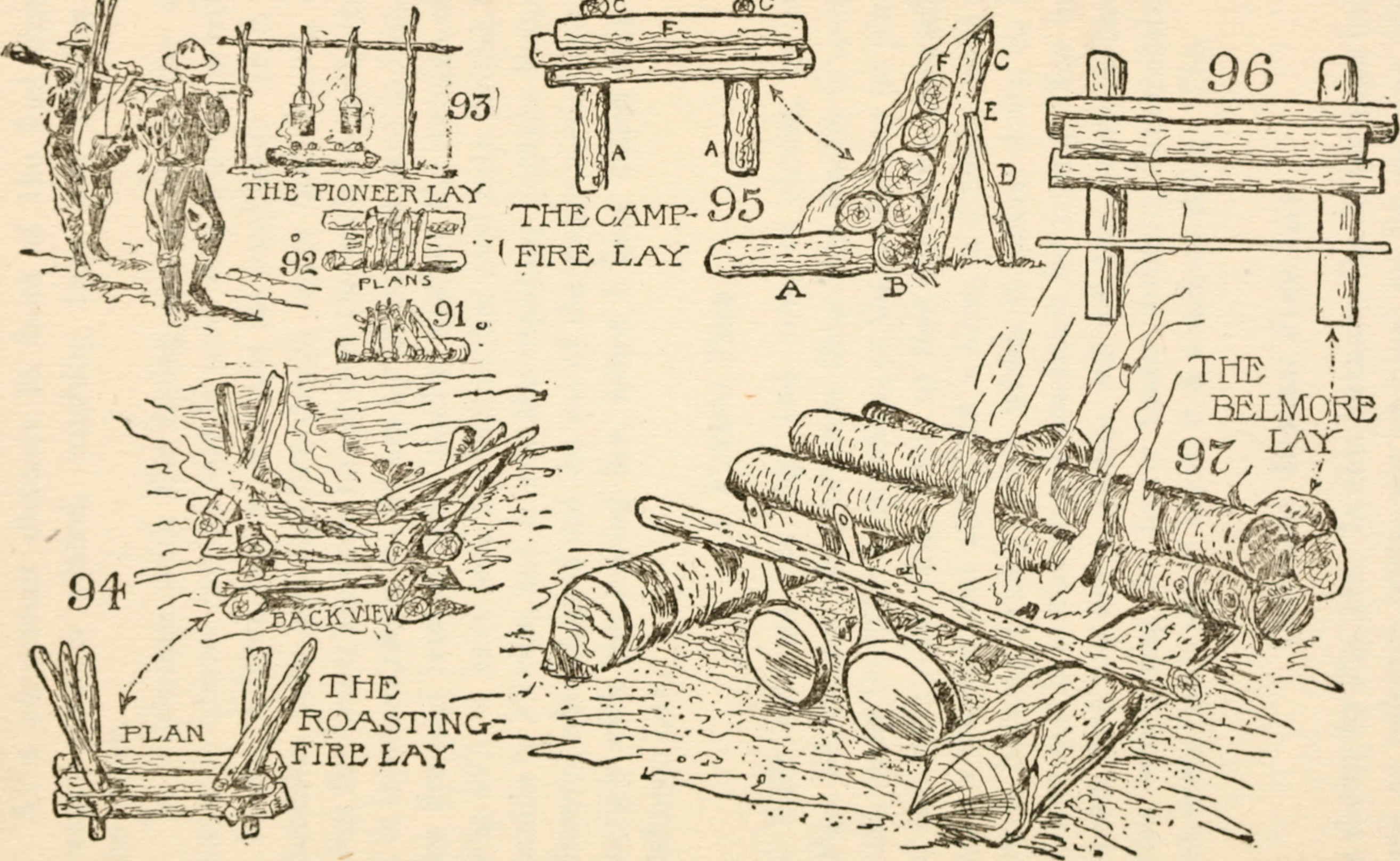
Campfire instructions from The American Boys' Handybook of Camp-lore and Woodcraft (1920)

Woodcraft or woodlore is skill and experience in living and thriving in the woods, either on a short- or long-term basis. It includes skills as hunting, fishing, and camping. Traditionally, woodcraft was associated with subsistence lifestyles and hunting-gathering. In modern developed countries it is more commonly associated with outdoor recreation or survivalism. Woodcraft is one form of bushcraft.

== Techniques ==
A partial list of recreational woodcraft techniques might include knowledge of wildlife behavior, identifying and utilizing wild plants and animals (especially for food), camp cooking, orienteering (including hiking skills and use of a map and compass), fire making (including procurement of firewood), selecting and preparing a campsite, lashing and knot techniques, the use of tents and wilderness first aid.

== Contexts and significance ==
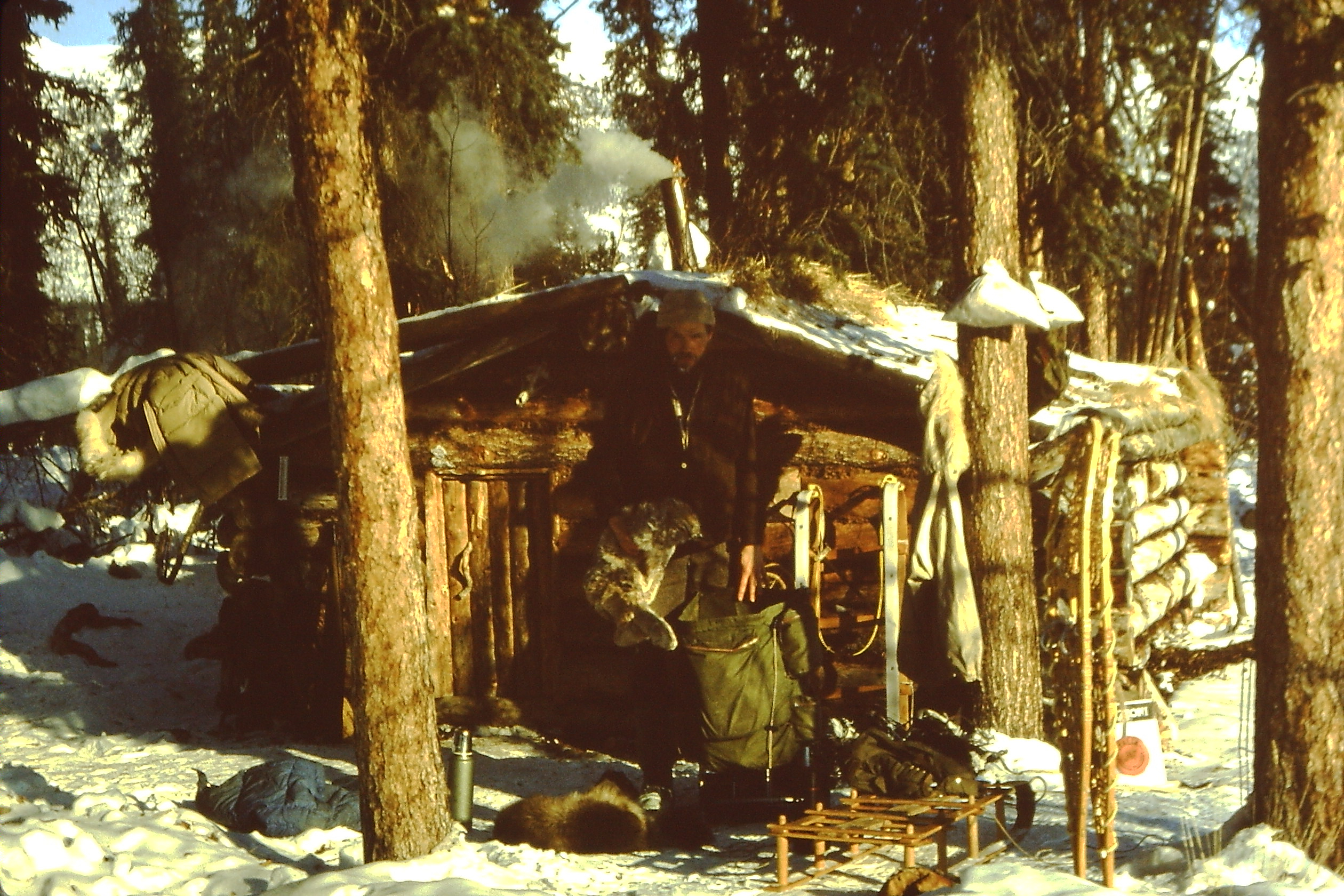
Trapper's cabin in Alaska, 1980s

The Scouting movement has adopted woodcraft techniques as a core skill set known as scoutcraft.

In the United States, woodcraft techniques in a military context are taught as part of SERE (Survival, Evasion, Resistance and Escape) training.

Traditional woodcraft has particular importance in American folklore, especially that relating to the early American frontier.

In the UK, the Woodcraft Folk are an organisation founded on the principles of woodcraft. Other woodcraft organisations include the Woodcraft League of America, which was founded by Ernest Seton, and the Woodcraft youth movement.

== See also ==
- Batoning
