= Second Brazilian Republic =

1930–1937 federal republic in South America

Republic of the United States of Brazil República dos Estados Unidos do Brasil
- 1930–1937
- Flag (1889–1960) Coat of Arms (1889–1968)
- Motto: Ordem e Progresso "Order and Progress"
- Anthem: Hino Nacional Brasileiro "Brazilian National Anthem"
- Capital: Rio de Janeiro
- Common languages: Portuguese
- Government: Federal provisional government (1930–1934); Federal presidential republic (1934–1937)
- President
  - 1930: Military junta
  - 1930–1937: Getúlio Vargas
- Legislature: National Congress
  - Upper house: Senate
  - Lower house: Chamber of Deputies
- Historical era: Vargas era • Interwar period
  - Revolution of 1930: 24 October 1930
  - Constitutionalist Revolution: 9 July 1932
  - New Constitution: 16 July 1934
  - Communist Uprising: 23 November 1935
  - Estado Novo coup: 10 November 1937
- Currency: Real
Preceded by	Succeeded by
First Brazilian Republic	Third Brazilian Republic

The Second Brazilian Republic, officially the Republic of the United States of Brazil, was the period in Brazilian history between 1930 and 1937, during the Vargas Era. It began with the Revolution of 1930, led by Getúlio Vargas, and was divided into three phases: the transitional government, the provisional government, and the constitutional government. It ended with a coup d'état carried out by Vargas in 1937, which gave rise to the Estado Novo.

The transitional government was the period during which a Provisional Governing Junta ruled the country for a short time after the deposition of Washington Luís. The provisional government was the period during which Vargas ruled by decree as head of state until the promulgation of the 1934 Constitution. The constitutional government began when Vargas was elected president in 1934, alongside a democratically elected legislature.

== Background ==
=== Revolution of 1930 ===
On 7 September 1930, the revolutionary movement gained new momentum. On that day, Antônio Carlos handed over the government of Minas Gerais to Olegário Maciel, who was far more determined to lead a revolution than his predecessor. President Olegário was the only state president to remain in office after the 1930 revolution.

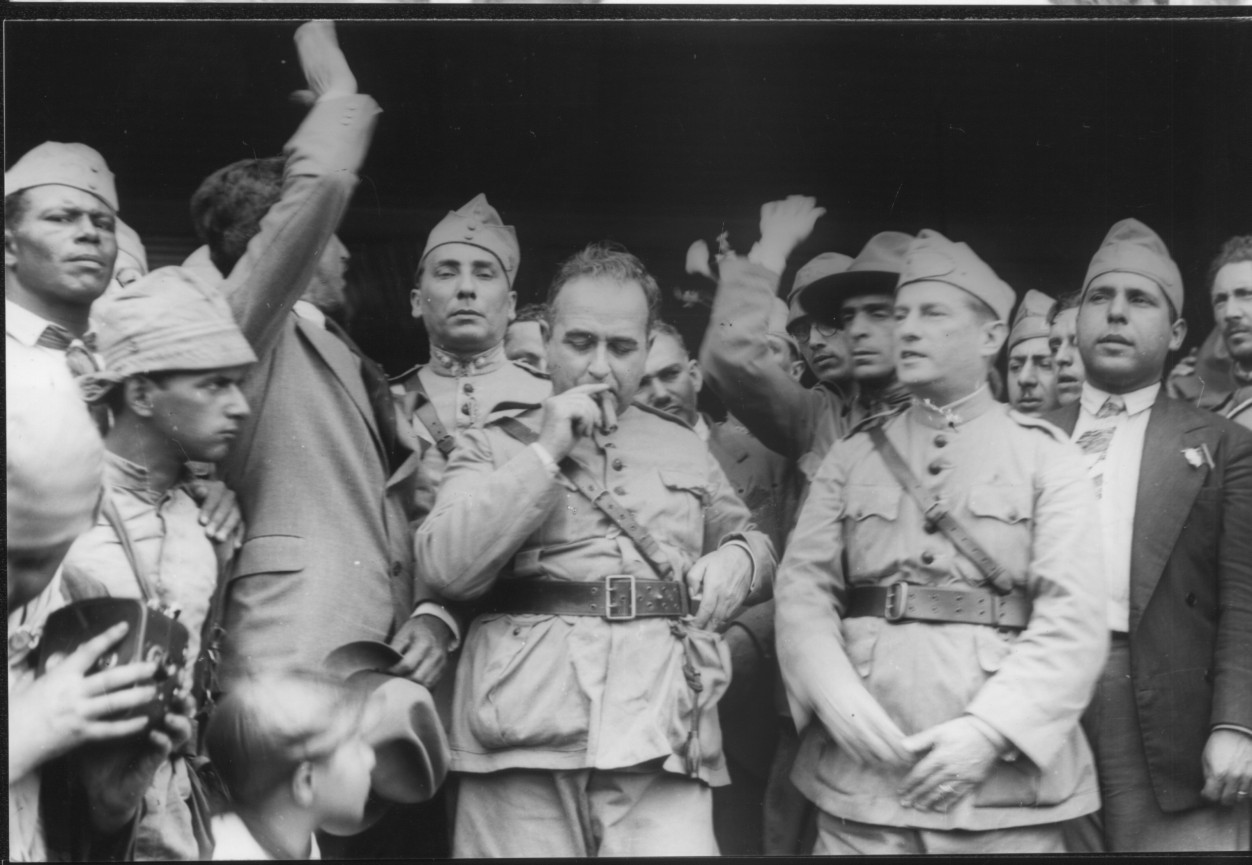
Getúlio Vargas, with other leaders of the 1930 Revolution in Itararé, São Paulo, shortly after the overthrow of Washington Luís

Regarding the secrecy of the conspiracy, Vargas told Revista do Globo, in a special August 1950 edition, that his daughter Alzira only learned about the revolution two days before it began. He stated: "In 1930, while preparing the revolution, I was forced to play a double game: by day, I maintained order for the federal government, and by night, I brought the conspirators into the Piratini Palace." On 25 September 1930, the revolutionary command determined that the revolution would begin on 3 October at 17:00. The start of the revolution had already been postponed several times due to hesitation and indecision among the revolutionaries.

This time, there were no delays. On the afternoon of 3 October 1930, in Porto Alegre, the Revolution began with the seizure of the headquarters of the 3rd Military Region. The attack was led by Oswaldo Aranha and Flores da Cunha. This assault marked the first deaths of the revolution.

One fact illustrates how seriously Getúlio Vargas took the revolution: on that very day, 3 October, he began writing his diary, which he continued until 1942. In the first entry, Vargas noted that the commander of the 3rd Military Region, general Gil Dias de Almeida, shortly before his headquarters was attacked, told Vargas that he would burn his library if Minas Gerais joined the revolution.

By mid-October, the revolutionaries controlled only parts of northeastern and southern Brazil. The states that remained loyal to the federal government were Santa Catarina, Bahia, São Paulo, Rio de Janeiro, and the Federal District, as well as the entire northern region of Brazil—Amazonas, Pará, and the Territory of Acre—and all of the Central-West, including Goiás and Mato Grosso. The government of Santa Catarina was overthrown on 16 October, and the remaining loyal states fell only with the end of the revolution. Barbosa Lima Sobrinho, in his book The Truth About the 1930 Revolution, recounted the occupation of the state of Espírito Santo by troops from Minas Gerais. The Espírito Santo government was deposed on 16 October 1930.

In northeastern Brazil, the revolutionaries were marching toward Bahia. In the south, revolutionaries coming from Rio Grande do Sul were stationed in the Itararé region, on the border between Paraná and São Paulo, where federal government forces and troops from São Paulo were camped to halt the advance of the revolutionary forces.

A major battle was expected to take place in Itararé. Vargas was waiting in Curitiba, observing developments. In southern Minas Gerais, federal troops still resisted the advance of Minas Gerais forces marching toward Rio de Janeiro. However, the anticipated "Battle of Itararé" never occurred. On 24 October, before any fighting could take place, generals Tasso Fragoso and Mena Barreto, along with admiral Isaías de Noronha, overthrew president Washington Luís in a military coup, forming a Provisional Military Junta presided over by Fragoso. That same day, Oswaldo Aranha was sent to Rio de Janeiro to negotiate the transfer of power to Getúlio Vargas. The Military Junta governed Brazil until it handed power over to Getúlio on 3 November 1930. Washington Luís was deposed just 22 days before the end of his presidency, which was set to conclude on 15 November 1930.

Newspapers that supported the deposed government were destroyed—a practice then referred to as empastelamento—including influential ones such as O Paiz, A Noite, Correio Paulistano, the official gazette of the Republican Party of São Paulo (PRP), A Plateia, Gazeta de Notícias, A Crítica, and Folha da Manhã (today’s Folha de S. Paulo). The headquarters of O Paiz was completely set on fire. The police forces of Rio de Janeiro, then the federal capital, and of São Paulo, did nothing to stop the acts of vandalism. In the city of São Paulo, illegal gambling (jogo do bicho) stalls were attacked under suspicion of financing the PRP and the overthrown state government.

Washington Luís, Júlio Prestes, and several other key political figures of the First Brazilian Republic, such as Manuel Tomás Carvalho de Brito, José Maria Belo, Átila Neves, Irineu Machado, Otávio Mangabeira, Melo Viana, and Antônio Prado Júnior, among others, were arrested and exiled. Washington Luís only returned to Brazil in 1947, after the ousting of Getúlio Vargas in 1945.

After a brief stay in São Paulo, where he took over the Campos Elísios Palace, seat of the deposed state government, Vargas headed to Rio de Janeiro. Minas Gerais and Rio Grande do Sul soldiers, with their rifles slung over their shoulders, stood guard for Vargas at the seat of the São Paulo government. Varags arrived in Rio de Janeiro by train on 31 October 1930. He first sought to get a hold of the political situation in Rio de Janeiro before officially taking office.

== Provisional government (1930–1934) ==
At 15:00 on 3 November 1930, the Provisional Military Junta transferred power to Getúlio Vargas at the Catete Palace, marking the end of the First Republic. In his inaugural speech, Vargas outlined 17 goals to be pursued by the Provisional Government. At the same time, in downtown Rio de Janeiro, Rio Grande do Sul soldiers fulfilled their symbolic promise of tying their horses to the obelisk on Central Avenue (now Rio Branco Avenue), marking the triumph of the revolution. Among the major tenentist leaders of 1930, João Cabanas was the only one present at the ceremony.

In a speech thanking the people of Minas Gerais for their support in Belo Horizonte on 23 February 1931, Vargas acknowledged the primacy of Antônio Carlos Ribeiro de Andrada as the first politician to sense that a revolution was imminent. Vargas also credited Antônio Carlos as the one who launched his presidential candidacy:

I wish to personally express my deep gratitude for the spontaneity and enthusiasm with which the people of Minas Gerais accepted my candidacy, suggested by the prophetic words of Antônio Carlos—the first who, with clairvoyant certainty, saw on the distant curve of the horizon the coming revolutionary storm.

Vargas became head of the Provisional Government with broad powers. The revolutionaries did not accept the title "President of the Republic". His provisional government was the second in the history of republican Brazil—the first being that of Deodoro da Fonseca. Vargas ruled by decree, and these held the force of law, unbound by a Constitution. On 11 November 1930, Decree No. 19.398 was issued, establishing and regulating the operations of the Provisional Government. This decree:

- Suspended the constitutional guarantees of the 1891 Constitution, except for habeas corpus in cases of common crimes;
- Confirmed the dissolution of the National Congress of Brazil, the state legislatures, and municipal councils. The deputies, senators, and state governors elected in 1930 never took office;
- Validated all acts of the Provisional Military Junta;
- Authorized Getúlio Vargas to freely appoint and dismiss interventores (federal appointees) to govern the states—mostly tenentists who had participated in the revolution;
- Excluded from judicial review all acts of the Provisional Government and those of the federal interventores in the states. Thus, no act or decree of the Provisional Government or the interventores could be challenged in Brazilian courts;
- The actions of the federal interventores were regulated, under the Provisional Government, by the so-called Código dos Interventores (Interventors' Code)—Decree No. 20.348, dated 29 August 1931—which created consultative councils in the states, the Federal District, and the municipalities, and laid out rules for local administration.

Officers of the armed forces who remained loyal to the deposed government had their careers abruptly ended—they were forcibly retired from active duty by decree. In the Supreme Federal Court, in February 1931, six justices who had supported the deposed government were compulsorily retired, and the number of justices was reduced from fifteen to eleven. Even in the Brazilian Navy, which had not fought against the 1930 revolutionaries, forced retirements were carried out at Vargas' insistence, prompting the Minister of the Navy, Isaías de Noronha, to resign.

The administrations and politicians of the First Republic were thoroughly investigated through a so-called "Revolutionary Justice" and a "Special Tribunal", both created in 1930 by the decree that established the Provisional Government, and organized by Decree No. 19.440, dated 28 November 1930, whose purpose was the "prosecution and judgment of political, administrative, and other crimes to be specified in its organizational law".

Juarez Távora, in addition to being Minister of Transportation and later Minister of Agriculture, was secretly appointed, by classified decree filed at the Ministry of War, as head of a "Northern Delegation", giving him control over all federal interventores in the Northeast. This earned him the nickname "Viceroy of the North".

The political radicalization of the tenentes posed the greatest threat to Vargas on 25 February 1932, when an opposition newspaper, Diário Carioca, was destroyed in Rio de Janeiro (another case of empastelamento). Vargas' refusal to punish the tenentes involved in the case led to the resignation of Labor Minister Lindolfo Collor, Justice Minister Maurício Cardoso, and Chief of Police João Batista Luzardo. João Neves da Fontoura also broke ties with Vargas. Luzardo, in a letter, denounced the Provisional Government's involvement in the attack on Diário Carioca. In solidarity, Rio de Janeiro's newspapers stopped publishing for two days.

The ministerial cabinet of the Provisional Government, composed of only nine members (seven civilians and two military officers), was carefully assembled to reward all the three main states, political parties (the Liberator Party, the PRR, the PRM, the Paraíba Republican Party, and the Democratic Party), tenentes, and the Provisional Military Junta, who together had led the Revolution of 1930. Vargas' major difficulty with the tenentes in the states—besides the rivalries among them—was their lack of preparation for governance. With few exceptions, such as Juracy Magalhães, the tenentes performed poorly as administrators.

Their performance was described in February 1932, four months before the outbreak of the Constitutionalist Revolution, by lieutenant João Cabanas, one of the leaders of the São Paulo Revolt of 1924 and a revolutionary in 1930. In his book Fariseus da Revolução ("Pharisees of the Revolution"), he criticized lieutenant João Alberto Lins de Barros, who had governed São Paulo from 1930 to 1931, as well as the other federal interventores in the states.

The conflict with the revolutionary left, which included many military officers and would later intensify, began early in the Provisional Government: On 22 January 1931, a subversive plot was uncovered within the labor unions in Santos and Rio de Janeiro. Among those arrested was the young Carlos Lacerda. Because of this incident, the May Day parade of 1931 was suspended.

== Constitutional government (1934–1937) ==
Vargas' new presidential term began on 20 July 1934, when he took office in the National Congress, swearing allegiance to the new constitution. Vargas was to govern until 3 May 1938. The 1934 Constitution did not provide for the office of vice president. Subsequently, the states adopted their own constitutions, and many federal intervenors became governors, elected by the state legislatures—this represented a broad victory in the states for Vargas' supporters.

On 4 April 1935, Law No. 38 was enacted, defining crimes against political and social order, enabling stricter measures in combating threats to public order. It became known as the National Security Law.

Between May and June 1935, Vargas visited Argentina and Uruguay. Before him, only one president (Campos Sales) had ever left the country during his term. During Vargas' absence, the president of the Chamber of Deputies, Antônio Carlos Ribeiro de Andrada, assumed the presidency.

On 22 July 1935, an official government radio program was created to broadcast government news: Hora do Brasil (Hour of Brazil), later renamed Voz do Brasil (Voice of Brazil), which still exists today.

On 31 August 1935, Getúlio Vargas traveled to the town of João Monlevade in Minas Gerais to lay the cornerstone of the Companhia Siderúrgica Belgo-Mineira, a "child" of Brazil's first steel mill, also located in João Monlevade.

During this period, political and ideological radicalization in Brazil intensified, especially between the fascist-inspired Brazilian Integralist Action (AIB), led by Plínio Salgado, and the pro-Soviet National Liberation Alliance (ANL), dominated by the Brazilian Communist Party (PCB). The closure of the ANL through Decree No. 229, issued on 11 July 1935, and the arrest of some of its members, hastened conspiracies that led to the Communist Uprising on 24 November 1935, in northeastern Brazil, and on 27 November in the federal capital.

The revolutionary movement occurred in several Brazilian cities. In Rio de Janeiro, there was a military uprising in the 3rd Infantry Regiment, where several people were killed. Fighting also occurred in Recife. In Natal, the communists even took power briefly, but were later defeated by inland troops from the countryside of Rio Grande do Norte, led by Dinarte de Medeiros Mariz.

Starting with the Communist Uprising, Vargas repeatedly decreed states of emergency and states of war throughout the country, and laws aimed at combating subversion were toughened. The National Security Law was reinforced on 14 December 1935, by Law No. 136, which defined new crimes against public order. On 18 December 1935, three amendments to the 1934 Constitution were enacted, granting greater powers to the Brazilian state in the fight against subversion.

On 17 January 1936, Law No. 192 was enacted, aiming to limit the military power of the states by subordinating state military police forces to the Brazilian Army, restricting their size, and prohibiting them from possessing artillery, aviation, or tanks. The heavy weaponry previously held by state police forces was handed over to the army.

On 23 March 1936, senator Abel de Abreu Chermont and three federal deputies were arrested for complicity in the Communist Uprising. On 3 April 1936, the mayor of Rio de Janeiro, Pedro Ernesto, was also arrested on suspicion of having supported the uprising.

On 11 September 1936, Law No. 244 created a special court to trial the revolutionaries involved in the uprising, called the National Security Court. During this period, political instability in Brazil grew significantly. All of this led Vargas, with broad support from the military, to establish the Estado Novo regime.

In November 1936, the Agricultural and Industrial Credit Department of the Bank of Brazil was created. Under Law No. 454, enacted on 9 July 1937, it began to raise funds from the capital markets and pension funds to finance agriculture and livestock. On 11 June 1937, Lloyd Brasileiro, a major shipping company operating coastal and long-distance routes, was nationalized by Decree No. 1,708. This marked the beginning of a long period of nationalizations in Brazil, lasting until the 1980s. The company was taken over to counteract the maritime freight cartel.

From the end of 1936 onward, the political scene became increasingly dominated by the question of presidential succession. In May 1937, Vargas frequently recorded in his diary attempts to mediate between the two main presidential candidates, Armando Sales and José Américo de Almeida.
