= Brazilian Military Junta =

Brazilian Military Junta may refer to:

- Brazilian Military Junta of 1930, a provisional military body which governed Brazil in 1930
- Brazilian Military Junta of 1969, a provisional military body which governed Brazil in 1969
