= Magalhães Barata =

Brazilian politician (1888–1959)

Governor of Pará
- In office 10 June 1956 – 29 May 1959
- Preceded by: Edward Cattete Pinheiro
- Succeeded by: Luís Geolás de Moura Carvalho

Senator for the State of Pará
- In office 1946–1956

Federal Interventor on the State of Pará
- In office 20 February 1943 – 29 October 1945
- President: Getúlio Vargas
- Preceded by: Miguel José de Almeida Pernambuco Filho
- Succeeded by: João Guilherme Lameira Bittencourt
- In office 12 November 1930 – 12 April 1935
- President: Getúlio Vargas
- Preceded by: Pará Government Junta
- Succeeded by: Roberto Carlos Vasco Carneiro de Mendonça

Personal details
- Born: 2 June 1888 Belém, Pará, Brazil
- Died: 29 May 1959 (aged 70) Belém, Pará, Brazil

Joaquim de Magalhães Cardoso Barata (2 June 1888 – 29 May 1959) was a Brazilian army officer and politician who governed the state of Pará three times, twice as federal interventor for the Vargas Government and once as an elected governor during the Fourth Brazilian Republic, a period where he also served as senator for the state.

Born in the Val-de-Cães neighbourhood in Belém on 2 June 1888, to Major Marcelino Cardoso Barata and Gabrina de Magalhães Barata, Joaquim spent most of his childhood in the city of Monte Alegre, Pará, enlisted in the military in 1904 and graduated from the military school of Realengo on Rio de Janeiro in 1911 to become an Aspirant in the Brazilian Army.

As a member of the Tenentist Movement, Magalhães Barata participated in various rebellious and revolutionary attempts against the Brazilian government between 1922 and 1930, staying at times in both prison and exile, until with the success of the Revolution of 1930 he was appointed Federal Interventor to the State of Pará by the new administration, where he would lead a successful career as a politician.

Magalhães Barata was married to Georgina de Oliveira Barata, with whom he had two daughters.

== Biography ==
=== Youth ===
Born in the Val-de-Cães neighbourhood in Belém on 2 June 1888, to Major Marcelino Cardoso Barata and Gabrina de Magalhães Barata, Joaquim spent most of his childhood in the city of Monte Alegre, Pará, enlisted in the military in 1904 and graduated from the Escola Militar do Realengo on Rio de Janeiro in 1911 to become an Aspirant in the Brazilian Army.

After graduation, Magalhães Barata was sent to the 47th Hunter Battalion in his hometown of Belém, where he was promoted to second lieutenant in 1915 and given command of the garrison in the city of Oiapoque in the border with French Guiana. In 1920, he was promoted to first lieutenant and sent back to Rio de Janeiro.

=== Tenentist Revolutionary ===
After the initial revolutionary movements in 1922, Magalhães Barata joined the Tenentist Movement, where on 24 December 1923, he was given orders to move to the state of Paraná where on 28 December he would apprehend the minister of war Fernando Setembrino de Carvalho, an act which would serve as the spark to lead the rise of rebel forces in the state.

However, the plan was revealed and Magalhães Barata was jailed in the 25th on São Paulo, from where he was sent to Manaus to join the 27th Hunter Battalion. On 23 June 1924, in command of the battalion, he and other tenentists took over the government of the state of Amazonas to install a government junta led by his fellow revolutionary Alfredo Augusto Ribeiro Júnior.

The tenentists would expand into Pará and take control of the fortress of Óbidos in an attempt to assume control of the Amazon River, however, federal troops led by General João de Deus Mena Barreto took back the fortress on 20 August, after fighting with forces led by Magalhães Barata.

Jailed and sent to Belém together with some of his fellow revolutionaries, Magalhães Barata escaped prison and sought refuge in Uruguay, from where he would only come back in August 1930 when using a fake identity he returned to Belém and attempted to articulate a revolutionary movement in the region, however despite his disguise, he was once again jailed and sent to Rio de Janeiro.

=== Vargas Era ===
After the Revolution of 1930, Magalhães Barata was released from prison and returned to Belém, this time as Federal Interventor for the Vargas Government where he was met with great popular support, three days after taking over as interventor, he was promoted to captain and once again to major in August 1931.

In December 1931, Magalhães Barata founded the Liberal Party of Pará, which reunited the revolutionary elements in the state and supported the politics of Getúlio Vargas, being affiliated with his National Civic Union. On the elections of 1933, the Liberal Party elected all the representatives of the state of Pará to the National Constitutionalist Assembly.

By 1934 however, the party's influence decreased as the opposition united under the Paraense United Front, and in the elections held in October of that year, they only elected seven of the nine Federal Deputies and 21 of the 30 Deputies in the state's Constitutional Assembly. In 1935 the assemble attempted to elect Mário Chermont instead of Magalhães Barata after seven deputies of his Liberal Party broke off with him, this led to police force against the deputies to stop the voting, after which Magalhães Barata was elected governor of the state by the deputies which had been able to vote.

His election would not be upheld, as a habeas corpus impetrated to the Regional Electoral Tribunal put in question the legality of the elections, leading to a renewed federal intervention in the state led by Interventor Roberto Carlos Vasco Carneiro de Mendonça on 12 April 1935, and after efforts to pacify the region, new elections were held on 29 April 1935, where José Carneiro da Gama Malcher was elected governor of Pará.

In January 1936, Magalhães Barata returned to active military service, assuming command of the 6th Hunter Battalion in Ipameri, in May of the same year, was promoted to lieutenant colonel and in September 1939 was promoted to colonel remaining in military service until 8 February 1943, when he was once again nominated Federal Interventor in the State of Pará where he remained until the end of the Vargas Government.

=== Politician ===
In 1945, the last year of the Vargas Government, Magalhães Barata was one of the founding members of the Social Democratic Party, even founding its branch on the state of Pará, preparing to participate in the state elections on 2 December 1945.

However, the state elections were suspended due to the deposition of Vargas, but the federal elections were held and Magalhães Barata supported the election Eurico Gaspar Dutra for the presidency and candidated himself to the Senate, both won.

As a senator, Magalhães Barata was a member of the Constitutional Commission, the Commission of the Armed Forces and the Subcommission of National Security, in 1947, he supported Major Luís Geolás de Moura Carvalho in the state elections for the state of Pará, which Moura Carvalho won, defeating General Alexandre Zacarias de Assunção. In 1950, Magalhães Barata attempted to become governor of Pará but was defeated by the same General Alexandre Zacarias de Assunção by 555 votes.

In 1954, Magalhães Barata got reelected as senator and in 1955 with the support of Juscelino Kubitschek he defeated Epílogo de Campos by 1743 votes and was elected governor of Pará, a position which he held until his death on 29 May 1959, at 70 years of age.

== Literary works ==
Magalhães Barata, Joaquim. "Programas de Estudos Primários para as Escolas Noturnas" (Primary studies programs for night schools). 1933 (in Portuguese).

== Read More ==
Cunha, Coimbra. "Normas de um governo; psicologia de um administrador: aspectos sociais de atos e despachos do cel. Magalhães Barata" (Rules of a government; psychology of an administrator: social aspects of the acts and rulings of Col. Magalhães Barata). 1944 (in Portuguese).

Ohana, Dalila Nogueira. "Eu e as últimas 72 horas de Magalhães Barata" (Me and the last 72 hours of Magalhães Barata). 1960 (in Portuguese).
