= Isaías de Noronha =

Brazilian naval officer (1873–1963)

Admiral Isaías de Noronha

Member of the Brazilian Military Junta
- In office 24 October 1930 – 3 November 1930 Serving with Tasso Fragoso, Mena Barreto
- Preceded by: Washington Luís (as President)
- Succeeded by: Getúlio Vargas (as President)

Minister of the Navy
- In office 25 October 1930 – 17 December 1930
- President: Military Junta (interim); Getúlio Vargas
- Preceded by: Arnaldo Pinto da Luz
- Succeeded by: Conrado Heck

Personal details
- Born: 6 June 1873 Rio de Janeiro, Neutral Municipality, Empire of Brazil
- Died: 29 January 1963 (aged 89) Rio de Janeiro, Guanabara, Brazil
- Parent(s): Manuel Muniz de Noronha (father); Zulmira Augusta Aguiar (mother)

Military service
- Allegiance: Empire of Brazil; Brazil
- Branch/service: Brazilian Navy
- Years of service: 1887–1941
- Rank: Vice Admiral
- Commands: See list: Destroyer Piauí; Directorate of Lighthouses of the Superintendence of Navigation; Destroyer Sergipe; Mobile Defense Headquarters; Aviso Lamego; Cruiser República; 2nd Section of the General Staff of the Navy; Steamer Carlos Gomes; 3rd Section of the General Staff of the Navy; Cruiser Barroso; Battleship Minas Gerais; Deputy Director of the Naval War School; Rio de Janeiro Naval Depot; Director of the Naval School; Director General of Personnel; Commander-in-Chief of the Fleet
- Battles/wars: Revolt of the Lash; Paraguayan Civil War; Revolution of 1930

José Isaías de Noronha (6 June 1873 – 29 January 1963) was a Brazilian Navy Admiral who briefly served as president of Brazil while being a member of the provisional military junta of 1930. Born into a military family, Noronha took up a naval career. He served aboard ships such as Andrada and Recife and commanded ships such as Piauí, Sergipe, and Minas Geraes. In 1930, he became one of the three members of the military junta which ruled Brazil between October and November 1930. When the junta acquiesced to revolutionaries, Noronha initially remained as minister of the Navy in the administration of President Getúlio Vargas. He was also president of the Naval Club before and after the junta.

== Early life and career ==
=== Early and personal life ===
José Isaías de Noronha was born in Rio de Janeiro on 6 June 1873 to Zulmira Augusta Aguiar Noronha and lieutenant general Manuel Muniz de Noronha. (Note: Noronha's birth date is disputed. According to Pechman and Almeida de Souza, he was born on 6 June 1873. According to Presidência da República, he was born on 6 July 1873. This article uses 6 June 1873 as Noronha's birth date.) His uncle, Admiral Júlio César de Noronha, was the minister of the Navy between 1902 and 1906, and his cousin, Admiral Sílvio de Noronha, held the same position between 1946 and 1951. Noronha enrolled in a preparatory course in the Naval School in March 1887. In December 1889, he became a first-class aspirant and, in 1892, a midshipman. While serving as a midshipman, the Naval Revolts broke out in September 1893 against President Floriano Peixoto, but Noronha did not participate in them. He was incorporated into the crew of the cruiser Andrada in July 1894, becoming second lieutenant in November. Noronha was promoted to first lieutenant in December 1896 after being transferred to the brig Recife in January 1895. He would go on to serve on the cruiser 15 de Novembro. In December 1897, he was assigned to the Maritime Charter Division and served as assistant to the Directorate of Hydrography. In 1898, he commanded the aviso Lamego from March to June. Noronha commanded Trinidade the same year. In his personal life, he married Neréa Antonieta de Noronha, with whom he had nine children.

=== Rise ===
Successively between January 1899 and November 1902, Noronha was aide-de-camp to the commanders of the 3rd and 1st Naval Divisions. He would also be an aide-de-camp to his uncle Júlio. Noronha was promoted to captain lieutenant in January 1906. After his uncle left office in November, Noronha served as an artillery instructor on the battleship Riachuelo. He was assistant to the Inspector of Ports and Coasts between October 1907 and April 1909. The following month, he was promoted to corvette captain and assigned to the training ship Benjamin Constant. In 1910, he was interim commander of the destroyer Piauí, during which the Revolt of the Lash broke out and Noronha received orders to prepare his ship for combat against the insurgents, though this never happened. He left command of Piauí in December.

After commanding Piauí, Noronha headed the Directorate of Lighthouses of the Superintendence of Navigation from January to October 1911. He left to command the destroyer Sergipe, which, in February 1912, was positioned near Asunción to defend it from rebels amid instability in Paraguay. Noronha joined the Mobile Defense of Rio de Janeiro from July 1912 to August 1913. Promoted to frigate captain in February 1914, he was assigned to command the cruiser República in May, serving there until October 1915. He was also a part of and at times headed the third (operations) and second (information) sections of the Navy General Staff during this time. Noronha assumed command of the steamer Carlos Gomes in January 1916, and in November he assumed command of the cruiser Barroso. From November 1917 to February 1919, he directed the Grumetes School until he was promoted to captain at sea, when he took command of the battleship Minas Geraes in March. In February 1920, Noronha left and was made captain of the port of Pará in August, serving there for a year. When 1922 began, he had completed the course of the Naval School of War and was vice director of the school between February and December. From 1922 to 1923, he directed the Naval Deposit of Rio de Janeiro. Noronha was promoted to rear admiral in April 1923, and he directed the Naval School between May 1923 and January 1925. He was again director of the school from 1926 until August 1927, when he became Commander-in-Chief of the Squadron until his resignation in November 1928. He also served as president of the Naval Club between 1927 and 1929.

== Military junta and later years ==
Ministers of Isaías de Noronha (Note: This was also the military junta's ministers as Noronha was a constituent of the junta.)
Office	Name	Term
Minister of Agriculture, Industry and Commerce	Paulo de Moraes Barros	24 October–3 November 1930
Minister of Finance	Agenor Lafayete de Roure	25 October–3 November 1930
Minister of War	José Fernandes Leite de Castro	24 October–3 November 1930
Minister of Justice and Internal Affairs	Gabriel Loureiro Bernardes	24–26 October 1930
Afrânio de Melo Franco	26 October–3 November 1930
Minister of the Navy	Himself	25 October–3 November 1930
Minister of Transport and Public Works	Paulo de Moraes Barros	25 October–3 November 1930
Minister of External Relations	Afrânio de Melo Franco	24 October–3 November 1930

On 3 October 1930, the Revolution of 1930 broke out in the states of Rio Grande do Sul, Minas Gerais, and Paraíba. Several state capitals capitulated to revolutionaries, and they began to march towards Rio de Janeiro. High-ranking military officers in the capital reacted by deposing President Washington Luís. Noronha was the link with the Navy established by General João de Deus Mena Barreto through the latter's wife, Ernestina Estela Noronha Mena Barreto, a relative of Noronha, in the preparations for Luís's deposition. A military junta was created as a provisional governing body to replace the president of Brazil, with Admiral Noronha being a representative of the navy and a junta member alongside Generals Augusto Tasso Fragoso and Mena Barreto. Noronha also assumed the position of minister of the Navy beginning 25 October, succeeding Arnaldo de Siqueira Pinto da Luz. The junta, among other measures, began to demilitarize Brazil, authorized banking operations to resume, and opened a line of credit to attack yellow fever. After the junta proposed that hostilities be suspended, revolutionaries in Ponta Grossa continued to advance towards Rio de Janeiro. The junta handed over power to Getúlio Vargas, who led the revolutionary forces, on 3 November. Noronha was kept in Vargas's government as Navy minister. On 17 December 1930, however, he resigned and was replaced by Conrado Heck.

He was promoted to vice admiral in January 1931 and elected president of the Naval Club in June. He resigned in October 1932 and claimed he would be transferred to reserve the next month. Nevertheless, he was successively reelected, serving until 1937. On 6 July 1941, he retired. Noronha died on 29 January 1963 in Rio de Janeiro.

== Notes ==
Political offices
Preceded by Washington Luís as President	Member of the Brazilian Military Junta alongside: Mena Barreto, Tasso Fragoso; 1930	Succeeded by Getúlio Vargas as President
