= Augusto Tasso Fragoso =

Brazilian general and president

General Augusto Tasso Fragoso

President of the Brazilian Military Junta
- In office 24 October 1930 – 3 November 1930 Serving with Mena Barreto, Isaías de Noronha
- Preceded by: Washington Luís (as President)
- Succeeded by: Getúlio Vargas (as President)

Justice of the Superior Military Court
- In office 28 April 1933 – 19 February 1938
- Nominated by: Getúlio Vargas
- Preceded by: Mena Barreto
- Succeeded by: Raimundo Rodrigues Barbosa

Chief of the General Staff of the Army
- In office 30 March 1931 – 22 August 1932
- President: Getúlio Vargas
- Preceded by: Alfredo Malan D'Angrogne
- Succeeded by: Francisco Ramos de Andrade Neves
- In office 21 November 1922 – 24 January 1929
- President: Artur Bernardes; Washington Luís
- Preceded by: Fernando Setembrino de Carvalho
- Succeeded by: Alexandre Henriques Vieira Leal

Personal details
- Born: 28 August 1869 São Luís, Maranhão, Empire of Brazil
- Died: 20 September 1945 (aged 76) Rio de Janeiro, Federal District, Brazil
- Spouse: Josefa da Graça Aranha (m. 1895)
- Children: 6
- Parent(s): Joaquim Coelho Fragoso (father); Maria Custódia de Sousa (mother)

Military service
- Allegiance: Empire of Brazil; Republic of Brazil
- Branch/service: Brazilian Army
- Years of service: 1885–1945
- Rank: Divisional general
- Commands: See list: Department of Works and General Transport; Commission for the Fortification and Defense of the Coast of Brazil; 8th Cavalry Regiment; 2nd Cavalry Brigade; Chief of the Military Cabinet; 1st Cavalry Regiment; 4th Cavalry Brigade; War Material Director
- Battles/wars: Brazilian Naval Revolt; Copacabana Fort Revolt; Revolution of 1930; Constitutionalist Revolution

General Augusto Tasso Fragoso, better known as Tasso Fragoso (28 August 1869 – 20 September 1945) was a Brazilian military, judge of the Superior Military Court (Superior Tribunal Militar, STM) and writer. During the Revolution of 1930 he was president of the Provisional Government Board of 1930, which ruled Brazil from 24 October to 3 November, between the deposition of President Washington Luis and the inauguration of Getúlio Vargas.

He was also the cousin of Portuguese President António Óscar Fragoso Carmona.

He was the first citizen from Maranhão to become President of Brazil.

== Early life ==
Augusto Tasso Fragoso was born in São Luís, state capital of Maranhão, in 1869. In his official documents he says that he was born in 1867, due to the change, common at the time, made by his father so that he could start his military life earlier.

It was the result of the union of Maria Custódia de Souza Fragoso, born in Pará, and Joaquim Coelho Fragoso, a Portuguese from Baião, district of Porto.

His father, Joaquim, was the manager of the Companhia de Navegação Fluvial and, according to the biographer of Tasso Fragoso, to whom “the province [of Maranhão] already owed the foundation of several industrial companies”. For his services, he was appointed vice-consul of Portugal in Maranhão and later elevated to the rank of Consul of Ceará and Piauí in 1894.

== Career ==
=== Republican Coup ===
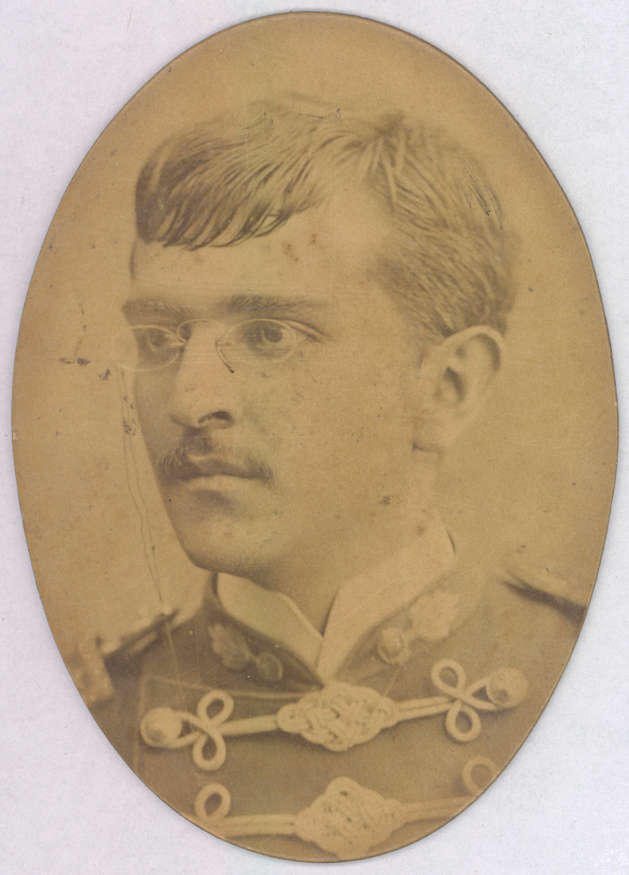
Tasso Fragoso in 1890

A military man, while still young, he became acquainted, in Rio de Janeiro, with the positivist ideas disseminated by Benjamin Constant.

Promoted to alferes-aluno (officer cadet) in January 1889, from April onwards he attended the General Staff and Engineering courses at the Escola Superior de Guerra (Superior War College), earning a bachelor's degree in mathematics and physical and natural sciences. During this period, he participated in the articulations of the movement for the implantation of the Republic in Brazil. In October, when relations between the emperor, Dom Pedro II, and the army were tense, he spoke on behalf of his colleagues in honor of Benjamin Constant, affirming everyone's determination to accompany the professor “in the transformation about to take place in our country”. After this act, Benjamim Constant was dismissed from his duties and the students were reprimanded.

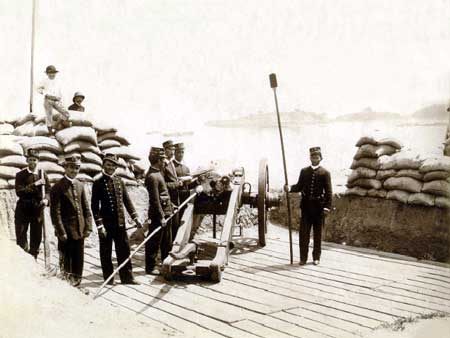
A loyalist Army battery during the Revolta da Armada, in Rio de Janeiro, 1894.

Around November 15, upon hearing of movements for the proclamation of the Republic, Tasso Fragoso, in uniform and armed, joined other comrades and headed for the school, where everyone awaited the arrival of Benjamim Constant and General Manuel Deodoro da Fonseca.

Subsequently, he took over, together with the then officer cadet Cândido Mariano Rondon, to ascertain the position of then Admiral Eduardo Wandenkolk regarding the movement, which ended up toppling the monarchy and implemented the new form of government in the country.

In 1891, he assumed the Head of the Department of Works and General Transportation of the Federal District - then Rio de Janeiro -, holding the position until the month of April of the following year. In 1893, as a loyalist, he participated in the repression of the Revolta da Armada, which intended to overthrow the government of Floriano Peixoto. In 1908, he traveled to Europe as a member of the General Staff of Minister of War Hermes da Fonseca.

=== Military attaché in Argentina ===
Appointed military attaché to the Brazilian legation in Argentina, Tasso Fragoso traveled to that country in July 1909, being promoted to lieutenant colonel in December of that same year. Back in Brazil, in July 1910, he assumed command of the 8th Cavalry Regiment, headquartered in Uruguaiana (RS), where he remained until April 1913. During this period, he exercised temporarily command of the 2nd Brigade of Cavalry, several times.

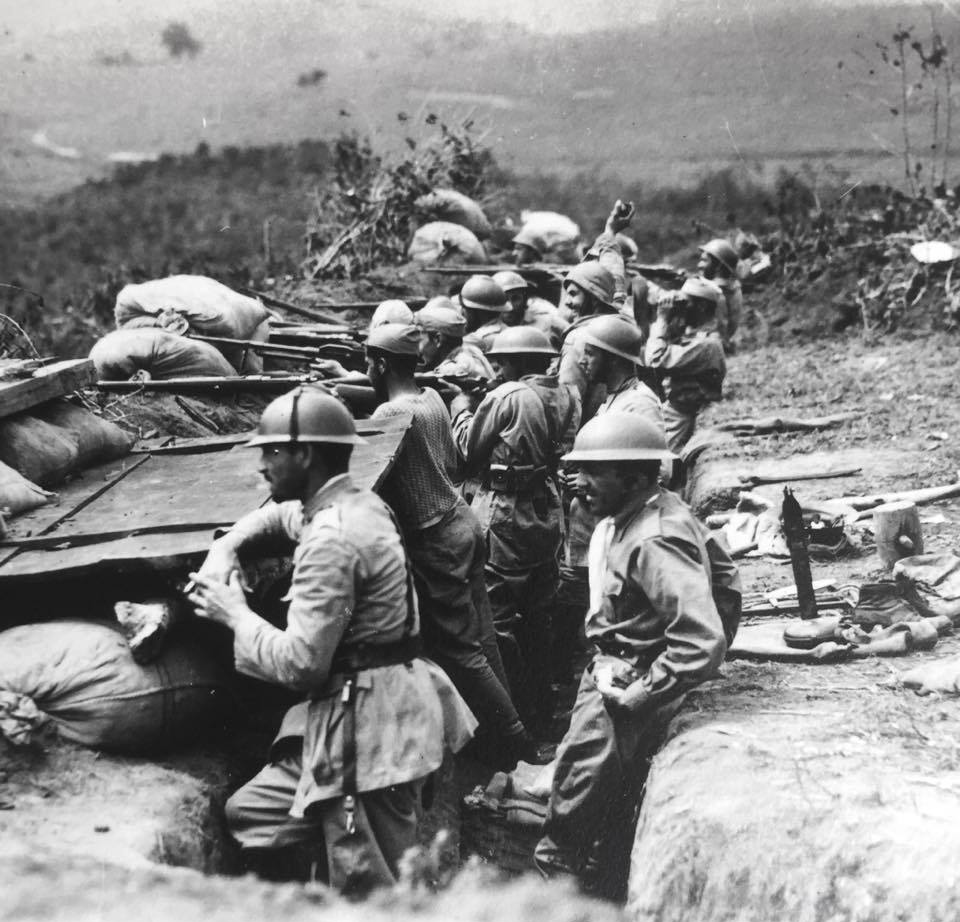
Trench of rebel Paulista soldiers on the outskirts of Amparo, in São Paulo, 1932.

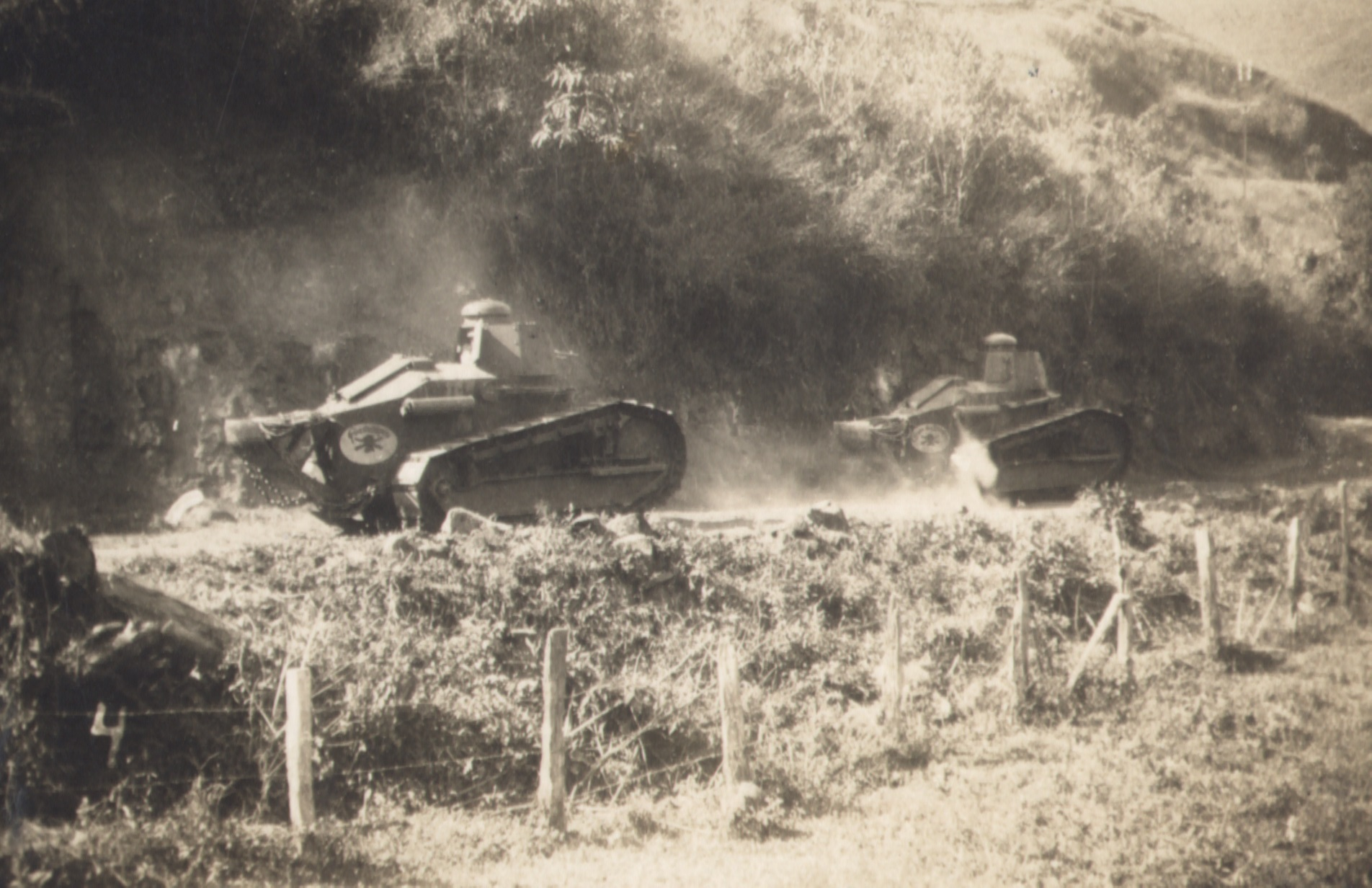
Loyalist Renault FT-17 tanks advancing into combat in the sector of Itaguaré, in São Paulo, 1932.

In 1914, he was appointed Head of the Military House by President Venceslau Brás, remaining in this position until 1917. During this period, he played an important role in implementing compulsory military service and in remodeling the Army amid the changes taking place as Brazil entered in World War I.

=== Generalship ===
Tasso Fragoso attained generalship in 1918. On 21 November 1922, he was appointed Chief of Staff of the Army, where he remained until 24 January 1929. He stood out in the process of remodeling the Army guided by the French Military Mission. He resigned as head of the EME in 1929, for disagreeing with the body's decisions relating to the restructuring of military education in the country.

=== Deposition of Washington Luis ===
Dedicated to his professional career and far from political struggles, Tasso Fragoso refused an invitation to participate in the Revolution of 1930. The armed confrontation between government officials and revolutionaries throughout the country, however, ended up making him accept the request of General Mena Barreto who indicated his name to, as the longest-serving officer in the country, assume command of the military operation aimed at pacifying the country, and removing President Washington Luís.

Then, together with General Mena Barreto and Rear Admiral Isaías de Noronha, he headed and led the Junta Governativa that replaced the deposed President and transferred power to Getúlio Vargas, commander of the revolutionary forces.

On 30 March 1931, he returned to head the EME. He then participated in the fight against the Constitutionalist Revolution of 1932, but, considering himself sidelined from the most important decisions of that campaign, he again resigned as head of that body, on 22 August 1932.

=== Judge in the STM ===
On 22 April 1933, he was appointed Minister of the Supreme Military Tribunal (STM), a position he held until 19 February 1938, when he compulsorily retired due to the age limit. In reality, Tasso was 66 years old on that date and not 68, because his father, at the time of his enrollment in the Military School, had increased his age to reach the statutory minimum. His closed ones, aware of the circumstance, insisted that he require rectification. Tasso Fragoso refused the suggestion, claiming it would not be honest, after benefiting for years from his father's appeal, coming out to denounce him and annul him for personal gain.

== Last days ==
He died of an incurable process of arteriosclerosis, and in his last days, there was "a fact that serves to give the final touch to his figure as a true élite man", in the words of the then General Tristão de Alencar Araripe:

“Enlightened intelligence, cultured spirit, General Tasso Fragoso was always opposed to the common creeds of our people, preferring, for the reason of his meditations, the subtle philosophism of the singular genius, who conceived one day the Religion of Humanity (...) But one day, Marina, his dear daughter, due to a treacherous illness, finds herself between life and death (...).

At Marina's bed there were those who trusted more in God than in men. Thus, they remind the afflicted father to make an appeal to God (...). The sworn father had sworn to do everything to rob his daughter from death. Pleading on her behalf to a power he had not known until then was indispensable, as he was told! For she would ask, promising to join the number of those who believe in this God of infinite mercy.

And Marina was saved! We believe that we have fully explained the fact that so gratefully surprised the Carioca society yesterday: General Tasso Fragoso's first communion”.

Tasso Fragoso died in Rio de Janeiro, in 1945, at the age of 76. A street in the neighborhood of Lagoa, where he lived and died, takes his name. The city of Tasso Fragoso, in Maranhão, is a tribute to his name.

== Family ==
He married Josefa Graça Aranha, daughter of Temístocles Maciel Aranha and Maria da Glória de Alencastro Graça. His wife, therefore, was descended from the Baron of Aracati and Maria Adelaide do Carmo de Alencastro who, in turn, was the daughter of José Joaquim de Alencastro and Maria Eduarda Carneiro Leão, from a traditional Pernambucan family.

He had numerous children, of which were mentioned by Marshal Tristão de Alencar Araripe:

- Evangelina, whose union with banker Genésio Pires gave rise to the new Fragoso Pires family: José Carlos, Luiz Paulo, Fernando Tasso and Evangelina Catão. Evangelina (granddaughter) married the deputy, senator and businessman Álvaro Luís Bocaiuva Catão, in this relationship they had a daughter - Theodora Fragoso Pires Bocayuva Catão.
- Murilo, a diplomat, had descendants: Magui and Rosa Maria;
- Beatriz, with descendants: Beatriz;
- Heloisa, who begot Carlos Alberto and Maria Regina;
- Marina.

== Works ==
Among the various technical and historical works he wrote, the following stand out:

- 1904 – Determinação da hora por alturas correspondentes de estrelas diversas 1908 — Determinação de latitude por alturas iguais de duas estrelas (método de Stechert)
- 1922 – A batalha do passo do Rosário
- 1934 – História da guerra entre a Tríplice Aliança e o Paraguai (5 volumes)
- 1938 – A Revolução Farroupilha (1835-1845) — narrativa sintética das operações militares
- 1940 – Revolvendo o passado
- 1965 – Os Franceses no Rio de Janeiro

== Bibliography ==
- ARARIPE, General Tristão de Alencar, Tasso Fragoso - Um pouco de História do Nosso Exército, Biblioteca do Exército Editora, 1960.
- Dicionário Histórico Biográfico Brasileiro pós 1930. 2ª ed. Rio de Janeiro: Ed. FGV, 2001
- KOIFMAN, Fábio, Organizador - Presidentes do Brasil, Editora Rio, 2001.

Preceded by Washington Luís as President	President of the Brazilian Military Junta alongside: Isaías de Noronha, Mena Barreto; 1930	Succeeded by Getúlio Vargas as President
