= João de Deus Mena Barreto =

Brazilian military interim president (1930)

General João de Deus Mena Barreto

Member of the Brazilian Military Junta
- In office 24 October 1930 – 3 November 1930 Serving with Tasso Fragoso, Isaías de Noronha
- Preceded by: Washington Luís (as President)
- Succeeded by: Getúlio Vargas (as President)

Justice of the Superior Military Court
- In office 16 November 1931 – 25 March 1933
- Nominated by: Getúlio Vargas
- Preceded by: Feliciano Mendes de Morais
- Succeeded by: Tasso Fragoso

Federal Intervenor in Rio de Janeiro
- In office 30 May 1931 – 4 November 1931
- Preceded by: Plínio Casado
- Succeeded by: Pantaleão Pessoa

Personal details
- Born: 30 July 1874 Porto Alegre, Rio Grande do Sul, Empire of Brazil
- Died: 25 March 1933 (aged 58) Rio de Janeiro, Federal District, Brazil
- Spouse: Ernestina Estela de Noronha
- Children: 3
- Parent(s): José Luís Mena Barreto (father); Rita de Cássia de Oliveira Melo (mother)

Military service
- Allegiance: Brazil
- Branch/service: Brazilian Army
- Years of service: 1890–1933
- Rank: Divisional general
- Commands: See list: 4th Infantry Regiment; 59th Hunter Battalion; 3rd Infantry Regiment; 2nd Infantry Brigade; 8th Military Region; 1st Military Region
- Battles/wars: Federalist Revolution; Revolt of the Lash; Copacabana Fort Revolt; São Paulo Revolt of 1924; Revolution of 1930

João de Deus Mena Barreto (30 July 1874 – 25 March 1933) was a Brazilian general and politician who briefly served as the president of Brazil while being a member of the provisional military junta of 1930. Born into a historically military family, Mena Barreto took up a military career in 1890. He fought in several internal conflicts, including the Federalist Revolution, a civil war, the 18 of the Copacabana Fort revolt, and a 1924 revolt in the North. With the Revolution of 1930 in Brazil, Mena Barreto and Augusto Tasso Fragoso orchestrated an uprising in the Federal District, overthrowing President Washington Luís and establishing the 1930 junta. After the junta transferred power to revolutionaries, Mena Barreto became the federal interventor for Rio de Janeiro and a mediator in the Constitutionalist Revolution of 1932.

== Early life and career ==
=== Early life ===
João de Deus Mena Barreto was born in Porto Alegre, Rio Grande do Sul, on 30 July 1874, the son of Rita de Cássia de Oliveira Mello and General José Luís Mena Barreto, inspector of Artillery Corps of Rio Grande do Sul. Since the 18th century, with the tradition having begun with João de Deus Barreto Pereira Pinto (1769–1849), Viscount of São Gabriel, many members of his family had pursued a military career; 15 of them achieved generalship. Mena Barreto entered the Tactical and Shooting School of Rio Pardo in January 1890. In May, along with his colleagues, Mena Barreto joined the palace guard loyal to the state government of Francisco da Silva Tavares, trying to subdue a protest movement against the violent repression of a rally that commemorated the second anniversary of the abolition of slavery. In the events which followed, the state government was overthrown and instability ensued until 1892, when Júlio de Castilhos took over as state president.

=== Military career ===
In January 1893, after asking to be excluded from the student body at the military academy, Mena Barreto joined the 4th Infantry Battalion, headquartered in São Gabriel. He participated in the fight against the Federalist Revolution, a civil war in Brazil centered in Rio Grande do Sul and neighboring states. The civil war, from February 1893 to August 1895, pitted federalist insurgents against the Castilhos government. Mena Barreto joined the 1st Line Brigade, which fought federalists, in September 1893. After their victory, Mena Barreto was commissioned as an ensign, and he joined the Military School of Rio de Janeiro, then the Federal District, in March 1898. He was promoted to lieutenant in September 1900, and, two months later, he married Ernestina Estela Noronha Mena Barreto. She was of a family with a long history in the Navy, and Mena Barreto had three children with her. He was assigned to the 32nd Infantry Battalion sent to the Amazon to consolidate the military there after the Acre conflict with Bolivia had finished. He attained the rank of captain in November 1904.

Mena Barreto joined in the repression of the Ilha das Cobras naval battalion's mutiny, shortly after the Revolt of the Lash. By August 1911, Mena Barreto was promoted to major. The following month, he became a deputy to his uncle, the minister of War, and continued in this position after his uncle was replaced in 1912. Afterward, he went back to Rio Grande do Sul to become adjunct professor of physics and chemistry at the Military School of Porto Alegre. Returning to the Federal District, he was promoted to lieutenant colonel in January 1915 and was to command the 4th Infantry Regiment, headquartered in Curitiba, Paraná. In February 1918, Mena Barreto was assigned to organize what was to later become the 12th Infantry Regiment in Belo Horizonte. The next month, he achieved the rank of colonel and took command of the 3rd Infantry Regiment in Rio de Janeiro. In September 1921, he was promoted to brigadier general, and two months later he was appointed inspector of infantry of the 1st and 2nd Military Regions, located in the Federal District and São Paulo, respectively. In February 1922, he received command of the 2nd Infantry Brigade. While serving this post, he was forced to face the 18 of the Copacabana Fort revolt that broke out on 5 July 1922 in Rio and Mato Grosso. The first of a series of tenente revolts, Mena Barreto personally headed a detachment with the purpose of halting the advance of Military School cadets in the Rio neighborhood of Méier.

In July 1924, another revolt broke out in São Paulo. This was accompanied by uprisings in Amazonas and Sergipe. Mena Barreto was made commander-in-chief of the Detachment of the North, made to fight the 27th Battalion of Hunters led by Lieutenants Magalhães Barata and Alfredo Augusto Ribeiro Júnior and other young officers. Mena Barreto arrived on 11 August in Belém, Pará after a revolt there had already been put down, though he still took control of the 8th Military Region and took measures to consolidate the military situation there. On their way to Manaus, Amazonas, loyalist troops occupied the city of Santarém, Pará, on 23 August and made arrests. Meanwhile, the state government in Amazonas had been deposed by rebels and a governing junta was established there led by Ribeiro Júnior. On 28 August, the loyalists arrived in Manuas and arrested members of the junta. Mena Barreto appointed Colonel Raimundo Barbosa as military governor after the deposed state president refused to return. In October, though effective December 1924, Mena Barreto took command of the 1st Military Region. This was just after he achieved the rank of divisional general. The next year, at his suggestion, Soldier's Day was created to celebrate the birthday of the Duke of Caxias on 25 August. He resigned in March 1926 and was replaced by Otávio de Azeredo Coutinho. He took two more positions in 1926. Mena Barreto was elected president of the Military Club, where he normalized the club's activities after it was banned in 1922, and reelected the subsequent year. The other position was inspector of the 1st Group of Military Regions, appointed in November.

== Military junta and later years ==
=== Revolution of 1930 and the military junta ===
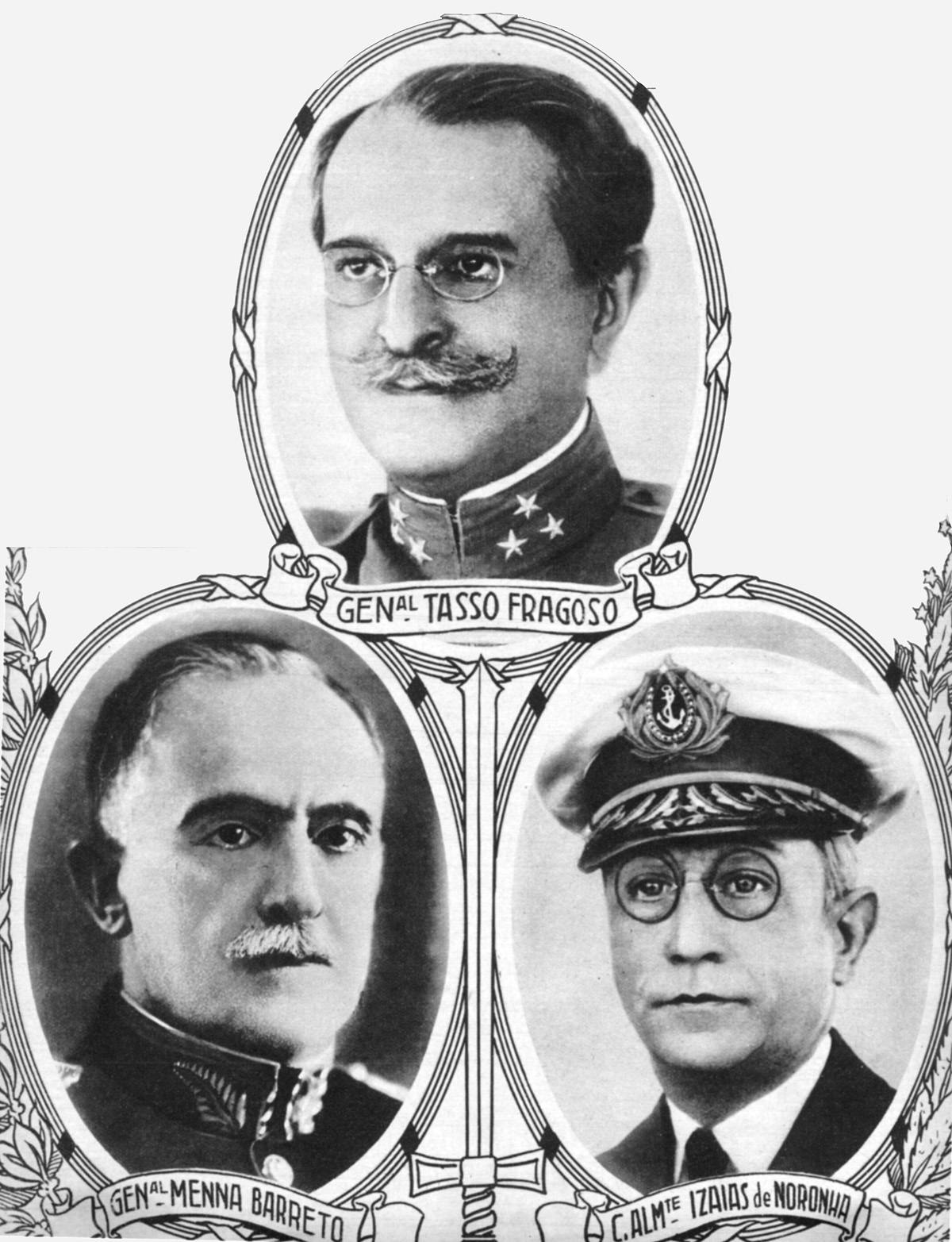
The three members of the military junta. Mena Barreto is on the bottom left; Noronha is bottom right and Tasso Fragoso is top.

At the outbreak of the Revolution of 1930 against President Washington Luís, Mena Barreto was still inspector of the 1st Group of Military Regions. Though his son João de Deus claims his father had no foreknowledge of the revolution, other sources say Mena Barreto was informed of the revolution in advance by emissaries from Rio Grande do Sul. With the situation across Brazil turning favorable to revolutionaries, and Colonel Bertoldo Klinger, Mena Barreto's Chief of Staff, having asked the general on the behalf of a group of young officers to intervene in the revolution to end hostilities, Mena Barreto, alongside other generals in the Federal District, began to support a military coup.

Mena Barreto's sons, Lieutenants Valdemar and João de Deus, made contact with the officialdom as signatures were being collected for a manifesto to force Luís's resignation. Mena Barreto contacted Rear Admiral José Isaías de Noronha as the latter was a relative of his wife. In order to respect the military hierarchy, Mena Barreto had requested two generals superior to him, Augusto Tasso Fragoso and Alexandre Henrique Vieira Leal, to lead the movement. With both declining, Mena Barreto and his son Paulo Emílio again asked Tasso Fragoso on the morning of 23 October. Tasso Fragoso, agreeing, convened with Mena Barreto that night at Fort Copacabana to make the final preparations for their uprising. On 24 October, Mena Barreto and Tasso Fragoso went to the Guanabara Palace and demanded Luís resign, guaranteeing respect for his integrity. After initially refusing, Luís was taken to Fort Copacabana after Cardinal Sebastião da Silveira Cintra acted as an intermediary. Meanwhile, a provisional governing junta composed of Tasso Fragoso as head, Mena Barreto, and Noronha was established in place of the deposed president. During their brief time in power, the junta began to demilitarize Brazil, appointed a provisional ministry, and authorized banking operations to resume among other measures.

=== After the junta ===
The same day they took power, the junta began to exchange telegrams with Getúlio Vargas, revolutionary leader, and proposed the suspension of hostilities. Revolutionaries were unsure of the junta's intentions, so they sent emissaries to the junta to discuss the transfer of power to Vargas while rebels continued advancing toward Rio de Janeiro. On 3 November, the junta handed over power to Vargas, who became president of the Provisional Government. Vargas retained Mena Barreto as inspector of the 1st Group of Military Regions. On 30 May 1931, Mena Barreto was appointed federal interventor of Rio de Janeiro, succeeding Plínio Casado, though he resigned on 4 November of the same year after going against the Code of Interventors, published in August, and was succeeded by Colonel Pantaleão da Silva Pessoa. He was appointed minister of the Supreme Military Court on 7 November 1931. Mena Barreto was neutral during the Constitutionalist Revolution, which had begun in São Paulo in July 1932. In September, he served as a mediator in negotiations to end hostilities which eventually led to an armistice signed on 2 October 1932, ending the conflict with São Paulo's surrender. Mena Barreto died on 25 March 1933 in Rio de Janeiro, still minister of the Supreme Military Court.

Political offices
Preceded by Washington Luís as President	Member of the Brazilian Military Junta alongside: Isaías de Noronha, Tasso Fragoso; 1930	Succeeded by Getúlio Vargas as President
Preceded by Plínio Casado	Federal Intervenor in Rio de Janeiro; 1931	Succeeded by Pantaleão da Silva Pessoa
