= Brazilian military junta of 1930 =

Eleven-day military junta in Brazil

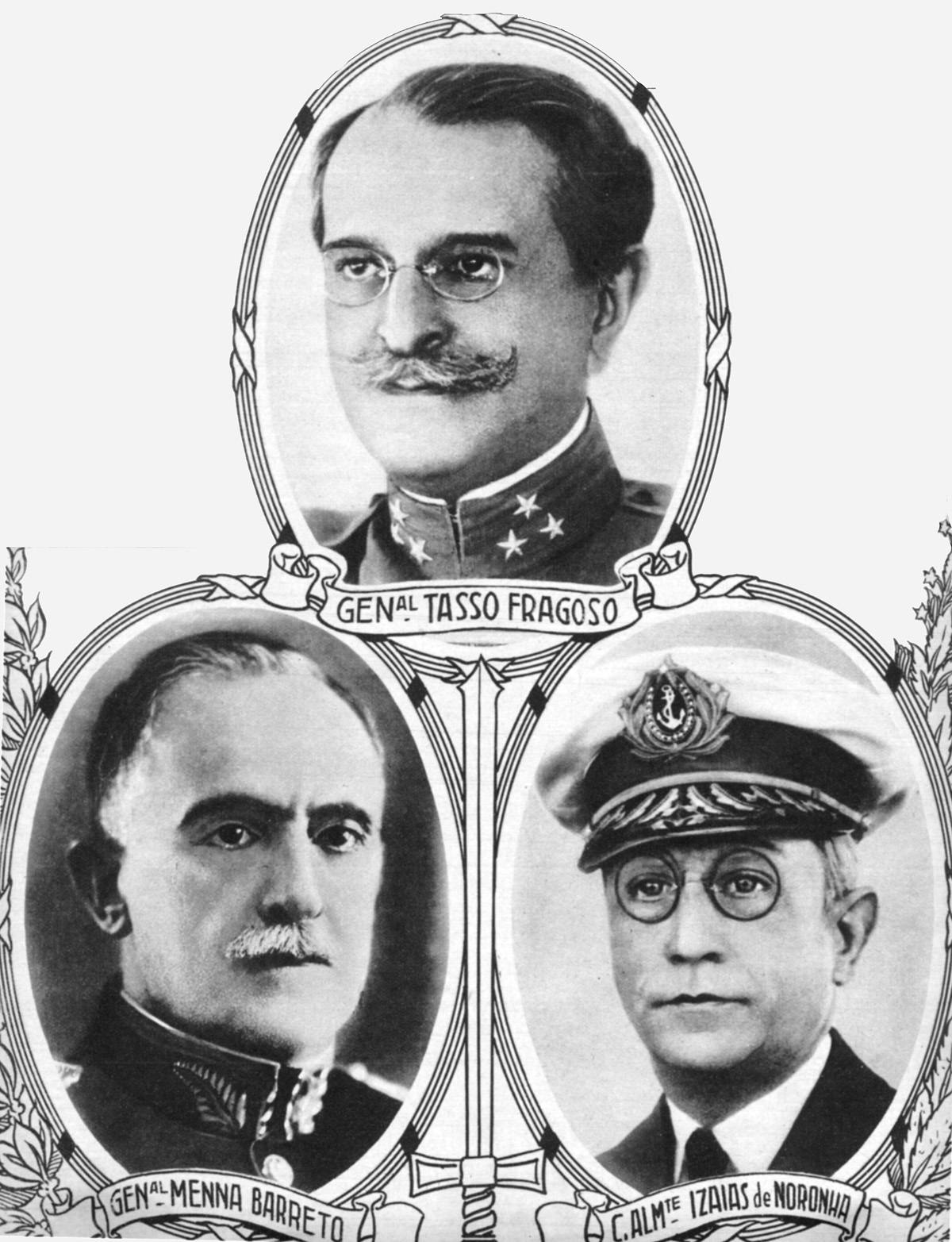
The Brazilian military junta of 1930. Clockwise: General Augusto Tasso Fragoso, leader, Admiral José Isaías de Noronha, and General João de Deus Mena Barreto.

The Brazilian military junta of 1930, also known as the Pacification Junta (Portuguese: Junta Pacificadora), seized power during the Revolution of 1930 and governed Brazil from 24 October to 3 November 1930, when the junta leaders handed power over to revolutionary leader Getúlio Vargas.

The First Brazilian Republic was dominated by an oligarchy that manipulated elections and handpicked the Brazilian presidency. This oligarchy, between politicians from the states of Minas Gerais and São Paulo, was broken when President Washington Luís nominated Júlio Prestes to succeed him. Backed by military rebels, Minas Gerais responded by forming the Liberal Alliance with Paraíba and Rio Grande do Sul, which nominated Getúlio Vargas for the presidency. When Prestes won the March 1930 election, the alliance claimed electoral fraud and orchestrated an armed revolution beginning on 3 October 1930. In Rio de Janeiro, then capital of Brazil, Generals Augusto Tasso Fragoso, head of the junta, João de Deus Mena Barreto, and Admiral Isaías de Noronha decided that Luís had to be removed from the presidency in order to prevent a civil war.

Luís was ousted by the military leaders, who took control of Brazil as a provisional governing body on 24 October, claiming to be the sole power in the country, despite only controlling Rio de Janeiro. The junta initially considered retaining power, but negotiated with revolutionaries to transfer power to Vargas on 3 November 1930 after his arrival in Rio de Janeiro.

== Background ==
Throughout the First Brazilian Republic, the presidency was interchanged every election between politicians of the states of Minas Gerais and São Paulo, in a system called "coffee and milk politics". These two states—the most economically advanced in the country—manipulated elections in their favor and effectively governed Brazil as an oligarchy. Tenentes (English: lieutenants) in the military opposed this system, but their attempted revolts throughout the 1920s were unsuccessful.

The tradition was broken in 1929 when incumbent President Washington Luís, of São Paulo, nominated Júlio Prestes, another man from the same state, as his successor rather than exchanging the position with a politician from Minas Gerais. Luís saw Governor Antônio Carlos Ribeiro de Andrada, the obvious choice from Minas Gerais, as incompetent, favoring Prestes, the governor of São Paulo, who was praised in pro-government newspapers. Luís sought and received support from seventeen states (out of twenty) for Prestes's candidacy. However, his decision was decried by Minas Gerais, Paraíba, and Rio Grande do Sul. With the support of the tenentes, they formed the Liberal Alliance and nominated Getúlio Vargas, governor of Rio Grande do Sul, for president. The coalition advocated reform to education, hygiene, diet, housing, recreation, and working conditions. Their plans included agricultural schools, a national Labor Code, a minimum wage, and industrial training centers; many of their promises would be realized after Vargas took power in 1930. Prestes promised to continue Luís's economic policies, lower taxes, raise the salaries of government officials, update army equipment and defend industry. His platform was alike to that of the Liberal Alliance.

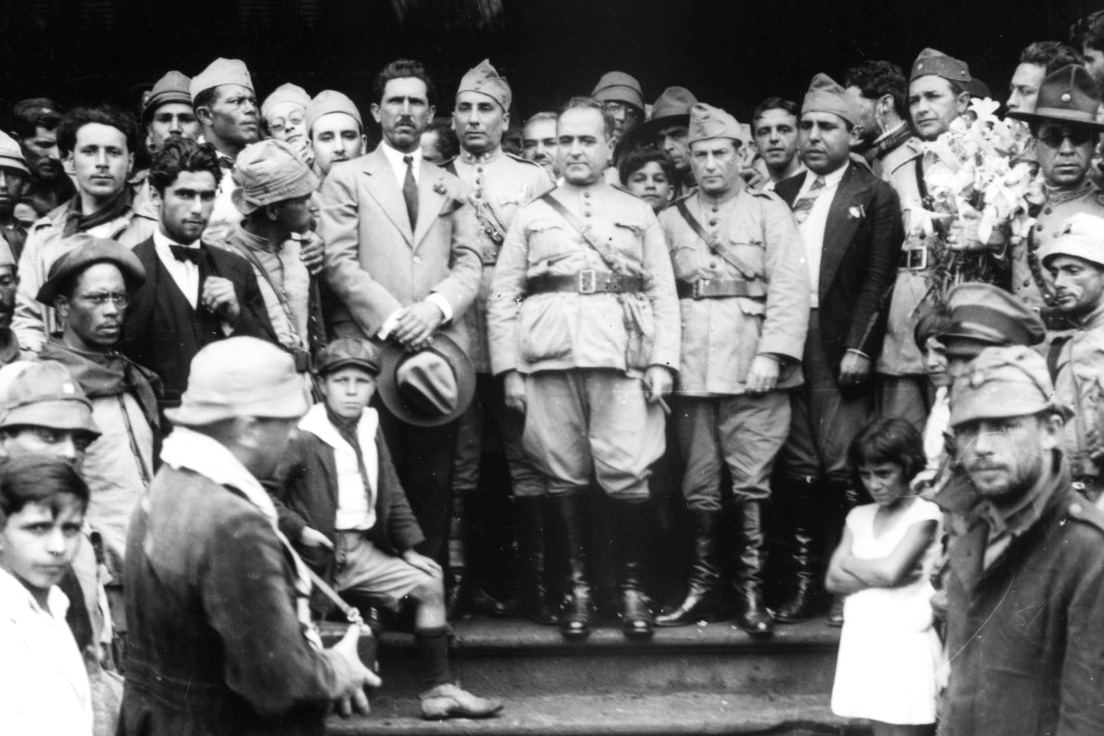
Getúlio Vargas (center) and his followers in Itararé on the way to Rio de Janeiro after the Revolution of 1930

In March 1930, Prestes won the election against Vargas in an election marred by electoral fraud from both sides, with Vargas reportedly having won Rio Grande do Sul 298,627 to 982 votes. On 26 July 1930, Vargas's running mate João Pessoa was assassinated. Despite the assassination having been the result of both a romantic and local political ordeal, Pessoa's death was the catalyst that led the opposition to take up arms. Before this, Vargas had decided the opposition did not have the power to contest the election. The federal government received backlash for the assassination, widely perceived to be a political act, and in Congress, Rio Grande do Sul Deputy Lindolfo Collor asked, "Mr. President, what have you done to the governor of Paraíba [Pessoa]?" Pessoa's uncle Epitácio Pessoa proclaimed that his nephew's murder was "nourished by the systemic and criminal hostility of the federal government toward the governor of Paraíba." Pessoa became a martyr to the opposition and his death was exploited politically.

The opposition now planned for an attack on the federal government. The Revolution of 1930, as it was called, began in the states of the Liberal Alliance and then moved toward Rio de Janeiro from north, south, and west. Rio Grande do Sul was captured within 48 hours. Revolutionaries swiftly took control of the Northeast under the command of Juarez Távora. There was minor resistance to the revolution in Minas Gerais. In São Paulo, the Democratic Party, who had supported Vargas, abstained from any revolutionary activity.

=== Prelude to a military coup ===
On 19 October, the popular Cardinal Sebastião Leme, archbishop of Rio de Janeiro, arrived in the capital from Rome. Two days earlier, he was convinced that, in the interest of peace, he should procure Luís's resignation. When Leme proposed his resignation, the president replied, "What! Then Your Eminence doubts the loyalty of my generals!"

Many generals believed the president's continued stubbornness was not helping the situation, and they feared a civil war. General Augusto Tasso Fragoso, former Army Chief of Staff, had told Collor that he may join the revolution if it became nationwide. Though Tasso Fragoso stated his opposition to the armed overthrow of constitutional authorities, he said he would "take the attitude which his patriotism indicated." However, Tasso Fragoso told General João de Deus Mena Barreto, inspector of the 1st Group of Military Regions, that a rebellion in Rio seemed imminent after he attended mass for a soldier killed in Paraíba. Mena Barreto was being urged by his Chief of Staff Colonel Bertoldo Klinger, on behalf of a group of young officers, to intervene to end the hostilities in a military coup favorable to revolutionaries. Concerned about the military hierarchy, Mena Barreto suggested Tasso Fragoso, the most senior officer, head the movement. When he refused, he asked Army Chief of Staff Alexandre Henrique Xavier Leal, who also refused. Finally, on the morning of 23 October, Mena Barreto and one of his sons, Paulo Emílio, convinced Tasso Fragoso to take charge. Mena Barreto also made contact with Admiral Isaías de Noronha through his wife, a relative of Noronha, establishing a link with the Navy. What was being proposed by the officers was a "pacification coup." Tasso Fragoso, Mena Barreto, and their associates convened on the night of 23 October at Fort Copacabana to make plans for the ousting, having received assurance of support from the military police and the outlying barracks at Vila Militar.

== The junta ==
=== Capitulation of Luís and the junta's formation ===
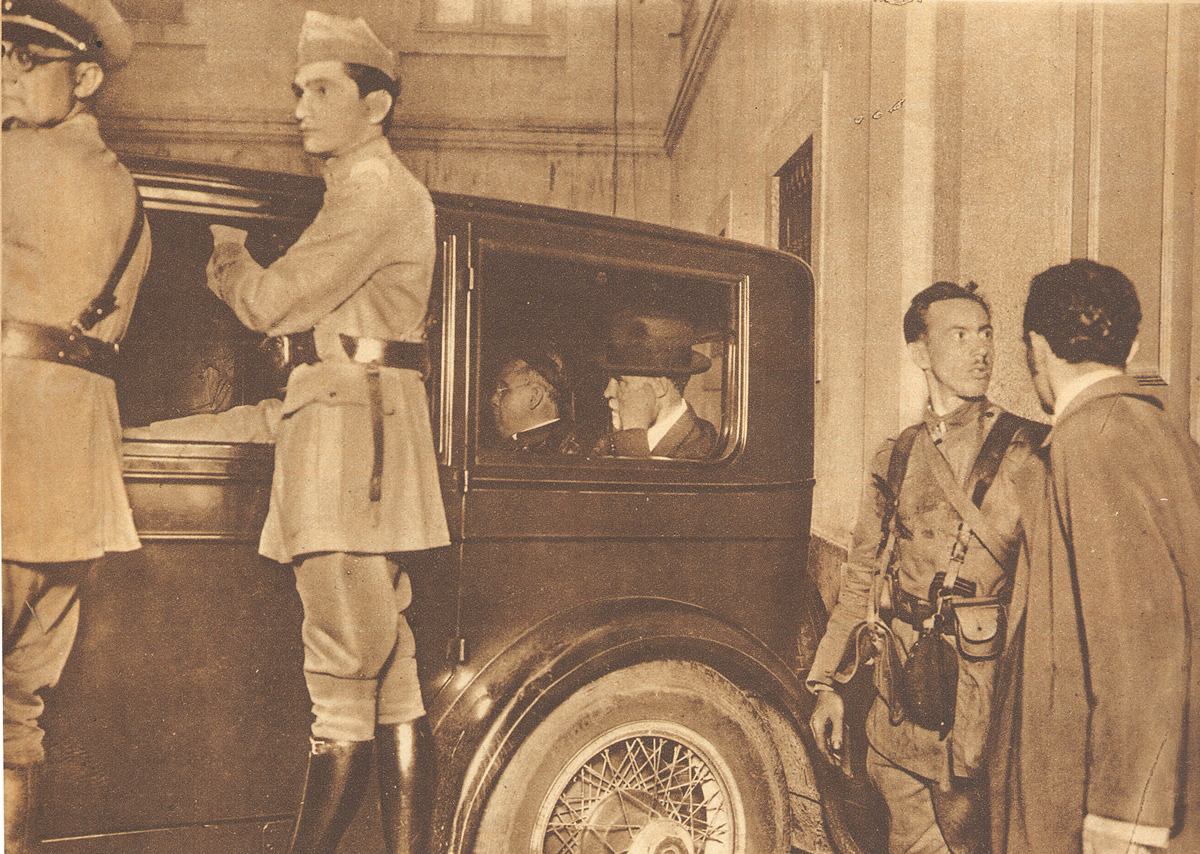
Washington Luís (back of the car, hand on his head) sitting with Sebastião Leme as they leave the Guanabara Palace

The operation to depose the president began on the morning of 24 October. Before dawn, the Minister of War and commander of the 1st Military Region came to talk with Luís, and it became clear the president's position was untenable. Shortly before 9 a.m., Leme called to speak with Minister of Foreign Affairs Otávio Mangabeira. Leme told Mangabeira that he heard that Fort Copacabana ordered the president leave by 11 a.m., and, as a warning, they would begin shooting blank rounds after 9 a.m. Luís decided to evacuate his wife and other women in Guanabara Palace, his residence, to their friends' house in Cosme Velho. Blank rounds were shot as they left, frightening civilians in Rio.

While mobs were burning government newspapers, rebel troops were moved from the regiment at Praia Vermelha to the Guanabara Palace. The movement was hindered by crowds of armed civilians hoping to join the march. Luís gathered those present at the palace and allowed them to leave, but none did. Though the president was told he could count on 2,600 soldiers, the police brigade defending the Guanabara Palace capitulated to the insurrectionists. Tasso Fragoso and Mena Barreto, as well as Alfredo Malan d'Angrogne, entered the palace. They found Luís in a small, gloomy room, surrounded by his cabinet, sons, a few friends, and congressmen. Outside, the taunting cries of the crowd could be heard.

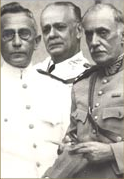
From left: Noronha, Tasso Fragoso, and Mena Barreto, the three members of the junta.

According to historian John W. F. Dulles, "The President remained every inch the proud man who would fulfill his duty as he saw it." Luís said to his ministers, "Only in pieces I leave here." He mistakenly claimed that there were still soldiers to defend his government. Tasso Fragoso later explained, "No one wanted his son to put on a uniform and die fighting a man frankly divorced from the common interest." After bowing, Tasso Fragoso offered Luís his life, to which the president proclaimed, "The last thing I cherish at a time like this is my life. My blood will soak the soil so that a better Brazil may emerge, a true national regeneration." After Luís refused to resign and tensions climaxed, the General replied, "Your Excellency will be responsible for the consequences," to which Luís accepted. Bowing again, Tasso Fragoso left.

That afternoon, Cardinal Leme, calling on the president at Tasso Fragoso's request, told him the generals had established their provisional government junta on the first floor of the Guanabara Palace. He used his influence with Luís to ease him out of office in safety. Noting the ugly mood of the crowd, Leme said Fort Copacabana would be the safest place for the president, and he was able to get the generals to agree that he would be allowed to set sail for Europe without delay. Those who were by his side concurred, and at 5 p.m., he agreed and was driven to Fort Copacabana. In the presidential limousine with Luís were Leme, Tasso Fragoso, and several others. The president explained to Leme, "Since this morning, I have been a prisoner in this room, with the palace and gardens invaded by troops. I leave, bowing to violence."

=== Government ===
Tasso Fragoso, head of the junta, Mena Barreto, and Noronha declared themselves a "pacifying junta" with a "moderating power", despite not controlling any territory outside Rio de Janeiro. São Paulo Governor Hastínfilo de Moura, who was appointed by the junta, was unpopular because Moura had commanded federal forces fighting rebels in the Paraná–São Paulo area. After protests ensued, he left office on 28 October. Klinger told the press on the same day that "the false rumor that the Governing Junta will be summarily replaced and will turn over the reins of government to Getúlio Vargas" was ungrounded. Among other measures, the junta dismissed the reserves called by Luís during the last days of his government, demilitarized the South Minas Gerais Railway Network, authorized banking operations to resume, opened a line of credit to counter yellow fever, and replaced some military commanders.

The revolutionaries were caught off guard by the sudden nature of the coup. A major rebel offensive on the Paraná–São Paulo border was prevented by bad weather from 20–24 October. The attack, in progress by 25 October, was called off when the rebels heard of the coup in the capital. Refusing to recognize the junta, Távora proceeded to lead his troops into Salvador, capital of Bahia. Vargas, in charge of the revolution, telegraphed on 24 October that the members of the junta would be "accepted as collaborators and not directors," that they "joined the revolution at the time when its success was assured," and that he would listen to any proposals the junta had before setting out for São Paulo the next day. The junta responded on 27 October, declaring that they would await the arrival of Vargas for any further action to be taken in arranging the government. Several more messages would be exchanged between Vargas and the junta.

The junta's attempts at consolidating power proved unsuccessful. Pressured by popular demonstration, troops entering the capital, and the opposition of Vargas, the government held talks with Collor and Oswaldo Aranha, Vargas's longtime personal friend, on 28 October to form a new government. Aranha told the junta on 28 October that revolutionaries could not "stop in the middle of the road". While talks were being held with Aranha, the junta contradicted Klinger's earlier statement and promised to hand over the government to Vargas. The United States Ambassador to Brazil, Edwin Vernon Morgan, reported to the US Secretary of State a message from Foreign Minister Afrânio de Melo Franco, which included the statement, "Allow me also to inform Your Excellency that the junta recognizes and respects all national obligations contracted abroad, existing treaties with foreign powers, the public debt, foreign and domestic, existing contracts and other obligations legally entered into."

Ministers of the military junta
Office	Name	Term
Minister of Agriculture, Industry and Commerce	Paulo de Moraes Barros	24 October – 3 November 1930
Minister of Finance	Agenor Lafayete de Roure	25 October – 3 November 1930
Minister of War	José Fernandes Leite de Castro	24 October – 3 November 1930
Minister of Justice and Internal Affairs	Gabriel Loureiro Bernardes	24–26 October 1930
Afrânio de Melo Franco	26 October – 3 November 1930
Minister of the Navy	José Isaías de Noronha	25 October–3 November 1930
Minister of Transport and Public Works	Paulo de Moraes Barros	25 October – 3 November 1930
Minister of External Relations	Afrânio de Melo Franco	24 October – 3 November 1930

== Transition of power ==
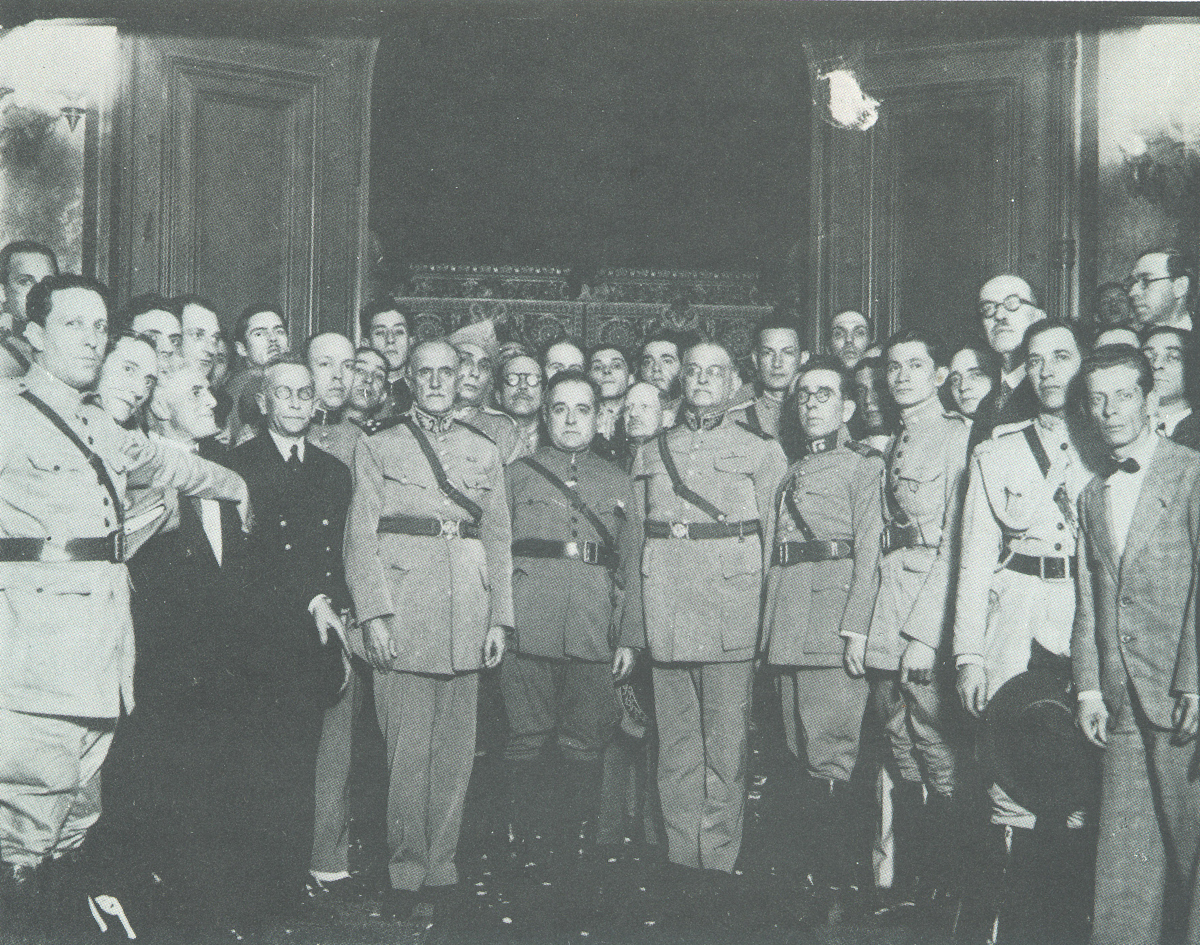
Vargas and the military junta. Noronha is the man in the black suit and tie, and right of him are standing Mena Barreto, Vargas, and Tasso Fragoso.

Vargas refused to enter Rio de Janeiro until it was controlled by troops from Rio Grande do Sul. He arrived in the capital to popular acclaim on the morning of the 31 October after 3,000 troops had secured it. Vargas and his comrades hitched their horses to the obelisk at the foot of Avenida Rio Branco to declare victory, and Vargas arrived at the Catete Palace the same day. On 3 November 1930, the junta handed power over to Vargas, putting an end to the First Brazilian Republic and beginning Vargas's presidency. In a speech to mark the transition, Tasso Fragoso proclaimed the military intervened with the hope that "Brazilians cease spilling blood on behalf of a cause which was not endorsed by the national conscience." He also said that Luís had "acted as a veritable king, with complete disdain for everything and everybody." Vargas praised the junta for avoiding further loss of life.

Vargas chose not to assume the role of president as if the 1930 election had made him the victor and governing by the 1891 constitution. Instead, he set up a Provisional Government with emergency powers of which he was the leader, holding legislative and executive powers. The constitution was suspended to effect a complete break from the past. The judiciary remained, though Aranha favored the abolition of the Supreme Court and Vargas ended up removing four judges from it and dismissing various magistrates from lower courts.

== Aftermath and legacy ==
All three members of the junta later held other political offices. Mena Barreto was appointed federal intervenor for Rio de Janeiro in 1931, minister of the Supreme Military Court the same year, and, finally, a mediator in the 1932 Constitutionalist Revolution between São Paulo and the federal government. Tasso Fragoso became chief of the Army General Staff under Vargas, but resigned the next year. He would be appointed minister — and later vice president — of the Supreme Military Court. Tasso Fragoso retired in 1938 and became devoted to historical research. Noronha was minister of the Navy under Vargas until his dismissal in December 1930; he was retired in 1941.

The involvement of the military was summarized by historian Thomas Skidmore:

As in 1889, when the Republic replaced the Empire, control at the critical moment was assumed by the higher military and then transferred to a new cadre of civilian politicians. In 1930, Army and Navy commanders found themselves cast in a position which was to become increasingly familiar in subsequent Brazilian history: the role of final arbiter in domestic politics.

Political offices
Preceded by Washington Luís	Head of State and Government of Brazil; 1930	Succeeded by Getúlio Vargas
