= Brazilian cruiser República =

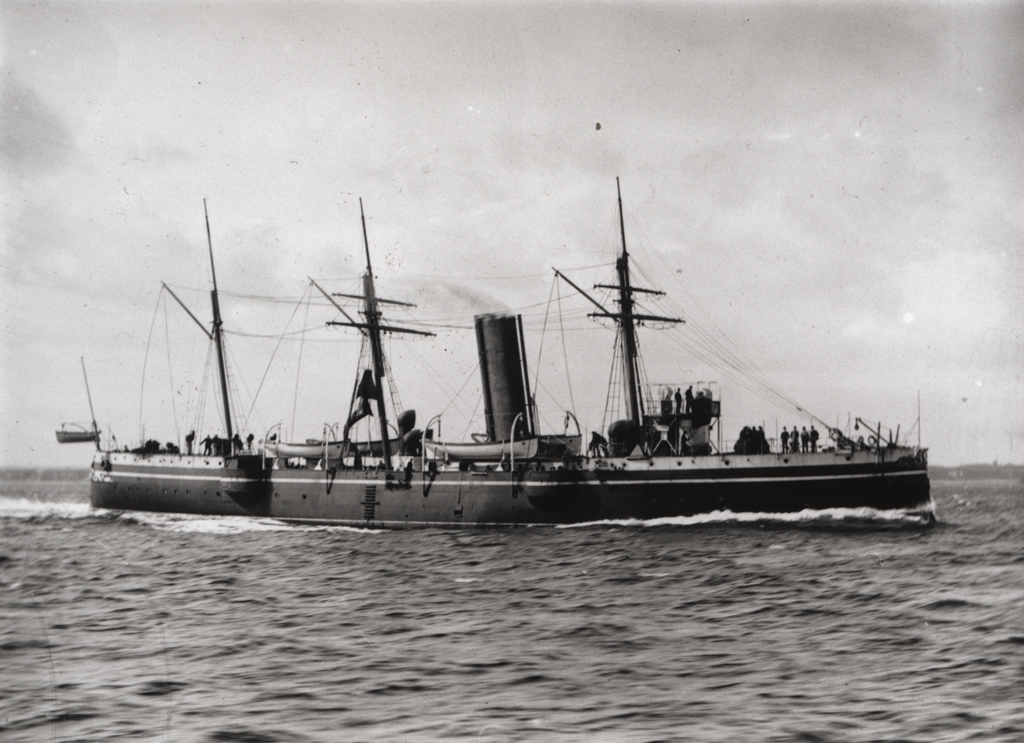

History

Brazil
- Name: República
- Namesake: Proclamation of the Republic
- Builder: Armstrong Whitworth
- Launched: 1892
- Decommissioned: 1920

General characteristics
- Class & type: Cruiser
- Displacement: 1,231 tons
- Length: 68.58 m (225 ft 0 in)
- Beam: 10.67 m (35 ft 0 in)
- Draft: 4.57 m (15 ft 0 in)
- Installed power: 3,800 hp (2,800 kW)
- Propulsion: Mixed steam-sail
- Speed: 16 knots (30 km/h; 18 mph)
- Complement: 135
- Armament: 6 × 120 mm Armstrong guns; 4 × 1 – 57 mm Nordenfelt; 6 × 1 – machine guns; 4 × 440 mm torpedo tubes

República was a cruiser operated by the Brazilian Navy. It was built by Armstrong Whitworth, in Newcastle-upon-Tyne, in the United Kingdom, and launched in 1892. Named in honor of the Proclamation of the Republic of 1889, being the only ship in the Brazilian Navy to bear this name.

== Design ==
República was classified as a 2nd class cruiser, measuring 68.58 meters (225 ft 0 in) in length, 10.67 meters (35 ft 0 in) in beam, 5.19 meters (17 ft 0 in) in depth and 4.57 meters (15 ft 0 in) in draft, with a displacement of 1,231 tons. Its steel armor was 2.5 inches (64 mm) thick at the deck. Equipped with a hybrid propulsion system, combining sails and steam engines, it reached a power of 3,800 horsepower (2,800 kW) and a maximum speed of 16 knots (30 km/h; 18 mph). Its artillery included six 120 mm Armstrong guns, four 57 mm Nordenfelt guns, six machine guns and four 440 mm torpedo tubes, and was operated by a crew of 132 sailors.

== Career ==
In April 1893, República participated in the first Naval Review of Hampton Roads, in the United States, alongside the battleship Aquidabã and the cruiser Tiradentes. Later that year, during the Naval Revolt, it played an important role in actions such as the bombing of the Santa Cruz Fortress and the retaking of the city of Desterro (today Florianópolis). Under the command of Frigate Captain Álvaro Belfor, it captured the rebel steamship Jupiter. In 1894, it sank the gunboat Cananéia and its name was temporarily changed to Quinze de Novembro.

The ship regained its original name in 1895. The following year, it was part of a Naval Division under the command of Rear Admiral Júlio de Noronha, together with the battleship Aquidabã and the cruiser Tiradentes, representing Brazil in a Naval Review led by U.S. president Grover Cleveland during the World's Columbian Exposition.

Between 1901 and 1902, República underwent modernization in the Casa Laje workshops, on Viana Island, with changes to its rigs. In 1908, it was updated again by the same shipyard. In 1910, it was incorporated into the Amazonas Flotilla, and, in 1913, it underwent repairs at the Guanabara Dike, at the Rio de Janeiro Navy Arsenal, including scraping and painting the hull. During this period, it remained docked in Rio de Janeiro, without carrying out missions. In 1914, it continued under maintenance until the end of the year.

In September 1915, República was reincorporated into the Amazonas Flotilla through Notice No. 3,381. In 1920, after the Disarmament Exhibition, it formally ended its military career. However, in 1922, the ship performed a last prominent mission by supporting the historic crossing of the Atlantic carried out by Portuguese aviators Gago Coutinho and Sacadura Cabral, positioning itself close to the Saint Peter and Saint Paul Archipelago.

== See also ==
- List of historical ships of the Brazilian Navy
