= Afrânio de Melo Franco =

Brazilian diplomat (1870–1943)

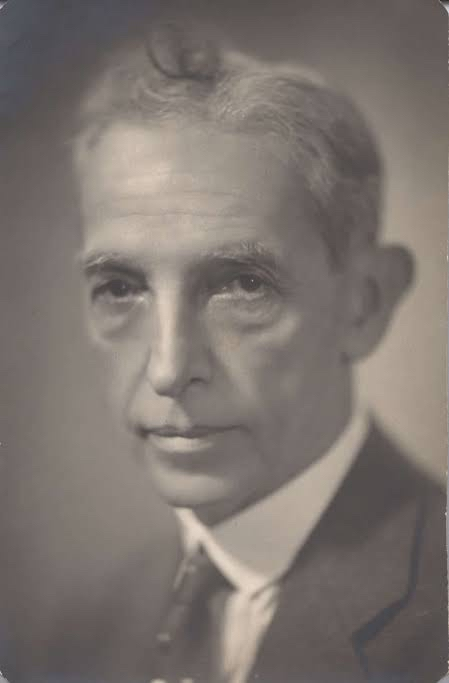

Minister of Foreign Affairs
- In office 24 October 1930 – 28 December 1933
- President: Getúlio Vargas
- Preceded by: Otávio Mangabeira
- Succeeded by: Félix de Barros Cavalcanti de Lacerda

Personal details
- Born: Afrânio de Melo Franco; 25 February 1870 Paracatu, Minas Gerais, Empire of Brazil
- Died: 1 January 1943 (aged 72) Rio de Janeiro, Federal District, Brazil
- Spouse: Sílvia de Miranda Cesário Alvim
- Education: Faculty of Law of São Paulo
- Profession: Diplomat; politician

Afrânio de Melo Franco (February 25, 1870 – January 1, 1943) was a Brazilian diplomat and politician. He served as Minister of Transport and Public Works from 1918 to 1919, as Minister of Foreign Affairs from 1930 to 1933, and as Minister of Justice in 1932. During the government of Delfim Moreira, Melo Franco took on many duties due to the president's health problems, becoming informally known as the ''prime-minister of Brazil''. From 1924 to 1926, he served as ambassador of Brazil to the League of Nations in Geneva.

== Biography ==
=== Early life ===
Born in Paracatu into a wealthy political family, he was the son of the senator Virgílio Martins de Mello Franco. His brother, Afonso Arinos, was a prominent regionalist writer. In Barbacena, he studied at the Colégio Abílio, and later graduated from the Faculty of Law of São Paulo, where he became acquainted with Antônio Carlos Ribeiro de Andrada and joined the Freemason society Burschenschaft Paulista. He was active in both the abolitionist and the republican movements.

=== Career ===
While in Ouro Preto, he participated in the establishment of the Faculty of Law of Minas Gerais, now based in Belo Horizonte. In 1891, he began his career as a public prosecutor in Conselheiro Lafaiete, but later abandoned it to pursue a career in diplomacy. He served as second secretary at the embassy in Montevideo and Brussels. In 1906, he was elected as a federal deputy for Minas Gerais and served eight consecutive terms until 1929. During this period, he was a member of the Commission on Diplomacy and International Treaties, a body assigned with examining treaties and discussing foreign policy, and he also served as general-rapporteur for the project of the Civil Code, elaborated by Clovis Bevilacqua.

In 1917, he traveled to La Paz to represent Brazil in the inauguration ceremony of José Gutiérrez Guerra, and later visited Santiago, Buenos Aires, and Montevideo on diplomatic missions.
