= Revolution of 1930 =

Armed insurrection which ended the First Brazilian Republic

Brazilian Revolution
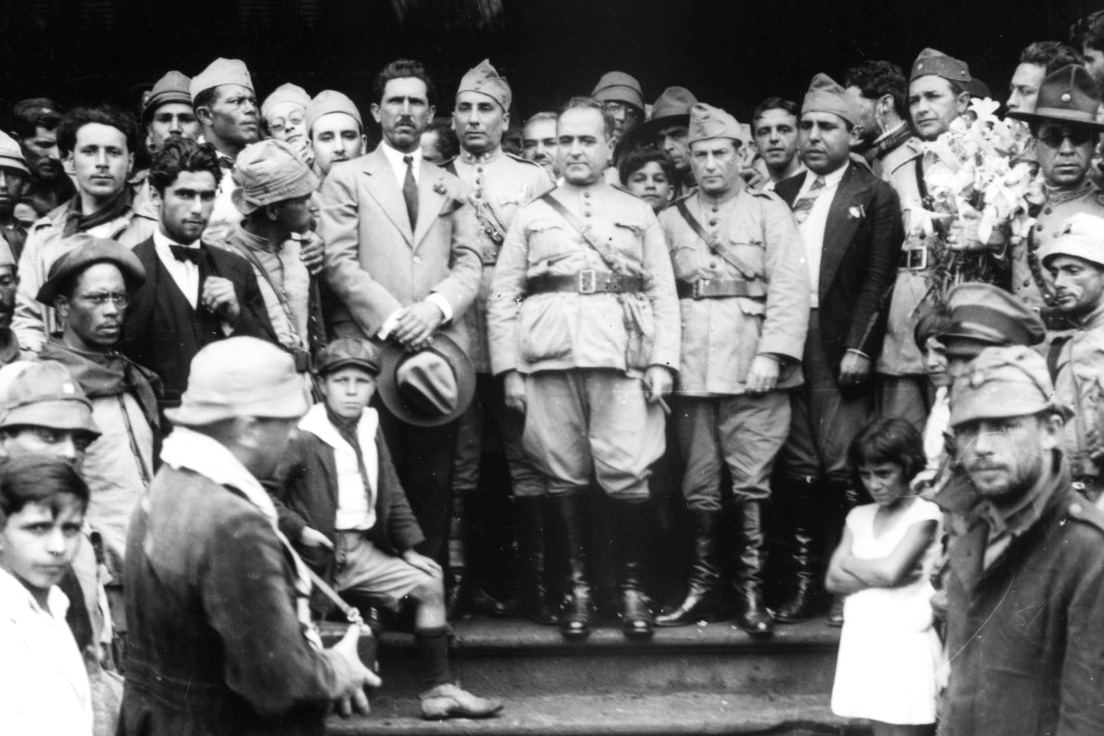
- Getúlio Vargas (center) and his followers pictured by Claro Jansson during their short stay in Itararé, São Paulo en route to Rio de Janeiro after a successful military campaign.
| Date | 3 October – 24 October 1930 |
| Location | Military confrontations mainly in the states of Rio Grande do Sul, Minas Gerais, Paraná, Pernambuco and Paraíba. |
| Result | Revolutionary victory: Getúlio Vargas becomes president of Brazil |

Belligerents
| Revolutionaries; Minas Gerais; Paraíba; Rio Grande do Sul; Public Forces | Brazil; São Paulo; Public Forces | Armed Forces |

Commanders and leaders
| Getúlio Vargas; Olegário Maciel; Osvaldo Aranha; Juarez Távora; Góis Monteiro; Plínio Tourinho | Washington Luís; Júlio Prestes | Tasso Fragoso; Mena Barreto; Isaías de Noronha |

Strength
| ~50,000 | Unknown | Over 2,600 |

The Revolution of 1930 (Portuguese: Revolução de 1930) was an armed insurrection across Brazil that ended the Old Republic. The revolution replaced incumbent president Washington Luís with defeated presidential candidate and revolutionary leader Getúlio Vargas, concluding the political hegemony of a four-decade-old oligarchy and beginning the Vargas Era.

For most of the late 19th and early 20th centuries, Brazilian politics had been controlled by an alliance between the states of São Paulo and Minas Gerais. The presidency had alternated between them every election until 1929, when incumbent President Washington Luís declared his successor would be Júlio Prestes, also from São Paulo. In response to the betrayal of the oligarchy, Minas Gerais, Rio Grande do Sul, and Paraíba formed a Liberal Alliance backing opposition candidate Getúlio Vargas, president of Rio Grande do Sul.

The Alliance denounced the victory of Prestes in the March 1930 presidential election as fraudulent. They went no further though until late July, when Vargas's running mate, João Pessoa, was assassinated. The assassination was largely due to a personal feud, but Pessoa became a martyr for the revolutionary cause. On 3 October, Rio Grande do Sul, under the leadership of Vargas and Góis Monteiro, rebelled. By the next day, the revolution had reached the North and Northeast under Juarez Távora, and Minas Gerais formally declared allegiance to the revolution within a week of its start, despite minor resistance.

Military officers, acting independently of both the government and the revolutionaries, worried about the possibility of a protracted civil war, swiftly led a military coup to depose Luís in Rio de Janeiro, on 24 October. Hoping to deter further bloodshed, three higher military officers, Generals Augusto Tasso Fragoso, João de Deus Mena Barreto, and Admiral Isaías de Noronha formed a military junta and briefly ruled the country, for less than two weeks. After negotiations between the revolutionaries and the junta, Vargas arrived in Rio and took power from the junta on 3 November. For the following seven years, Vargas achieved an unprecedented consolidation of power with transitional governments until he proclaimed the Estado Novo in 1937 in a coup d'état. Vargas remained in power until he was forced out of office in 1945.

== Causes ==
=== Economic crisis ===
By 1900, Brazil was producing 75% of the world's coffee. However, the price of coffee had dropped, and in 1906, the two largest coffee-producing states, Rio de Janeiro and Minas, signed an agreement to limit exports and production to manipulate the price of coffee. The attempt to raise the price of coffee failed but prevented it from declining even further.

Brazil's economy saw great improvements in the 1920s. Although still dependent on coffee exports, the world prices for Brazil's coffee had more than doubled by 1925, with slight decline afterward. The economy saw turmoil with the Wall Street Crash of 1929, and coffee prices declined sharply as the economy failed. The mobilization of industrial workers throughout that period was another leading cause of the revolution.

Osvaldo Aranha, who became the first Minister of Justice and Internal Affairs after the revolution, described the state of the country shortly after the revolution:

The country was without money, without exchange, actually and legally in a moratorium with pressing promises to be met abroad, due or to become due in a few days; a floating debt, federal, state, and local, which had never been calculated; coffee in three crisies—prices, overproduction, and large stocks in warehouses; Brazilian economy, industry, and labor in ruin; and an unemployment crisis.

— Osvaldo Aranha

=== "Coffee with milk" tradition ===
The political life of the First Republic (1889–1930) was dominated by an alliance between the states of São Paulo and Minas Gerais. An oligarchic practice known as coffee with milk politics, it combined coffee producers in São Paulo with the dairy industry that dominated Minas Gerais. Taking advantage of their economic power and influence, it allowed the two states to alternate the presidency between each other.

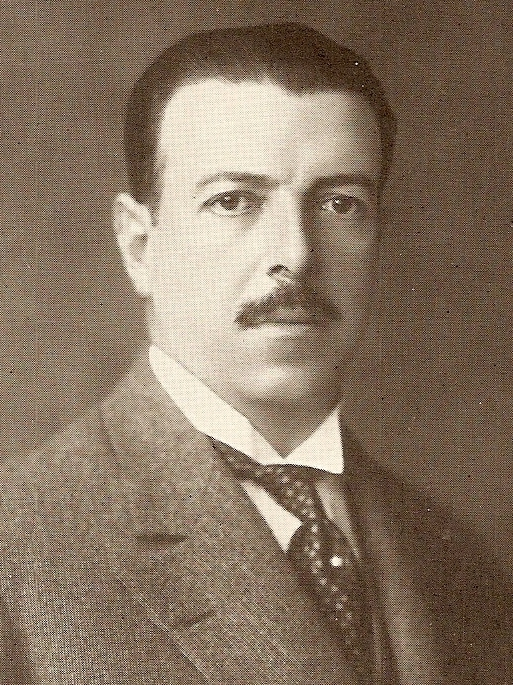
Júlio Prestes, the 1930 Presidential Republican Party of São Paulo candidate, supported by Washington Luís and São Paulo.

The paulista Washington Luís won the 1926 Brazilian presidential election with 98% of the vote, and his administration was an unusual period of prosperity, domestic peace, and tranquility. In accordance with the coffee with milk tradition, the candidate for the 1930 election should have been Antônio Carlos Ribeiro, the Governor of Minas Gerais. However, Ribeiro's backing for mandatory religious instruction in state public schools, coupled with the close relationship between Luis and Júlio Prestes, the Governor of São Paulo, led the Republican Party of São Paulo to support Prestes instead.

That created an anti-Prestes opposition, mainly in Minas Gerais, Paraíba, and Rio Grande do Sul. The three states formed a Liberal Alliance backing Getúlio Vargas, the Governor of Rio Grande do Sul, as President of Brazil. João Pessoa, a politician from Paraíba, was selected as his running mate. In 1929, Ribeiro made a speech in which he stated:

Allow the revolution by vote, before the people do so through violence.

— Antônio Carlos Ribeiro

=== Tenentism ===
Dissent in the Brazilian military led to an ideology of tenentism. The movement consisted of young officers (tenentes, meaning lieutenants) opposed to the oligarchic federal system of coffee and milk politics. In 1922, the first of several military revolts by representatives of tenentism took place at Fort Copacabana in Rio de Janeiro and cost the lives of 16 young officers who were part the movement. The tenentes would later back Vargas's nomination for the presidency and assist in the revolution.

=== 1930 general election ===
The presidential elections were held on March 1, 1930 and gave the victory to Prestes, who received 1,091,709 votes against 742,794 given to Vargas. Notoriously, Vargas had almost 100% of the votes in Rio Grande do Sul, 287,321 to Prestes's 789.

The Liberal Alliance refused to accept the validity of the elections and claiming that Prestes' victory had been due to fraud. In reality, both sides had manipulated the electorate. That led to a conspiracy based in Rio Grande do Sul and Minas Gerais. However, a setback to the conspiracy occurred as Siqueira Campos, a revolutionary, died in a plane crash.

On July 26, 1930, João Pessoa, Vargas's running mate in the 1930 election, was assassinated by João Dantas in Recife for political and personal reasons. That became the flashpoint for armed mobilization, and anarchy had ensued in the capital of Paraíba as a result of the murder. Paraíba's capital was also renamed João Pessoa in his honor. Pessoa's murder contributed to creating a favorable climate for revolution and promoted social change, as the government was deemed responsible for his murder.

== Revolution ==
The 1930 revolution was planned to have begun on August 26, but the date was delayed to allow the Brigada Militar of Rio Grande do Sul to participate in the movement. Vargas, now in charge of picking a date, decided to begin instead at 5:30 p.m. on October 3 in Rio Grande do Sul.

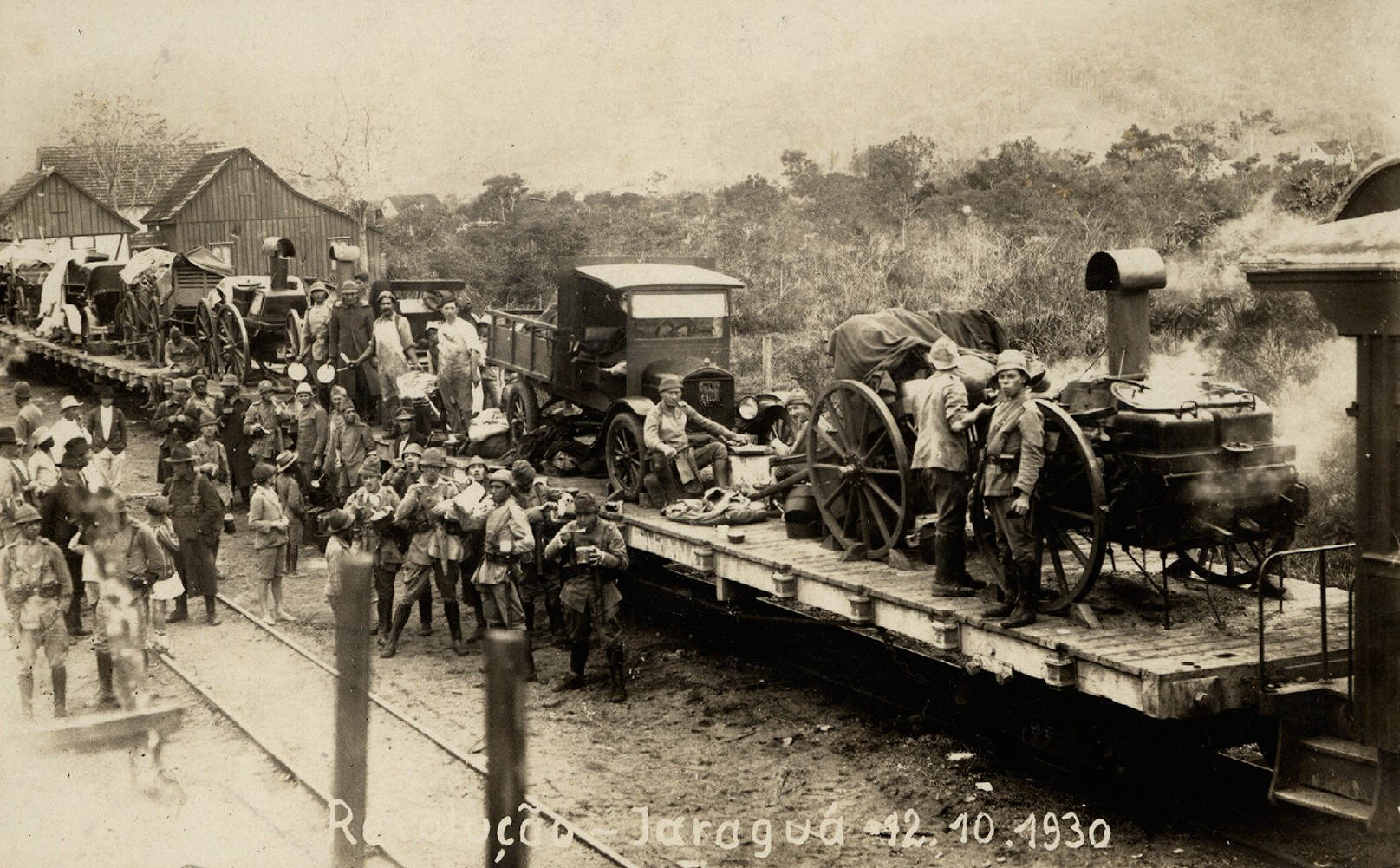
Army troops being deployed in southern Brazil.

=== Southern Brazil ===
Vargas lured General Gil de Almeida, who was in charge of the Brazilian third military region, into a false sense of security at Porto Alegre, the capital of Rio Grande do Sul. Then, at 10:00 p.m. on October 3, the revolutionaries had claimed the city of Porto Alegre and had defeated Almeida and his gaucho troops, at a cost of 20 people dead.

Aranha and Flores da Cunha led an attack on the military headquarters in the state alongside 50 men and captured the headquarters and its commander. João Alberto led a movement with members of the Brigada that successfully captured an arms store on the Menino Deus hill. On October 8, the Ministry of War continued to report the military forces in Rio Grande do Sul were still loyal to the government. In reality, however, the revolutionaries had controlled the entire state by October 10. At São Borja, a small resistance was formed, but the besieged regiment fled across the River Uruguay to Argentina.

The revolution proceeded relatively smoothly in the state of Santa Catarina. At the coastal capital of the state, Florianópolis, however, Admiral Heraclito Belford refused Aranha's request to come into the capital and fired on revolutionaries approaching the town although the revolution had control of most of the state. Belford, with five destroyers, a scout vessel, and a cruiser, delayed movement into the capital and remained until October 24, when electricity was cut off.

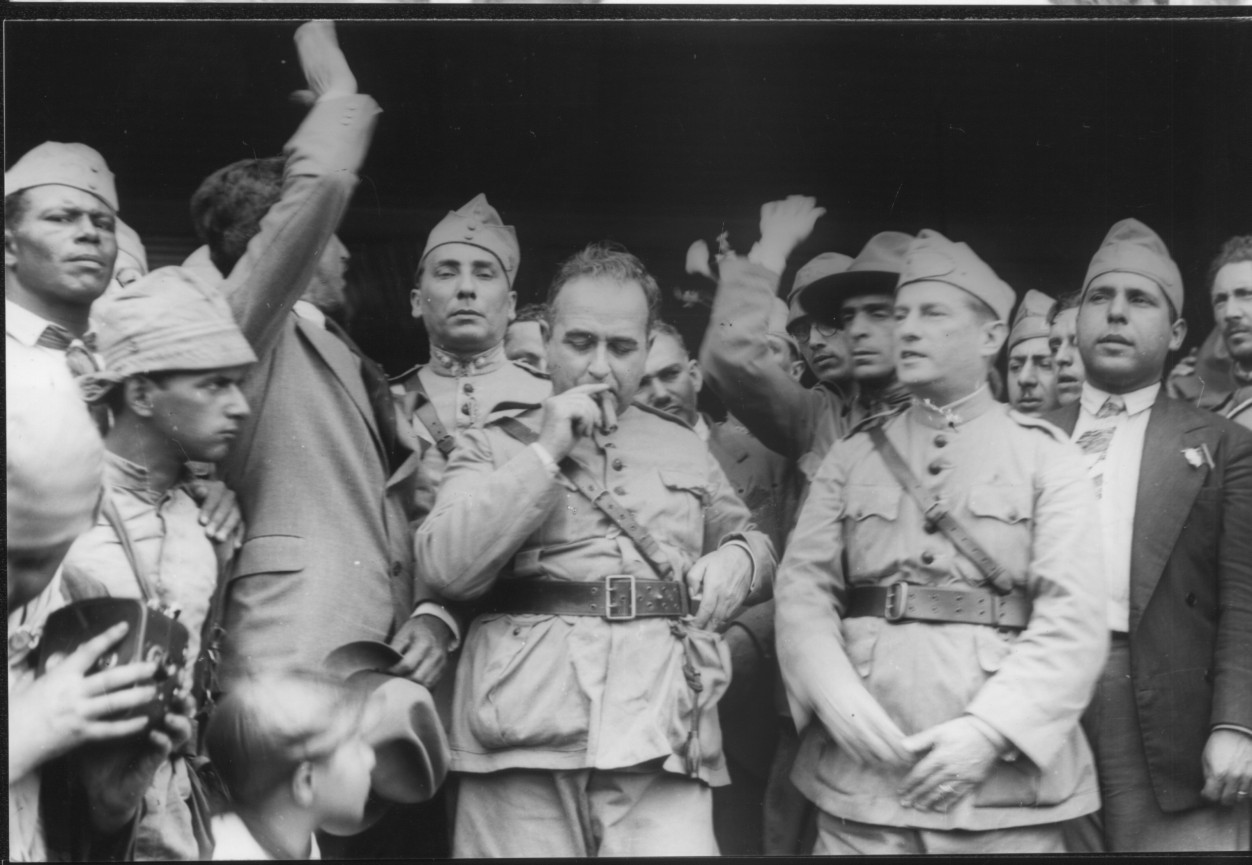
Getúlio Vargas in a moment of relaxation.

On October 5, in the state of Paraná, General Plinio Tourinho advised Vargas that it would be safe for him to establish his headquarters in what was now the frontlines of the revolution. In the Southeast of the country, the new state President of Minas Gerais, Olegario Maciel, delivered a revolutionary proclamation to all of the state's local administrators, with the state police arresting and rounding up federal officers. The well-supplied 12th infantry regiment, however, defended itself in the state capital until October 8.

=== Northeastern Brazil ===
In the Northeast of the country, the revolution was slow to gain movement, mainly because of a quarrel between Aranha and Captain Juarez Távora. Távora insisted the revolution should begin at dawn on October 4, instead of October 3, when it began in the south. What resulted was federal officers in the northeast being warned about the revolution before the revolutionaries had been prepared to fight. In the state of Pernambuco, the pro-federal state President and former Vice-President of the country, Estácio Coimbra, and revolutionaries quickly formed hostilities. With the strategic leadership of Carlos Lima Cavalcanti, civilians began wrecking the telephone station. A former Pernambuco police officer attacked a munitions dump at Soledade, Paraíba, a state of the Liberal Alliance that had joined the cause, alongside 16 men, and weapons were handed out to the public.

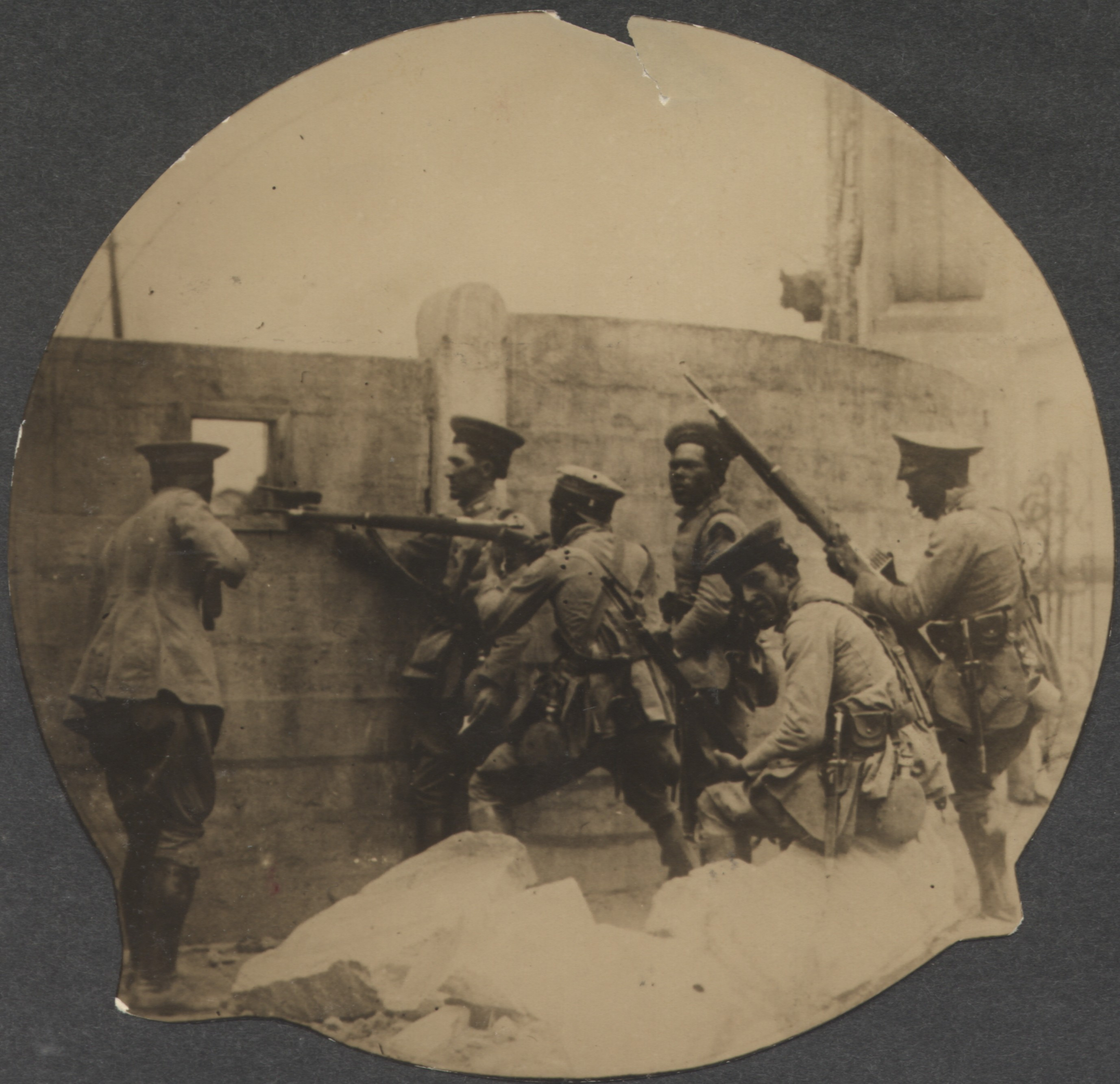
Soldiers in combat during the revolution.

Távora and his men entered and captured the state capital, Recife, which was already being controlled by Cavalcanti. The capture of Recife resulted in 38 deaths and 120 wounded, and Távora continued throughout the Northeast, where state governments continued to collapse to the revolutionaries.

The state of Bahia was now being invaded by Juraci Magalhães, where a counterrevolution attempt occurred. The former president of Maranhão and Senator Magalhães de Almeida volunteered to recover his state from revolutionaries and to restore it to Luís. Luís allowed Almeida to recover his state if he also supported the pro–federal loyalists in the state of Pará. Magalhães, now aboard a ship dually-armed with cannon, planned to bombard the capital of Maranhão from the sea but halted his expedition as the governing junta in the state planned to execute pro-federal prisoners if the senator were to take any action. The counterrevolution ended, and Magalhães was arrested.

=== Military coup ===
==== Planning ====
On 19 October, the popular Cardinal Sebastião Leme, the archbishop of Rio de Janeiro, arrived in the capital from Rome. Two days earlier, he had been convinced by Cavalcanti that in the interest of peace, he should procure Luís's resignation. When Leme tried to discuss this with Luís, the President replied, "What! Then Your Eminence doubts the loyalty of my generals!"

Many generals believed that the President's continued stubbornness was useless, and they feared a civil war. One such general was Augusto Tasso Fragoso, the former Army Chief of Staff, who earlier told the former Rio Grande do Sul deputy Lindolfo Collor that he might join the revolution if it turned nationwide. After attending Mass for a general who had been killed in Paraíba, Tasso Fragoso told General João de Deus Mena Barreto that a rebellion in Rio seemed imminent. Mena Barreto was being urged by his chief of staff, Colonel Bertoldo Klinger, on behalf of a group of young officers, to intervene to end the hostilities in a military coup favorable to revolutionaries. Concerned about the military hierarchy, Mena Barreto suggested Tasso Fragoso, the most senior officer, head the movement. On the morning of 23 October, however, one of Mena Barreto's sons convinced Tasso Fragoso to head the movement.

Mena Barreto told Klinger to write an ultimatum to the president. Many were reluctant to sign it, but Klinger received approval from key members of the Army's general staff. What was being proposed was a "pacification coup." Tasso Fragoso reworded Klinger's document to make it seem like more of an appeal to the president. Tasso Fragoso, Mena Barreto, and their associates convened on the night of 23 October at Fort Copacabana to make plans for the ousting and received favorable news from the Military Police and the outlying barracks at Vila Militar.

==== Execution ====
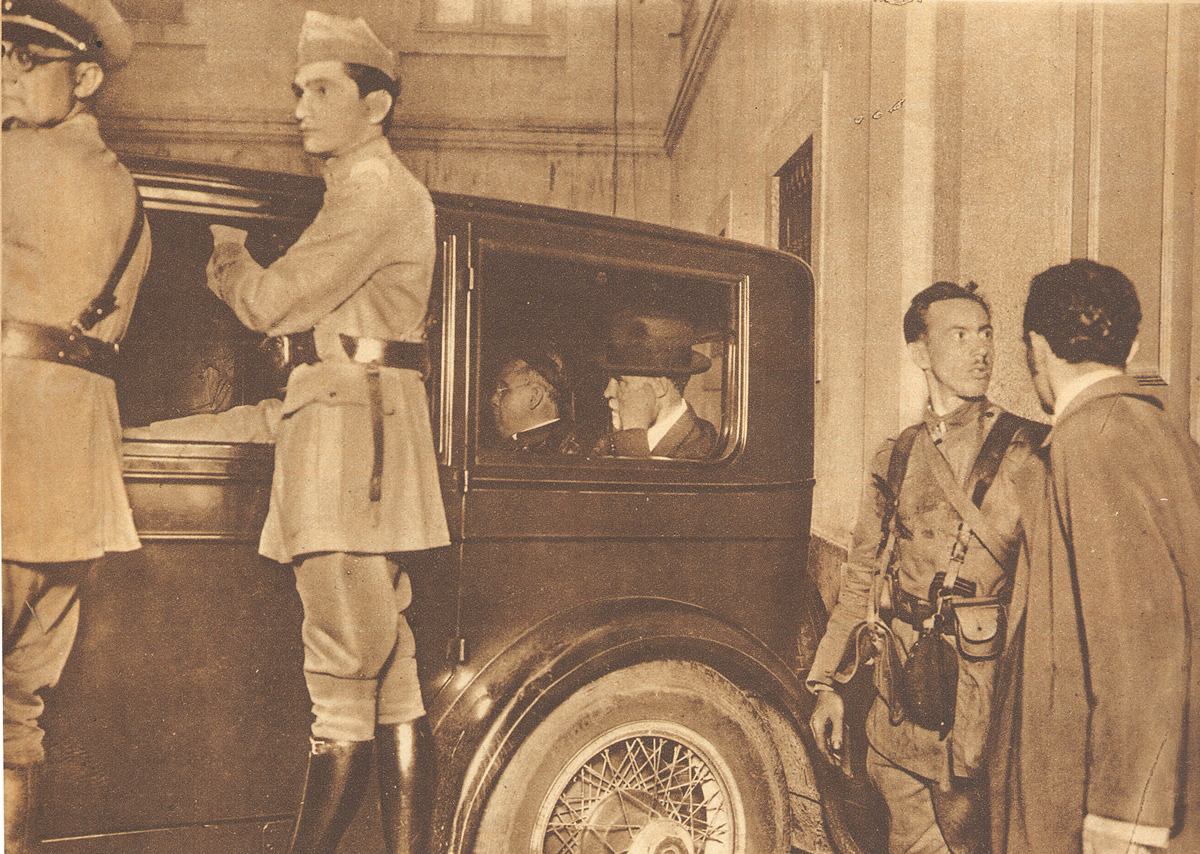
The deposed President Washington Luís leaving the Guanabara Palace, the official residence (October 24). Seated beside him is Cardinal Leme.

The operation to depose the president was initiated on the morning of 24 October. Before dawn, the Minister of War and commander of the 1st Military Region came to talk with Luís, and it became clear the situation was unsustainable and irreversible. Shortly before 9 a.m., Leme called to speak with Minister of Foreign Affairs Otávio Mangabeira that he had been told Fort Copacabana ordered the President to leave by 11 a.m., and, as a warning, they would begin shooting dry powder after 9 a.m. Luís determined that his wife and other ladies in the Guanabara Palace, Luís's residence, would evacuate and seek shelter in their friends' house in Cosme Velho. Shots of dry powder began as they left, which scared the entire population of Rio.

Klinger's appeal, signed by the generals, appeared early in the press. Consequently, mobs were soon enthusiastically setting fire to pro-government newspapers. Meanwhile, rebel troops were moved from the regiment at Praia Vermelha to the Guanabara Palace. The movement was hindered only by crowds of armed civilians hoping to join the march. The president gathered those present and allowed them to leave, but none did so, and all stuck by his side. Though the president was told that he could count on 2,600 soldiers, the police brigade defending the Guanabara Palace chose not to resist. Tasso Fragoso and Mena Barreto, as well as Alfredo Malan d'Angrogne, entered. They found the president, who got up to speak with them, sitting solemnly in a small gloomy room and surrounded by his cabinet, sons, a few friends, and congressmen. In the distance were taunting cries from the crowd outside.

According to the historian John W. F. Dulles, "The President remained every inch the proud man who would fulfill his duty as he saw it." "Only in pieces I leave here," the president said to his ministers. He said that there were still soldiers to defend his government. He was completely mistaken, and Tasso Fragoso later explained, "No one wanted his son to put on a uniform and die fighting a man frankly divorced from the common interest." After bowing, Tasso Fragoso offered Luís his life to which the president proclaimed, in a firm and dry tone, "The last thing I cherish at a time like this is my life. My blood will soak the soil so that a better Brazil may emerge, a true national regeneration." After Luís refused to resign, and tensions climaxed, the general replied, "Your Excellency will be responsible for the consequences," and Luís accepted. Bowing again, Tasso Fragoso left.

That afternoon, Cardinal Leme, calling on the president at Tasso Fragoso's request, told him that the generals had established their provisional government on the first floor of the Guanabara Palace. He used his influence with Luís to ease him out of office in safety. Noting the ugly mood of the crowd, Leme said that Fort Copacabana would be the safest place for the president, and got the generals to agree that he would be allowed to set sail for Europe without delay. Those who were by his side concurred, and at 5 p.m., he agreed and was driven to Fort Copacabana. In the presidential limousine with Luís were Leme, Tasso Fragoso, and several others. The president explained to Leme, "Since this morning, I have been a prisoner in this room, with the palace and gardens invaded by troops. I leave, bowing to violence."

=== Pacifying junta ===
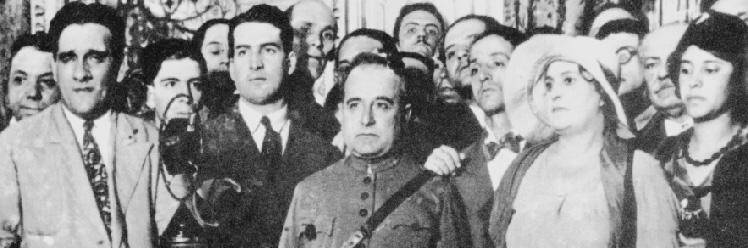
Vargas (center; in uniform), next to his wife Darci Vargas (second right), in the Catete Palace, after his arrival in Rio de Janeiro, 31 October 1930.

In the aftermath of the coup, the president had been replaced by a three-man provisional governing "pacifying junta" composed of Tasso Fragoso, Mena Barreto, and Admiral Isaías de Noronha. Appointing officials and informing the fighting fronts of what was happening in Rio, they did not imply that they would transfer power to those who had initiated the revolution on 3 October. Their intentions became more unclear after Klinger, the new police chief of Rio de Janeiro, promised to subdue any popular manifestations in the capital promoting the revolution. Though antirevolutionary forces laid down their arms, and the battle at Itararé never happened (jokingly referred to as what would be the "biggest battle in Latin American history"), Távora claimed that he did not recognize the junta and so he continued marching his troops toward Salvador, the capital of Bahia. Mobs caused chaos in Rio while the transfer of government to Vargas was being worked out.

Eventually, an agreement was made by Oswaldo Aranha and Collor, Vargas's emissaries, and Tasso Fragoso on 28 October. The former had sent a message to the junta a few days earlier that stated that the revolutionaries "cannot stop in the middle of the road." After Vargas arrived in Rio on 31 October, according to Bourne, "The acclaim was tumultuous. Persons alive today subsequently disillusioned with Vargas as president, can remember the heady feeling that a new era was dawning." The junta gave up power to Vargas on 3 November, a month after the revolution had broken out, which started a fifteen-year-long presidency. About a week later, on 11 November, he issued a decree granting himself dictatorial powers. A few ministers appointed from the junta were retained such as the junta member Noronha, who became navy minister.

== Aftermath ==
=== Revolts ===
After Vargas had assumed control as interim president, three revolts broke out in Brazil throughout his reign. The first was the 1932 Constitutionalist Revolution, led by São Paulo. The revolution led to a new constitution on July 16, 1934, which resulted in Vargas being elected by delegates in the 1934 Brazilian presidential election.

A communist revolution broke out in 1935, but it, like the 1932 revolution, was effectively suppressed. However, a fascist revolution in 1938 led to a political crisis. Vargas, in the name of law and order, repealed the constitution, abolished political parties, canceled the 1938 presidential elections, and pronounced a new Constitution: the 1937 Estado Novo Constitution. Vargas's powers were expanded exponentially: he abolished the legislative assembly and replaced most state governors with men whom he approved, which led to a lack of any check on his powers and started the Third Brazilian Republic, better known as the Estado Novo, in which Vargas essentially became a dictator with unlimited powers from 1937 to 1945.

== See also ==
- Revolutions of Brazil
- History of Brazil
