= Brazilian Revolution of 1930 in the Northeast =

Revolution of 1930 in Northeastern Brazil
- Part of the Revolution of 1930
- Troops from Paraíba passing through Maceió during the revolutionary offensive toward Bahia
Date	4–24 October 1930
Location	Northeastern Brazil, with the heaviest fighting in Paraíba, Bahia, and Pernambuco
Result	Revolutionary victory

Belligerents
Revolutionaries; Paraíba; Minas Gerais; Army sectors; Civilian volunteers	Loyalists; Brazil; Army; Navy; Pernambuco; Alagoas; Sergipe; Bahia; Maranhão; Piauí; Ceará; Rio Grande do Norte; Civilian volunteers

Commanders and leaders
Juarez Távora; José Américo de Almeida	Augusto Lavenère †; Antenor de Santa Cruz

In Brazil's Northeast region, (Note: There was no official regional division of Brazil until 1942. Informally, what existed in 1930 was a "North" encompassing all of the current North and Northeast regions, plus Espírito Santo, totaling twelve states and one federal territory. The definition of the Northeast as the area spanning from Bahia to Maranhão is used here for educational purposes.) the Revolution of 1930 ousted state governments loyal to President Washington Luís and installed intervenors loyal to the provisional administration of José Américo de Almeida, under the national leadership of Getúlio Vargas. Starting on 4 October, military and civilian conspirators—backed by the government of Paraíba—seized control of local Army garrisons and advanced against Bahia, the last loyalist state. The government of Minas Gerais opened a second front in southern Bahia. A military coup in Rio de Janeiro on the 24th halted hostilities and secured a national victory for the revolution.

In the 1930 presidential election, Paraíba was the only Northeastern state to support the opposition Liberal Alliance ticket. The federal government responded by condoning the Princesa Revolt and sending Army reinforcements to the state following the assassination of Paraíba Governor João Pessoa in Recife that July. The option available to the Alliance politicians was to partner with the Tenentist military conspirators, coordinated by Juarez Távora, who had been waiting in hiding within Paraíba since April. The plan called for simultaneous armed uprisings in the Northeast, Minas Gerais, and the South to overthrow the federal government. Due to a communication error, the movement in the Northeast began hours later than in the rest of the country, where the start date was 3 October.

Loyalist governors found themselves with ineffective state police forces (Public Forces) and hostile populations. Most relinquished power with little to no resistance. Heavier fighting, involving significant popular participation, took place in Recife. In Paraíba, after seizing the headquarters of the 7th Military Region, the revolutionaries organized columns composed of Army troops, state police, and civilian volunteers. The federal government appointed General Santa Cruz Pereira de Abreu to organize the legalist defense in Bahia, with the assistance of the Public Force and local political bosses from the countryside. By the end of the revolution, the northern revolutionary column—led by Landri Sales—was preparing for operations in Pará; the interior column, led by Jurandir Mamede, was in Juazeiro; and the eastern column, led by Agildo Barata and Juracy Magalhães, was entering Bahia. The Minas Gerais Public Force and allied political bosses were opening another front from Carinhanha.

The legalist plan to defend the São Francisco River line was thwarted when the garrisons in Alagoas and Sergipe defected to the revolutionary side. The final battle was thus set to take place at the Alagoinhas railway junction. The offensive was already underway when news arrived of the coup in Rio de Janeiro and the fall of the federal government. In the immediate aftermath of the revolution, Juarez Távora became the "Viceroy of the North," selecting military officers aligned with the revolution to serve as federal intervenors in most of the region's state governments. The cangaço was suppressed, and the political bosses were disarmed. Politicians from the "North" formed a distinct political bloc that remained loyal to Vargas until the 1934 Constituent Assembly.

== Background ==
The First Brazilian Republic was a federation of regional oligarchies. Each state's political weight was proportional to the cohesion of its elites, the size of its congressional delegation, and its economic self-sufficiency. The most powerful states were São Paulo, Minas Gerais, and Rio Grande do Sul, all located in the country's Center-South. A second tier comprised Rio de Janeiro, Bahia, and Pernambuco. None of the other states possessed a strong congressional delegation or economy. Two of the mid-tier states—Bahia and Pernambuco—were located in what is now the Northeast region. The latter aspired to regional leadership, although this ambition was already greatly diminished by 1930.

During this period, the Northeast was in decline relative to the Center-South due to various factors: geographic isolation, technological backwardness, high illiteracy rates, and a lack of unity among its states in pursuit of common interests. Population growth in the Center-South reduced the proportion of Northeastern representatives in Congress. Sugar plantation owners remained powerful on their own lands but were losing relative importance and facing tougher competition in the sugar market. The state militias—which First Republic states militarized to defend against federal intervention—were not a significant force in the Northeast. Violence was commonplace in the political process and in the countryside, where bandits and the private armies of local political bosses operated. These bosses projected their private power across informal domains within the sertão.

=== 1930 presidential election ===
Getúlio Vargas and João Pessoa (wearing the darker suit) at a Liberal Alliance rally

For the 1930 presidential election, the federal government—led by Washington Luís, a native of São Paulo—launched the candidacy of a fellow São Paulo native, Júlio Prestes. Rio Grande do Sul and Minas Gerais formed the Liberal Alliance to launch the opposition candidacy of Getúlio Vargas, then State President (governor) of Rio Grande do Sul. Paraíba was asked if it would support the incumbent-backed ticket of Júlio Prestes, and on 29 July 1929, the Republican Party of Paraíba decided to withhold its support. This moment went down in history as the "Nego" (meaning "I refuse" or "I deny"), even though the word itself did not appear in any document from that day. Paraíba's governor, João Pessoa, accepted an invitation from José Bonifácio de Andrada (of Minas Gerais) and João Neves da Fontoura (of Rio Grande do Sul) to join the Liberal Alliance ticket as the vice-presidential candidate. The same proposal had previously been extended to the governor of Pernambuco, Estácio Coimbra, but he was unwilling to risk joining the opposition and had received promises of economic benefits from São Paulo.

The governor of Bahia, Vital Soares, agreed to join Júlio Prestes' ticket as the vice-presidential candidate. Seventeen states aligned themselves with the incumbent-backed candidacy, while only Minas Gerais, Rio Grande do Sul, and Paraíba sided with the Liberal Alliance. The Liberal Alliance's caravan through the Northeast, led by João Pessoa, arrived in Salvador on 24 January 1930. The campaign continued to Recife and Paraíba (the former name of the state capital of Paraíba), where crowds waved small red-and-black flags bearing the inscription "Nego". The caravan returned to Recife and split into groups to tour all the Northeastern states, as well as Pará and Amazonas. The election took place on 1 March. As was customary, electoral fraud and the control of the electorate by local political bosses ensured the victory of the incumbent faction. The final vote count, published in late April, declared Júlio Prestes and Vital Soares the winners.

=== Political-military alliance ===
The opposition had an alternative: since mid-1929, the Liberal Alliance had been in contact with the Tenentist military officers who had launched several armed uprisings against the government in previous years. Their common cause was to oust Washington Luís and prevent Júlio Prestes from taking office. The alliance was not inevitable. In the middle of the previous decade, João Pessoa had served as a justice on the Superior Military Court, voting to convict tenentist rebels such as Captain Juarez Távora—who would go on to lead the revolution in the Northeast. Juarez had been the deputy chief of staff of the Prestes Column, an armed campaign that traversed the entire country. The Column did not win, but it brought national fame to leaders like Juarez and Luís Carlos Prestes. At the start of Washington Luís administration in 1927, these military officers had laid down their arms and waited in exile.

There were shared interests. The political system, dominated by São Paulo interests, obstructed the political and career advancement of the conspirators—both civilian and military—and denied their regions attention from the national state. Juarez and José Américo de Almeida, a civilian leader from Paraíba, were both descendants of large landowners active in local politics. Their regions were peripheral (Paraíba and Ceará), and neither was an heir to the family estate: José Américo built a career in the judiciary, while Juarez pursued a career as a military officer.

In May, Juarez wrote to Lieutenant Joaquim Ribeiro Monteiro in Bahia: "I deem it pointless to recount to my esteemed comrade the litany of outrages with which the current government—the legitimate fruit of a rotten political mentality—has mocked our pseudo-constitutional regime, brutally demonstrating to all men of good will that it is nothing more than ineffectual idealism to expect the virtues of the ballot, or other legal avenues, to work the miracle that only a violent revolution can achieve." Among the military conspirators, there were already rifts that would become more pronounced after the revolution: some favored a dictatorship to clean up political abuses. There was a fear that politicians from the Liberal Alliance would subvert the principles of the intended revolution.

=== Bahia ===
Campaign material for the Júlio Prestes-Vital Soares ticket: "Voting for Júlio Prestes and Vital Soares means contributing to Brazil's greatness"

Bahia was firmly aligned with the regime: in addition to Vital Soares’s candidacy for vice president, another local politician, Otávio Mangabeira, served as Minister of Justice. In Salvador, a peaceful succession agreement was reached in June 1930. The governor resigned and handed over the government to the president of the state senate, Frederico Costa. However, the Bahia oligarchy was divided, and certain sectors were open to the idea of a regime change. Prominent figures such as J. J. Seabra and Muniz Sodré were in the opposition. The Great Depression, tax hikes, and press coverage sowed discontent among some of the local political bosses in the countryside. These figures were the political pillars of the parties, as they mobilized large numbers of voters and accounted for a significant share of the trade balance through their cocoa, tobacco, and sugar plantations. The two most prestigious bosses, who dominated vast regions of the interior, were Horácio de Matos, from the Lavras Diamantinas area, and Franklin Lins de Albuquerque, from Pilão Arcado. Their reputations as warlords had been established during the Sertaneja Revolt of 1919—a confrontation with the state government—and during the passage of the Prestes Column through Bahia in 1926. In the latter instance, Horácio and Franklin’s battalions fought in defense of the government. Following that conflict, large stockpiles of weaponry were left in the hands of local forces.

Antônio Carlos Ribeiro de Andrada, the governor of Minas Gerais, organized strategic meetings between leaders of the Republican Party of Minas Gerais (PRM) and bosses from the Bahia section of the São Francisco Valley—most notably João Duque, a key recruiter of supporters. (Note: Among them were Durval Marinho Paes, from Angical; Deraldo Mendes, from Conquista; Mário Teixeira, from Caetité; Colonel "Rabelo," from Lapa; and Franklin Lins.) In late 1929, a dispute between João Duque and João Alkimin over the mayoralty of Carinhanha, located on the border between the two states, pitted the two state governments against each other and drew press attention. Both bosses held alliances within Minas Gerais politics and were significant figures regarding the complex succession of the PRM leadership. Duque resorted to violence to secure a new term, backed by Franklin Lins and Chico Leobás from Pilão Arcado. Other warlords dispatched their private militias to defend Alkimin. The governors of Minas Gerais and Bahia exchanged stern correspondence. When the Federal Prosecutor's Office in Bahia indicted Duque and his allies for the so-called "Carinhanha crime," the Minas Gerais Public Force extracted him from Bahia'a territory. The Bahia Public Force subsequently punished the bosses of the Middle São Francisco region, who then endorsed the Liberal Alliance the following year.

=== Paraíba ===
The threat of federal intervention loomed over João Pessoa (Careta magazine)

João Pessoa, the governor of Paraíba, was the nephew of former President Epitácio Pessoa, a dominant figure in the Paraíba Republican Party. As was the case in the other two states aligned with the Alliance (Minas Gerais and Rio Grande do Sul), the ruling establishment in Paraíba was incorporating a younger generation of leaders—a group João Pessoa himself represented. His rhetoric and political practices were, to a certain extent, critical of the very oligarchic system from which he had emerged. João Pessoa pledged to combat the abuses of coronelism, banditry, fiscal irresponsibility, and illegal criminal proceedings. His support base extended to the urban middle class and small farmers. Rural political bosses, on the other hand, resented his tax policy, which burdened overland trade routes with Pernambuco.

In addition to the presidency, the election covered seats in the Chamber of Deputies and one-third of the Senate. João Pessoa forced an almost complete overhaul of the Paraíba Republican Party's slate of candidates, prompting several influential political bosses to leave the party. In the Paraíba municipality of Princesa, Colonel José Pereira—one of the most powerful political bosses in the Northeast—announced his switch to the Conservative Republican Party (which supported Júlio Prestes) and began arming jagunços and cangaceiros. In the election, the Alliance candidates secured two-thirds of the vote, yet every candidate on the official slate was disqualified by the Chamber of Deputies' Credentials Committee. Consequently, the state's delegation to Congress came to consist of supporters of José Pereira and the federal government. The treatment meted out to the Alliance states was hostile. Only Rio Grande do Sul was spared, due to prior agreements regarding coexistence.

After the election, the Public Force was dispatched to Princesa, sparking an armed conflict known as the Princesa Revolt. The Paraíba government was unable to quell the uprising, and police began raiding the homes and offices of individuals suspected of stockpiling weapons and ammunition intended for smuggling into Princesa. On 22 July, one such raid targeted the residence of João Dantas, a member of the Suassuna family and an ally of José Pereira. The newspaper A União, Paraíba's official government organ, published private correspondence between João Dantas and a local woman. Three days later, while the governor was visiting Recife, João Dantas shot and killed him.

The murder sent shockwaves across the country. In Paraíba, mobs ransacked the homes of the slain politician's adversaries. Commercial properties were set ablaze in Santa Rita, Guarabira, and Campina Grande, and Indigenous groups destroyed the Dantas family's coconut farm in Mamanguape. Speakers and newspapers launched virulent attacks against high-ranking officials of the Republic. The Legislative Assembly of Paraíba renamed the capital João Pessoa and adopted a new state flag featuring the word "Nego". On 27 July, prisoners broke out of the local jail. Families sought refuge in military bases and federal government offices. With the Public Force occupied by the conflict in the countryside, the state government agreed to have the Army's 22nd Light Infantry Battalion (BC) patrol the city. One soldier died during the unrest.

General Augusto Lavenère Wanderley, commander of the Army's 7th Military Region (7th RM), relocated his command headquarters to the 22nd BC barracks in the state capital. The state government was ordered to withdraw its troops from the vicinity of the city. The rebels from Princesa laid down their arms, and Army troops were stationed in the conflict zone, as well as in the capital and several other municipalities. Under the pretext of preventing cangaceiros from invading neighboring states, Paraíba was effectively subjected to a "soft intervention". Following the death of João Pessoa, the Paraíba government was taken over by Vice-Governor Álvaro Carvalho, whose good relationship with federal military authorities did not sit well with the revolutionaries. The burial took place in Rio de Janeiro, where the deceased's family resided, in order to maximize the impact. The conspirators found a pretext to reignite the movement, yet the setting of a date was delayed until October.

== Conspiracy and planning ==
The revolutionary conspiracy in the Northeast centered on Paraíba under the military leadership of Captain Juarez Távora. The revolutionary leadership tasked him with coordinating operations from Bahia to Pará. His authority was equivalent to that of Góis Monteiro in the South. Civil leadership was offered to João Pessoa, but he declined. Initially without his knowledge—and later with his consent—his government secretaries maintained contact with the military officer. It fell to one of them, José Américo de Almeida, to assume the civil leadership.

=== Juarez Távora's trip ===
Juarez Távora (top) after the victory of the revolution

The basis of Juarez Távora’s legitimacy was a letter from Tenentist leader Isidoro Dias Lopes commissioning him as a brigadier general to lead the movement in the Northeast. The document dated back to July 1927, when the two had conferred in Montevideo, Uruguay. Juarez had presented a plan for an uprising in the Northeast centered on the Recife garrison, but they had concluded it was unfeasible at that time. Carlos de Lima Cavalcanti—a journalist, sugar mill owner, and former congressman from Pernambuco—was a proponent of the plan; a few months later, he would shelter Tenentist João Alberto Lins de Barros on his estate. In the second half of 1927, acting under orders from Luís Carlos Prestes, Juarez Távora and Siqueira Campos began recruiting young officers to a new movement. Realizing that support was lacking and the political climate was too calm, they extended the preparatory phase until better conditions arose—specifically, during the presidential succession following Washington Luís's term.

Juarez’s name evoked a legend of bravery. To young men fresh out of the Military School of Realengo, he was an icon. José Américo recalled his qualities as a conspirator: "Once he started speaking, few could resist his persuasive charm." According to Lieutenant Agildo Barata, he was an "expert" in troop uprisings, capable of systematizing—"at the cost of many setbacks and the rare successes of Tenentist revolts"—a considerable body of experience regarding coups and barracks mutinies. This experience dictated that a movement should only be launched with a certainty of success. It was "always better to delay than to act rashly," and he was convinced of "the futility of weak or isolated movements." The "revolutionaries were no longer willing to lend their support to governments associated with failed coup attempts."

In 1929, Juarez left his exile in Argentina for Rio Grande do Sul, where he received a forged passport from Oswaldo Aranha, the Secretary of the Interior. Juarez agreed with Vargas and his fellow military officers—Prestes, Siqueira, and João Alberto—to organize the movement in the Northeast. In January, he was captured by the police in Rio de Janeiro. The authorities were hot on the conspirators' trail. Yet, not closely enough: from within his prison cell at the Santa Cruz Fortress, he maintained contact with officers from the 1st Infantry Regiment. Lieutenant Juracy Magalhães visited him to propose establishing a conspiratorial cell in the Northeast. He and his colleagues—Lieutenants Jurandir Bizarria Mamede and Agildo Barata, all of whom were Northeasterners—were to be transferred to the 22nd BC in the capital of Paraíba. The regiment's second-in-command, Colonel Maurício Cardoso, had been appointed commander of that battalion and had selected the three lieutenants for their excellence in troop training. The colonel was a legalist and was unaware that he was selecting the men who would come to be known as "Juarez's lieutenants."

The three lieutenants traveled in February, taking advantage of stopovers in Espírito Santo and Bahia to recruit more allies. Prestes ordered Juarez to flee to Paraíba and take charge of the conspiracy in the Northeast. He managed to escape and entered Bahia via the São Francisco River. In April, he arrived in Recife, then traveled to Paraíba, Fortaleza, and back to Paraíba, where he was sheltered at the home of Juracy and Mamede on Tambaú Beach. Their communications frequently relied on codes and encrypted messages.

He would go on to change hideouts several times, and the police pursued rumors of his presence even in Bahia. On 25 July, the Federal District police chief, Coriolano de Góes, asked Paraíba’s Secretary of Public Security, José Américo, to have ships docking there "searched with the utmost care to verify whether the revolutionary captain Juarez Távora was traveling on board." The Paraíba government issued a statement: "The argument that Paraíba was barred from receiving ammunition because the laboratory of the revolution was located here cannot withstand even the most superficial analysis. [...] That revolutionary elements were taking refuge in this state to foment the idea of rebellion [...] They even concocted the novel claim that we were harboring revolutionary officers."

=== Establishing contacts ===
Juarez Távora responds in the press to Luís Carlos Prestes's break with the conspiracy

In May, Juarez reported having "personally met with friendly figures from Pernambuco, Paraíba, Rio Grande do Norte, and Ceará" and having communicated in writing with allies in Piauí, Maranhão, Pará, Bahia, and Alagoas. The conspiracy was weaker in Bahia, Alagoas, and Sergipe. This record appears in the Instructions to Local Northern Leaderships, distributed in May. The Instructions still cited Luís Carlos Prestes as a leader. Juarez was unaware of news from the south. That same month, Prestes had informed Siqueira Campos, João Alberto, and Miguel Costa of his withdrawal from the conspiracy. He had embraced communism, scorned any revolution involving the oligarchies of the Liberal Alliance, and criticized his former comrades. To him, Juarez was "sanctimonious, backward, and a fake revolutionary."

In his reply, Juarez advocated for a government representing all classes and criticized Prestes's proposed solutions regarding foreign debt, foreign companies, and large landholdings. In June, the press published the correspondence between the two former comrades. Regarding the movement's direction, Juarez outlined two possible scenarios to his subordinates:

1) The Center and South remain cohesive, guaranteeing the same support upon which we have based our plans. In this scenario, a new military leader must be elected, whom we shall all obey.
2) The Center and South disintegrate and fall into disarray, unable to provide the promised support—but Paraíba decides to resist federal intervention, serving as the nucleus for an uprising across the entire North, under my sole command.

Each local group was to respond with two words: "Yes-Yes" if they could continue in the movement in either scenario; "Yes-No" if they would participate only with support from the Center and South; and "No-No" if they deemed any action unfeasible at that moment. There is a record only of the response from the Bahia group: "No-No." Officers in the Salvador garrison rejected Prestes but did not trust the politicians of the Liberal Alliance. It is known that Prestes's withdrawal had a disheartening effect in the Center and South. Even so, the conspiracy was not abandoned, and simply required new opportunities. Following the death of João Pessoa in July, efforts intensified. Juarez could count on the support of junior officers in federal garrisons, particularly in Bahia, Pernambuco, Paraíba, and Ceará. In September, Oswaldo Aranha informed Vargas that the "Northern" garrisons would support the revolution, though the conspiracy had failed to gain traction in Amazonas, Sergipe, and Alagoas.

=== Cells in Paraíba ===
José Américo de Almeida (seated in the center) and his fellow revolutionaries

As in Minas Gerais and Rio Grande do Sul, the conspiracy in Paraíba enjoyed the protection of political authority. It was more dangerous to be an enemy of the revolution. Government secretaries were leaders within the conspiracy: José Américo de Almeida, Antenor Navarro, and Ademar Vidal. The commander of the Public Force, Lieutenant Colonel Elísio Sobreira, received instructions from Juarez. Only Governor Álvaro de Carvalho was unaware of the plot. In his own words, "wireless telegraphy, codes, and other means of secret communication with the Alliance states and with forces in the countryside were in the hands of Mr. José Américo de Almeida—in his capacity as Secretary of Public Security—and of Messrs. Ademar Vidal, Antenor Navarro, and Ávila Lins. These friends held the state secrets, serving as public and private secretaries to President João Pessoa." Previously, João Pessoa had also been reticent. At the launch of the Liberal Alliance campaign in Rio de Janeiro on 30 December 1929, he declared: "I would a thousand times prefer Júlio Prestes to a revolution." Yet the governor's complicity was not required: José Américo coordinated directly with military officers and politicians, and controlled both the municipalities and the Public Force.

The concentration of federal troops in the state did not intimidate the conspirators. Recruitment possibilities were plentiful: officers from the 7th Military Region Headquarters spent the night at the 22nd BC barracks, and detachments from various light infantry battalions were stationed in towns across Paraíba: the 24th (from São Luís) and 25th (from Teresina) in Cabedelo; the 28th (from Aracaju) (Note: Alcyr Lintz Geraldo mentions the presence of a company from the 28th BC in João Pessoa prior to the Revolution, but does not mention its fate when describing the events involving the other battalions in Paraíba in October, ultimately concluding that "six battalions revolted in Paraíba." Excluding those stationed in Princesa that joined the revolt after deploying to Pernambuco, the six battalions in question would be the 21st, 22nd, 23rd, 24th, 25th, and 29th.) in the state capital; the 23rd (from Fortaleza) in Sousa; the 21st (from Recife) in Campina Grande; and the 29th (from Natal) in Santa Luzia do Sabugi. The Navy dispatch vessel Muniz Freire docked at the Port of Sanhauá. In Princesa, the federal detachment consisted of companies from the 19th BC (Salvador) and 20th BC (Maceió), along with a machine-gun section from the 21st BC (Recife).

The officers of the 22nd BC were almost entirely loyalist, with a few crucial exceptions: Lieutenants Juracy Magalhães, Jurandir Mamede, Agildo Barata, and Paulo Cordeiro de Melo, who had been assigned to the unit in February 1930. All actions were reported to Juarez, who personally handled communications with the higher-ranking officers. Lieutenants Aloísio de Andrade Moura and Luiz Gonzaga de Oliveira Moura operated within the detachments from other battalions in Campina Grande; Captain Abelardo de Castro in Santa Rita do Sabugi; Captain Lemos Cunha and Lieutenants Dutra and Anacleto Tavares in Cabedelo; and Lieutenants Carlos Cordeiro de Almeida, Landri Sales, Francisco Távora, Júlio Veras, and Ari Correia in Sousa.

=== Cells in Bahia ===
The initial discussions regarding the armed movement in Bahia took place in February 1930, when Juracy, Mamede, and Barata passed through Salvador while being transferred from Rio to Paraíba. Lieutenants Humberto de Souza Melo and Joaquim Ribeiro Monteiro were personally invited to join the revolution by the "Juarez lieutenants." After months of effort, they managed to recruit only ten officers and sergeants. At the 19th BC in Salvador, the revolutionary officer corps included Lieutenants Ribeiro and Hanequim Dantas, as well as Aspirants João Costa and Humberto de Souza Melo. Aligning with them were several prominent local figures: physician Átila Amaral, engineers Alípio Viana and Leopoldo Amaral, and lawyer José Presídio.

In addition to the young officers of the 6th Military Region linked to Juarez Távora, there were two other distinct groups: civilians guided by conspirators from Rio de Janeiro—including Antônio Maciel Bonfim—and Liberal Alliance colonels from the São Francisco Valley linked to Minas Gerais, such as Franklin Lins de Albuquerque and João Duque. In March, Franklin requested weapons and at least thirty thousand rounds of ammunition from the government of Minas Gerais. In June, he was appointed head of recruitment for the Médio Valley by the PRM. The Minas faction designated Mário Brant, Odilon Braga, and Lieutenant Djalma Dutra to organize the conspiracy. Public Force Colonel Herculano Leite served as the liaison officer between the PRM and Franklin. Franklin was to operate in the north, while Duque operated in the south.

The military group was led by Lieutenant Monteiro. The conspirators relied on support in Paraíba and Pernambuco: Eduardo Mamede, a medical student and brother of Jurandir Bizarria Mamede, served as the link to Juarez Távora. Other communications took place via letters and telegraph, intensifying between February and May 1930. Instructions from Paraíba were received at the Nossa Senhora da Graça Health Center, managed by surgeon Átila do Amaral. The lieutenants' connections with civilians were clandestine and few in number.

As the head of the 2nd Section of the 6th Military Region's General Staff, Lieutenant Monteiro was able to travel to the state's countryside, an opportunity he used to build connections. In this way, he recruited the recruitment chiefs and Tiros de Guerra (military training unit) instructors in Ilhéus and Belmonte—Lieutenants Alfeu França and José Anselmo. In Bahia, the conspirators faced increasing surveillance, both inside and outside the barracks. Lieutenant Monteiro himself was summoned by the police chief to testify regarding Juarez Távora's contacts in Bahia, but he denied having any knowledge of them. For a time, his superiors' high regard for Lieutenant Monteiro kept suspicions at bay. Following an interrogation by Colonel Ataliba Osório, Lieutenants Monteiro and Melo were transferred for the "convenience of the service." Monteiro was assigned to the southern part of the state to serve on the Tiros de Guerra Examining Commission. Colonel Osório had been sounded out by the Region's Chief of Staff, Colonel Renato da Veiga Abreu—who held some sympathy for the movement—but this only heightened suspicions. The garrison commander's openly legalist stance further dampened revolutionary sympathies.

=== Other nuclei ===
Civil leadership in Pernambuco was held by Carlos de Lima Cavalcanti, assisted by his brothers Caio and Rui. Their sugar mill, Usina Pedrosa, served as one of the primary hubs for the conspiracy in the Northeast. In February, Juracy Magalhães met with the Lima Cavalcanti brothers at the Marés estate. Juarez also met with the Lima Cavalcanti brothers during his visit to Pernambuco in April. The military conspirators included Captain Muniz de Faria—a retired officer from the Public Force—along with several other non-commissioned officers from that same force; Lieutenants Sebastião Mendes de Holanda and Aluísio de Andrade Moura, and Sergeants Kleber de Morais and José Pessoa, all from the 21st BC; and Sergeants Nelson Cavalcanti and Helly Cavalcanti Gomes Sobrinho, from the Tiros de Guerra.

In Alagoas, the only military connection was with Lieutenant Arnaldo Sotero de Menezes, though the entire 20th BC was sympathetic to the revolutionaries. In the 29th BC in Rio Grande do Norte, Lieutenant Everardo de Vasconcelos served as the link within the only subunit of the battalion that remained at its headquarters. In Ceará, Juarez established contact with officers from the Military College and the 23rd BC.

In Maranhão, the primary conspirator was José Maria dos Reis Perdigão, a journalist and veteran of the Prestes Column. Reis Perdigão was a wanted man, sought by the Rio de Janeiro police. While in Porto Alegre, he was tasked by former comrades Miguel Costa and João Alberto with leading the revolution in the states of Maranhão and Piauí. The Maranhão police failed to thwart the conspiracy. Within the 29th BC, Reis Perdigão established ties with Sergeant José Pires do Amorim and two other non-commissioned officers. The political faction led by the physician Tarquínio Lopes Filho supported the revolution. After receiving instructions on 6 May 1930, Reis Perdigão traveled to Teresina, where he made contact with Matias Olímpio, the pharmacist Leão Marinho, and appellate judge Vaz da Silva. The judge recruited sergeants and corporals from the 25th BC, who brought a single commissioned officer—Captain Joaquim Lemos Cunha—into the conspiracy.

=== Preparation ===
The Instructions to Local Northern Leaderships were a detailed document, divided into the following sections: "General Considerations," "General Instructions," "Instructions for Executing the Uprising," "Suggestions for Administrative Organization," and "Special Instructions for Local Leadership." According to Agildo Barata, "anyone reading this document today gets the impression that it is more of a description of what actually happened than a forecast of what might have occurred."

The plan envisioned a "movement erupting simultaneously in the South, the Center, and the North of the country," with the goal of "overthrowing the federal government by crushing its reactionary forces." The Center-South was to be the primary theater of operations, as the government's main assets were concentrated there, while the North was remote and hampered by difficult overland communications. Therefore, "the primary mission of the revolutionaries in the North will be to neutralize the influence of the central government throughout the zone extending from Bahia to the far North—preventing it, by any means possible, from withdrawing military resources from that region to reinforce its defenses in the theaters of operation in the Center and South." The uprising would involve revolutionary elements from the Army, the Public Forces, and the civilian population. In one of his telegrams, Juarez analyzed the situation as follows:

The bearer will describe the situation in Paraíba and the North. In addition to the 22nd BC, three companies have arrived here from São Luís, Teresina, and Recife. Another has just arrived from Natal, and two more are on their way from Sergipe and Bahia. Even if the troops' state of alert is lifted, we could still trigger uprisings in four or five locations in the North and arm around ten thousand men within two or three weeks. If the state of alert persists, it is only here that we might successfully attempt an Army uprising [...] The North will only carry out a general and simultaneous uprising in coordination with the South.

"House of Lieutenant Mirocem Navarro, in the Tambiá neighborhood, where Captain Juarez Távora took shelter for months and where the entire plan for the revolution in the North was devised."

The uprisings were to begin simultaneously at 02:00 on a prearranged date. Loyalist officers would be arrested in their homes; communication facilities and other key sites would be seized; and columns would be organized to take control of other cities and states. Civilian cooperation and the element of surprise were considered crucial. The outlook for the region comprising Alagoas, Sergipe, and Bahia was not favorable. "Should the initial cooperation of the revolutionary elements in Alagoas, Sergipe, and Bahia fail—as I fear it might—this zone will naturally become our primary theater of operations. All available regular forces from the revolutionary states in the North would then have to converge there in a rapid concentration." A prolonged resistance in Bahia would isolate the northeastern revolutionaries from their allies to the south. Juarez advocated for the proclamation of a general government for the North to direct the war effort. According to Agildo Barata, a plan had been in place since June for a maneuver targeting Alagoinhas, on the route to Salvador.

Paraíba was not in a position to assist Minas Gerais. The government of Minas Gerais had a plan concerning the sertão of Bahia and its allied political bosses. The bosses' strategy was for Franklin Lins to advance against Salvador, while Duque would eliminate any chief along the river who remained recalcitrant. Measures were taken to counter a potential loyalist offensive from Bahia via the São Francisco Valley. Beginning in September 1929, reinforcements were sent to the 3rd Battalion of the Minas Gerais Public Force, based in Diamantina, as well as to detachments in Pirapora, Januária, São Francisco, Manga, and Montes Claros. In June 1930, responsibility for the sector was assumed by Captain Quirino Alves de Barros, who was stationed in Januária with a contingent of eighty enlisted men. He had the support of local bosses (Note: Such as Idalino Ribeiro, from Salinas, and Levi de Souza, from Tremedal.) and of the director of the São Francisco River navigation service, Chagas Moura—a retired naval officer. The forces from Minas Gerais also had an interest in the port of Caravelas, on the southern coast of Bahia, as a point for importing arms and ammunition.

=== Scheduling the date ===
The date was repeatedly postponed, and the more radical elements wanted to launch the movement on their own, disregarding their allies. At the end of August, Juarez sent a telegram urging that the movement be hastened. In early September, the conspirators from Maranhão were summoned by "Olavo"—a pseudonym used by Juarez—to a meeting in Recife. While in Cabedelo, Paraíba, they learned that Juarez had already traveled to the state capital. Plans were finalized at the home of Antenor Navarro, and instructions were distributed to groups in Pernambuco, Ceará, and Pará. On 20 September, Oswaldo Aranha confirmed that preparations in the Center-South region were complete and requested that a date be selected.

On the 25th, the date was set for 3 October—chosen by Juarez from a list of three options provided by Oswaldo Aranha. 3 October was the day the 22nd BC in João Pessoa would have its 3rd Company on alert, with Juracy Magalhães serving as its interim commander. By order of the Military Region commander, the battalion's four companies were placed on a rotating alert schedule. On that same date, Agildo Barata was the officer on duty. Two days before the event, the leadership in each garrison was informed of the date. Believing the position of the conspirators in Recife to be precarious, Juarez headed to that city on the night of the 3rd, despite the objections of some of his associates who urged him to remain in Paraíba.

The start time was set for 17:30, following the end of the workday at the barracks. Juarez, apprehensive about the large number of loyalist officers he would have to face, consulted Oswaldo Aranha regarding a departure in the early hours of the 4th. The secret code used in the conspirators' telegrams did not include the word "movement," but rather "march." The representative from Rio Grande do Sul understood this to mean that the march of the forces from Paraíba toward Recife would begin in the early hours of the 4th—once Paraíba had been secured—and he responded affirmatively. Juarez informed the conspirators in his region that the operation would commence at 02:00 on the 4th. Due to this misunderstanding, the revolution began in the Northeast several hours later than it did in Minas Gerais and the southern part of the country.

== Outbreak in Paraíba ==
Gallery at the 22nd Infantry Battalion barracks where General Wanderley was confronted

Juracy Magalhães was to lead the initial operation in Paraíba, assisted by Agildo Barata, who was tasked with the arrest of loyalist officers—including Mamede and Paulo Cordeiro—as well as civilians led by Antenor Navarro. In his capacity as director of the Water Supply Service, Navarro identified a location where suction pumps were being installed to hold the detainees. Others were to be confined to their own homes or left abandoned in the wilderness. Soldiers were positioned at the residences of various officers and along the streets leading to the 22nd BC barracks in Cruz das Armas to carry out the arrests, while Agildo himself stood guard at the barracks entrance.

At midnight, between 3 and 4 October, a coded telegram from the Ministry of War arrived at the 22nd Battalion barracks, reporting the outbreak of a revolt in Rio Grande do Sul—with potential unrest also in Minas Gerais and Paraíba. The message was received by Agildo Barata, who was serving as the duty officer; he managed to conceal it inside his boot. However, a postal worker named Durval Tinoco alerted Lieutenant Sílvio da Silveira—an aide-de-camp to the regional commander—about the communication. By 01:00, the loyalists had brought a copy of the telegram to the barracks. General Wanderley and Colonel Cardoso were awake, waiting for Lieutenant Silveira to decrypt the message. Upon learning of this via telephone, Agildo informed Juracy, who moved the start of the attack up to 01:30 to ensure the element of surprise was not lost. José Américo recalled: "Upon arriving at the Police Headquarters, I was taking initial measures—ordering pickets to be set up at the exits and guards to be posted at key locations—when machine-gun fire erupted toward the Cruz das Armas area. I checked the time. It was not the scheduled hour."

From inside the barracks, Juracy gave the signal using a lantern lit in the courtyard. Agildo led an attack with eighteen civilians dressed in military uniforms. Lieutenant Silveira was physically overpowered while ascending the stairs with a decoded telegram. Colonel Cardoso refused an offer to take command of the revolution. Agildo threatened to throw a grenade into the room where the colonel and General Wanderley were located. By 03:00, the barracks had finally been seized, at the cost of five lives (four loyalist officers and one revolutionary corporal), with three soldiers and several civilians wounded. Among the dead was General Wanderley, who had been shot in the abdomen under controversial circumstances. (Note: Ordered to leave the room with his hands up, he suddenly lowered them—a gesture the assailants interpreted as an attempt to reach for a weapon. According to some sources, he suffered from gastric issues and only lowered his hands due to pain. There is disagreement regarding who fired the shot: while several sources attribute it to an unnamed soldier, Alcyr Lintz Geraldo concluded that it was more likely Agildo Barata himself.)

Once the operation at the 22nd BC concluded, the revolutionaries in João Pessoa occupied the School for Apprentice Sailors, the Port Captaincy, and various federal offices, including the Post and Telegraph agency. Machine guns were trained on a Navy vessel in the port of Sanhuá. Federal units throughout the rest of Paraíba were all brought into revolt by revolutionaries serving within their ranks: the 29th Battalion in Santa Luzia do Sabugi; the 24th and 25th Battalions in Cabedelo; the 21st Battalion in Campina Grande; and the 23rd Battalion in Sousa. The detachment stationed in Princesa under Captain João Facó headed to Flores, in Pernambuco, where it joined the Revolution on the 5th. Colonel José Pereira departed for exile. In Cabedelo, the Fort of Santa Catarina was equipped with old cannons, and the maritime and port workers were organized into a military-style force.

Resistance occurred only in Sousa: the battalion commander, Colonel Pedro Ângelo Correia—a staunch loyalist—responded with gunfire when ordered to surrender by the leader of the revolt, Lieutenant Ari Correia. By the early hours of the 4th, the colonel was under siege in his residence, accompanied by a few officers and his guards. During a 45-minute firefight, the commander (who died either from a grenade explosion or by being struck by a bullet while emerging from the house with a weapon in hand, depending on the source) and a major were killed.

=== Revolutionary columns ===
March of the revolutionary columns and garrison revolts in the Northeast and Pará

Within a single day, the revolutionaries had become masters of Paraíba, having rallied six federal battalions, the Public Force, and many civilians—including women—to their cause. Lieutenant Mamede, commissioned with the rank of colonel, organized the volunteer forces. Juarez Távora formed revolutionary columns to march upon other states. At his recommendation, José Américo de Almeida assumed the government of Paraíba as an interventor (appointed administrator). One of his priorities was to prevent heightened tensions from erupting into reprisals against the enemies of João Pessoa. The Legislative Assembly and municipal councils were dissolved.

The revolutionary army was organized into three columns. The northern column, under Colonel Landri Sales, was to head toward Fortaleza, Teresina, and São Luís, with its final objective being Belém. The other two columns were to converge at Alagoinhas, in Bahia: the eastern column, passing through Recife, Maceió, and Aracaju; and the northeastern column, via Petrolina and Juazeiro. Command of the eastern column was assigned to Juracy Magalhães, with Lieutenant Colonels Agildo Barata (Note: According to Agildo's memoirs, it was he who effectively commanded the northeastern column, as Juracy accompanied the entire march while ill, lying in a hammock. Juarez Távora denies this version.) in the vanguard and Paulo Cordeiro in charge of logistics. The northeastern column was placed under the command of Colonel Jurandir Mamede. The three columns were organized as brigades, composed of groups of light infantry battalions. There was a shortage of officers, such that only Juarez Távora possessed a formal general staff. Junior officers had to be commissioned into the ranks of senior officers (including all the column commanders), while sergeants were commissioned as junior officers. Platoons and machine-gun sections reported directly to battalion commanders, while mortar units were placed under the command of group leaders.

Troops were moving from Campina Grande and João Pessoa toward Pernambuco, from Santa Luzia toward Rio Grande do Norte, and from Sousa toward Ceará. The eastern column consisted of 1,200 men, thirty trucks, and twenty automobiles. By the time it reached Sergipe, it comprised one hundred trucks transporting soldiers and volunteers from Paraíba, Pernambuco, and Rio Grande do Norte, organized into five separate commands.

== Revolts in the capitals ==
The governments of Piauí, Rio Grande do Norte, Ceará, Maranhão, Alagoas, and Sergipe fell with little to no resistance. The government of Pernambuco was better prepared and engaged in combat on the streets of Recife, but ultimately fled, just like the others. The governors' lack of fighting spirit drew heavy criticism, yet their situation was genuinely difficult: they found themselves isolated, surrounded by a hostile populace, ineffective state police forces, and an army that was either indifferent or sympathetic to the enemy. Over the radio, rumors transformed Juarez's columns into massive hordes. The revolution even dominated the skies, with Commander Djalma Petit's (Note: Djalma Petit—according to his own account given to Correio da Manhã (published on November 8)—was a lieutenant commander in the Navy with experience in aviation, and was stationed in Natal. He joined the movement alongside other military personnel in Rio Grande do Norte. "On 8 October, I was summoned to Recife by General Juarez Tavora. I traveled there in a training aircraft belonging to the Aero Club (a Bluebird model). I then carried out several aerial reconnaissance missions and distributed bulletins and proclamations from the commander-in-chief.") small aircraft dropping proclamations intended to intimidate the incumbent administrations. And with each government that was toppled, the revolutionary army grew.

Washington Luís was irritated by the governors' flight and intended to appoint federal interveners once he had suppressed the revolution. Juarez and José Américo, however, appointed their own interveners to replace all the former governors. José Américo assumed the functions of the federal government in the Northeast, holding the final say over the decisions of the other regional administrations.

=== Recife ===
Military personnel in combat in Recife

In Recife, the Army and the Public Force were placed on alert following news that the revolution had begun in Rio Grande do Sul. The revolutionaries disabled telephone communications but failed to incite an uprising within the Public Force or the 21st BC. Their only available forces consisted of recruits from local Tiros de Guerra, mobilized by conspiring sergeants. In the early hours of 4 October, this group was repelled at the 21st Battalion's barracks, but they succeeded in seizing an arms and munitions depot in the Soledade neighborhood, which was only lightly defended. At daybreak, workers commuting to their jobs on streetcars were stopped and provided with weapons, ammunition, and instructions. This improvised revolutionary force grew to six hundred combatants under the leadership of Carlos de Lima Cavalcanti and Captain Muniz de Faria. According to historian Barbosa Lima Sobrinho, this was the only genuinely popular uprising during this phase of the revolution; unlike in Rio Grande do Sul, Minas Gerais, and Paraíba, the common people in Recife were not merely supporting actions taken by state governments or the military.

Throughout 4 October, the revolutionaries held a perimeter with a one-kilometer radius in Recife, fending off counterattacks by loyalist Army troops, the Public Force, and civilian volunteers. Governor Estácio Coimbra requested federal assistance and summoned Public Force detachments from the countryside, but these reinforcements were slow to arrive. By the end of the day, the vanguard of the revolutionary forces from Paraíba reached Paulista, within the territory of Pernambuco. The need to remain on guard against the Public Force delayed a journey that, under normal circumstances, would have taken only an hour. In the capital, the government's position deteriorated, and the fighting drew closer to the Government Palace. During the night of 4–5 October, Estácio Coimbra and the 21st Battalion of the Public Force left the city. The governor disembarked near Barreiros, where he intended to continue the resistance, but he soon realized there was a lack of weaponry and federal support. He remained in the municipality for only two days before departing for Maceió.

The column from Paraíba defeated a contingent of three hundred Public Force soldiers at Fragoso and reached Olinda, in the vicinity of Recife, at 17:30 on the 5th. The city was already under the control of local revolutionaries. Acting on behalf of Juarez Távora, Juracy Magalhães confirmed Carlos de Lima Cavalcanti as the head of the state government. A few loyalist strongholds persisted: the fire brigade, the Cinco Pontas battalion, and the guard at the House of Detention—the latter being the last to hold out. The prisoners were released on the 6th; among them, João Dantas and Augusto Caldas—who had been held there since the assassination of João Pessoa—were found dead. While the official account claimed suicide, historians argue that it was an execution carried out as an act of revenge. Until the situation could be normalized, mobs looted and set fire to the homes of those allied with the deposed government. During the days of fighting, Recife saw 38 deaths and 120 injuries. Juarez Távora arrived in the city on 6 October, and the revolutionary march continued southward.

=== Natal and Fortaleza ===
The public storms the Palácio da Luz in Fortaleza following the governor's departure

On 6 October, the 29th BC returned from Paraíba to Rio Grande do Norte. The local Public Force joined the movement, and Governor Juvenal Lamartine boarded the ship Itanagé, bound for Fortaleza. Captain Abelardo de Castro assumed power in his stead, pending the appointment of Irineu Joffily by Juarez Távora and José Américo.

In Fortaleza, the situation initially appeared unfavorable to the conspirators: only a small portion of the 23rd BC remained in the city, the Military College had no enlisted personnel, and efforts to incite an uprising within the Public Force proved unsuccessful. The state government, led by José de Matos Peixoto, placed the Public Force on alert. A detachment of the 23rd Battalion, stationed in Sousa, began its march toward Fortaleza on the morning of 6 October, under the command of Landri Sales. En route, this column stopped in Mossoró to gather additional forces.

Before the column could even arrive, on 8 October, Matos Peixoto abandoned the government, boarding Itanagé and subsequently transferring to another vessel, Afonso Pena, which sailed southward. Off the coast of Pernambuco, the ship was intercepted by an armed tugboat and escorted to the port of Recife, where the former governor was arrested. The revolutionaries released Manuel Fernandes Távora from prison and entrusted him with the state government. Landri Sales' column, bolstered by volunteers and the Ceará Public Force, had grown to two thousand men. On 18 October, they embarked for São Luís aboard the ships Afonso Pena, Tutóia, and Itapena.

=== Teresina and São Luís ===
In Piauí, Governor João de Deus Pires Leal was deposed by the 25th BC and replaced by the vice-governor, Humberto Areia Leão, at 17:30 on 4 October. The local Public Force offered no resistance. One revolutionary died during the attack on the Public Force barracks. A force marched along the Teresina–São Luís road and crossed the Parnaíba River, entering the territory of Maranhão. The position of the governor of Maranhão, José Pires Sexto, appeared stable; his Public Force was on alert. Following an inflammatory speech at the Artur Azevedo Theater, Reis Perdigão was arrested and subsequently released. A "patriotic battalion" was being organized to resist the offensive arriving from Piauí, under the command of Lieutenant Colonel Vieira Ferreira—a former commander of the Piauí Public Force—who had offered his services to the Maranhão government. Rumors spread that the revolutionaries defeated in Belém were heading toward Maranhão.

The conspirators in Maranhão planned to seize control of the 24th BC and, in the event of defeat, retreat to Piauí. On 7 October, after distributing messages to the public, the governor ordered the seizure of heavy weapons from the federal garrison, which he did not trust. Sergeant José Pires do Amorim resisted, arrested the battalion's officers, and launched the uprising. A firefight broke out across São Luís. The revolutionaries were at a disadvantage: the 24th BC consisted of no more than 140 soldiers—including the military band—as the remainder of the battalion was stationed in Paraíba. The legalist Public Force had four hundred men, who were better armed than the regular Army. At 02:15—with an offensive against the Government Palace scheduled for daybreak—Reis Perdigão and Lieutenant Celso Freitas telephoned the governor to demand his surrender. Pires Sexto and his aides boarded the ship Itapicuru and took refuge in Pará. A governing junta subsequently assumed power.

Senator Magalhães de Almeida devised a plan to retake Maranhão using legalist troops from Amazonas and Pará. While passing through São Luís aboard the auxiliary cruiser Pará, he shared his intentions with the crew. The ship's executive officer, Macedo Soares Guimarães, tipped off the revolutionary radio operators. The junta sent a telegram to the vessel, stating that Colonel Landri Sales' brigade—described as possessing "formidable combat efficiency"—was already in the city, and that any political allies of the incumbent administration would be held responsible for the first shot fired at the capital. The ship simply continued on its voyage to Belém. In São Luís, local forces reinforced Landri Sales' brigade in preparation for the eventual conquest of Belém. The revolutionaries from Pará had honored their commitments by attempting an uprising of the 26th BC between the 5th and 6th, but they were defeated. A group of about thirty managed to reach São Luís by boat.

=== Maceió and Aracaju ===
Passage of revolutionary troops through Maceió

In Alagoas and Sergipe, governors Álvaro Pais and Manoel Dantas abandoned their respective state capitals and took refuge in Salvador on the 10th and 16th, respectively. In both states, Commander Petit dropped leaflets from an aircraft demanding the government's surrender, while rumors spread regarding the imminent arrival of revolutionary troops. In Alagoas, following the departure of Álvaro Pais, the commander of the Public Force, Major Reginal Teixeira, conferred by telephone with Juarez Távora. His unit had only enough ammunition for twenty minutes of combat and offered no resistance when the federal troops joined the revolution. The provisional government was assumed by the major and subsequently by Hermilio Freitas Melro, who was selected following discussions between Juarez Távora, José Américo, and local politicians. In Sergipe, the state government was taken over by Lieutenant Heronildes de Carvalho and later handed over to retired General José Calazans. Juarez relocated his command post to the ship Joaquim Távora, which was docked in Aracaju.

== Bahia campaign ==
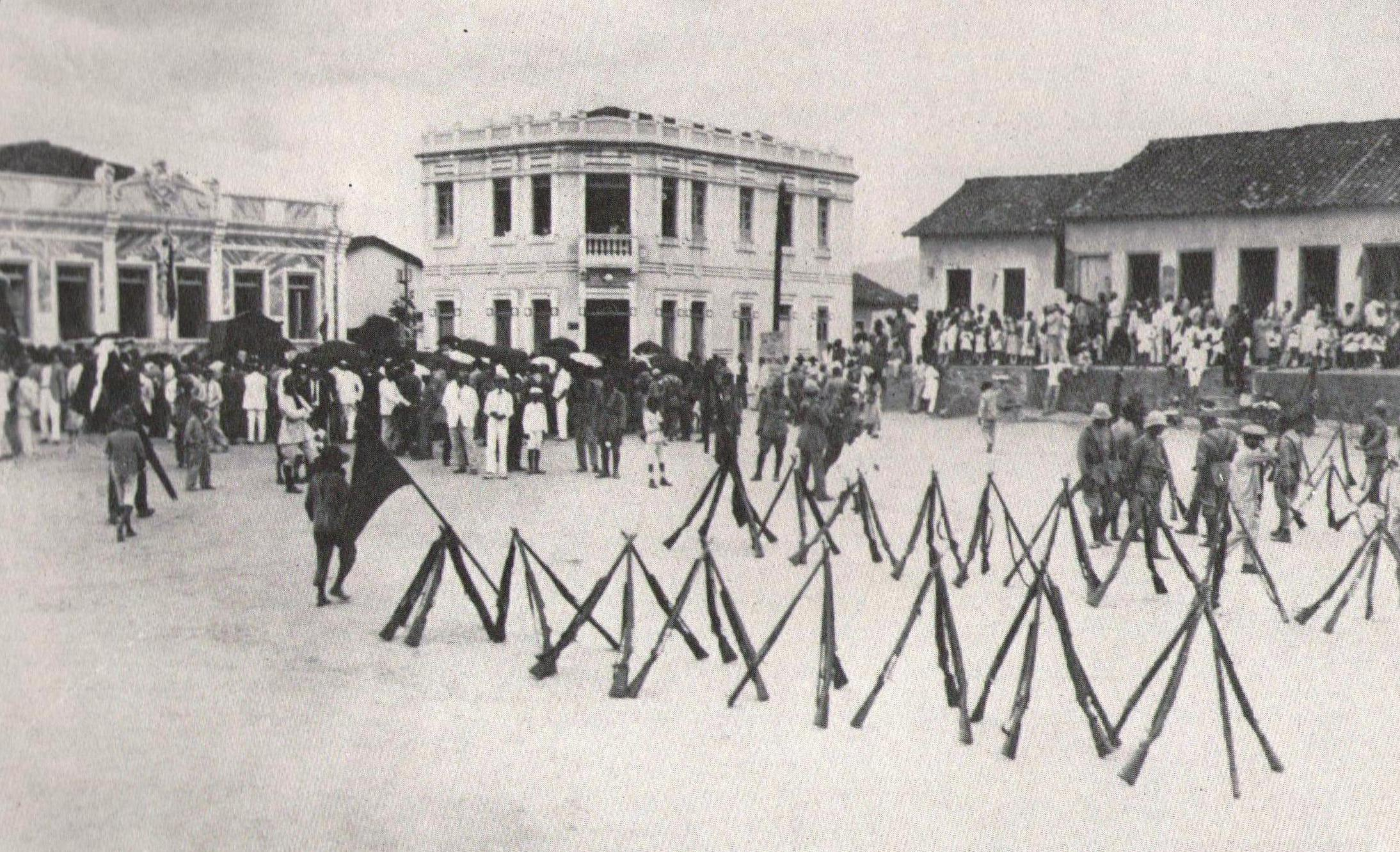
Military personnel in Jequié after the revolution

Bahia remained ostensibly loyal to the federal government until the end of the revolution: Salvador served as the legalist stronghold in the north. On 11 October, Washington Luís appointed General Antenor de Santa Cruz Pereira de Abreu to coordinate the legalist defense in Bahia, placing him in command of the Forces Operating in the North of the Republic (FONR). Revolutionary armies prepared to invade Bahia from both the north and the south. The government of Espírito Santo fell on 19 October, leaving Bahia isolated. By the end of the revolution, Salvador faced food shortages, and commerce had ground to a halt due to the closure of banks and the Caixa Econômica. Port activity was minimal, as food exports had been suspended. Public offices operated on a reduced schedule, and the press was subject to censorship.

The delay of the revolution in Bahia can be attributed to a lack of coordination among local revolutionary cells. Initially, it proved impossible to incite an uprising within the federal garrison. In early October, Lieutenant Monteiro was stationed at a temporary post in Ilhéus, while Souza Melo was sidelined with a broken leg following a fall from his horse. Monteiro and João Costa did not manage to return to Salvador until 8 October. Hanequim Dantas did his best to alert the conspirators, but he lacked the capacity to launch an uprising on his own. He was eventually arrested and sent to Rio de Janeiro. As for civilian allies, according to Lieutenant Monteiro, "they are very useful and readily available when an uprising proves successful—as was the case in Rio Grande, Paraíba, and Minas, where the state governments were on board. [...] Uprisings by civilian elements existed only in the promises of opposition politicians and held no military value whatsoever."

=== Loyalist mobilization ===
==== Regular forces ====
While the loyalists prepared the defense of Bahia, the 17 October issue of Diario da Manhã celebrated the "legionnaires" who had "just conquered the state of Sergipe" and were "marching victoriously toward the stronghold of the Bahia oligarchy"

General Santa Cruz did not trust the Public Force or even his own federal garrison; he established his command aboard a ship. The federal troops were merely waiting for an opportunity to defect, and the Public Force could do little to stop them. The press and the authorities insisted that calm prevailed in Bahia. The announcement calling up reservists included the caveat that they would initially be assigned to protect cities rather than being sent to the front lines. Colonel Afonso Ribeiro, of the 28th BC, relayed information to Juarez from a cattle trader arriving from Bahia: the Public Force had reportedly increased its strength by six thousand men, and there were two aircraft in Salvador—one for mail service to Rio and another at the disposal of General Santa Cruz—as well as two in Ilhéus, one of which belonged to the Navy.

The 19th BC called up first- and second-category reservists from the cohorts of 1900 to 1908, in ascending order of age, including members of military associations, Tiros de Guerra, and similar organizations. Officially, this was merely a measure to reach "normal peacetime strength." The battalion busied itself with requests for uniforms and weaponry in preparation for the impending operations. The battalion command reassigned duties to sideline potentially dangerous officers, but several of these changes had the opposite effect—such as the case of Lieutenant Souza Melo, a conspirator who was appointed to a commission tasked with inspecting the armaments. In the southern part of the state, by 18 October, 150 men had embarked from Capivari, twelve from Água Preta, 133 from Ilhéus, and 120 from Itabuna. There were also instances of refusal. The reservists from the Canavieiras Tiro de Guerra decided to remain in the town, arguing that the police force had already departed and they could not leave the area unprotected against a "horde of starving people."

The Navy formed a naval division to operate out of Salvador. Its commander, Captain Henrique Aristides Guilhem, arrived on 13 October aboard the auxiliary cruiser Pará; he was later joined by the auxiliary cruisers Aratimbó and Itagibe, the cruiser Rio Grande do Sul, and the tender Belmonte. Rio Grande do Sul was en route to Recife when it received news of the city's fall, along with orders to proceed to Salvador instead. The 1985 edition of História Naval Brasileira (Brazilian Naval History) criticizes these operations, noting that the Navy had only one true warship—Rio Grande do Sul—in a vast theater of operations. The naval division remained passive, even though it might have been able to alter the course of events in Recife. Concentrating these assets in Salvador left the coastline further north in the hands of the revolutionaries. The battleship São Paulo departed from Rio de Janeiro on 21 October, bound for Salvador, but did not arrive until after hostilities had already ceased.
