= Brazilian Revolution of 1930 in Recife =

Revolution of 1930 in Recife
- Part of the Revolution of 1930
- Battle at the José Mariano Wharf on 5 October
Date	4–6 October 1930
Location	Recife, Pernambuco, Brazil
Result	Revolutionary victory: Ousting of governor Estácio Coimbra

Belligerents
Revolutionaries; Army; Civilian volunteers	Loyalists; Pernambuco Police; Army; Civilian volunteers

Commanders and leaders
Carlos de Lima Cavalcanti; Muniz de Faria	Estácio Coimbra; Antenor de Santa Cruz

Strength
600 men (5 October)	Unknown

Casualties and losses
- 38 dead and 120 or 124 wounded

In Recife, the Revolution of 1930 ousted the Pernambuco government—led by Estácio Coimbra—and brought opposition leader Carlos de Lima Cavalcanti to power. From 4 to 6 October, loyalist forces from the Army, the Public Force, and irregular units clashed with civilians organized by a small group of conspirators. Even before revolutionary reinforcements arrived from Paraíba, the state president (governor) abandoned the Government Palace. The revolutionary campaign then extended to neighboring states.

The revolutionaries' plan called for simultaneous uprisings across the country, including in Recife, then Northeastern Brazil's principal port city. Telephone lines were to be cut, and the city quickly seized through a mutiny involving the Public Force—where Captain Muniz de Faria was conspiring—and the local Army unit, the 21st Light Infanty Battalion (21st BC). Due to a communication error, the uprisings in Rio Grande do Sul and Minas Gerais began a few hours earlier. The Pernambuco government was alerted, and military units were placed on high alert, thwarting the original plan. The revolutionaries' only available troops were a few Tiros de Guerra (local military training unit) recruits called up by conspiring sergeants.

In the early hours of 4 October, the revolutionaries seized the munitions depot at the Soledade barracks and distributed the stockpiled weapons to hundreds of civilians—an event historian Barbosa Lima Sobrinho described as the only genuinely popular uprising of that phase of the 1930 Revolution. Led by Carlos de Lima and a handful of officers, the revolutionaries repelled every attack. The populace rallied to the revolution, and reinforcements from Paraíba were soon to arrive. By day's end, the fighting was drawing closer to the 21st BC barracks and the Government Palace. Authorities abandoned the city; Estácio Coimbra briefly considered mounting a resistance in Barreiros but ultimately left the state for good.

On the 5th, reinforcements arrived, and the last loyalist strongholds were besieged. At the House of Detention, prisoners were released on the 6th. João Duarte Dantas and Augusto Caldas—held there since the assassination of João Pessoa in July—died; there are conflicting accounts suggesting either suicide or an act of revenge. The fighting resulted in 38 deaths and 120 injuries, and the homes of representatives of the deposed government were ransacked. Juarez Távora, the military leader of the revolution in Northeastern Brazil, confirmed Carlos de Lima's assumption of the governorship of Pernambuco, a position he would hold until 1937.

== Background ==
=== Recife in the 1930s ===
Map of the city of Recife in 1906

The capital of Pernambuco was a port metropolis oriented toward Europe and fueled by the hinterland—not only of Pernambuco itself but of an entire sphere of influence across the states of the Brazilian Northeast. Railways from the Zona da Mata and the Agreste regions converged on the port of Recife—the third-largest by volume in the early Republic and the primary shipping hub for Alagoas, Paraíba, Rio Grande do Norte, and parts of Ceará and Piauí. Pernambuco held a dominant position in the Northeastern economy.

Recife's population was more than six times that of the state's second-largest municipality, and the city accounted for 60% to 70% of state income. Ambitious young members of the Northeastern elite settled in Recife to attend the Law School or pursue careers in business, journalism, and related fields. Society there had a cosmopolitan flair, contrasting with the austerity of the countryside—a region urban Northeasterners associated with backwardness and savagery. Many foreign governments maintained consulates or consular representatives, and foreign communities were numerous. Amidst repeated political crises, clashes involving police, militias, and hired gunmen, along with federal interventions, earned the city the nickname "Bloody Recife".

The capital's urban population growth rate was 3.3% between 1900 and 1960, compared to 6.8% for Belo Horizonte and 7% for São Paulo. Northeastern Brazil as a whole was declining relative to the Center-South in terms of demographic, economic, and political power. Regarding sugar—a key export through the port of Recife—Pernambuco's share of national production fell from 41.5% in 1907 to 25.2% in 1937.

=== Political context ===
Estácio Coimbra does not allow the people of Paraíba to cross Pernambuco to fight the Princesa Revolt (Careta magazine)

In the arena of interstate politics, by the 1930s, Pernambuco had seen a significant decline from the prestigious position it held during the Brazilian Empire, mirroring the decline of the Northeast as a whole. It was a state of moderate importance—comparable to Rio de Janeiro and Bahia, yet less influential than Minas Gerais, São Paulo, and Rio Grande do Sul—though it wielded more influence than mere statistics might suggest. It maintained a respectful stance toward the federal government and the more powerful states of the Center-South, while asserting hegemony over its Northeastern neighbors and positioning itself as the region's champion. By the 1930s, however, the state could no longer even ensure its interests prevailed over its weaker neighbors.

The State President (governor) in 1930 was Estácio Coimbra, elected for the four-year term that began in 1926. The political climate was relatively calm. Prior to holding this office, Estácio had served as vice-president of Brazil under Artur Bernardes (1922–1926), thereby maintaining an appearance of state power on the national stage. In the 1930 presidential election, Pernambuco—like the majority of states—had supported the incumbent-backed candidate, Júlio Prestes of São Paulo. The losing ticket was that of the Liberal Alliance, led by Getúlio Vargas (President of Rio Grande do Sul) and João Pessoa (President of Paraíba). Campaign speakers for the Liberal Alliance had already alluded to the possibility of enforcing their platform by force of arms if the ballot box failed to yield the desired result.

From February to August 1930, the interior of Paraíba was engulfed by the Revolt of Princesa—an armed uprising by a dissident local political faction led by Colonel José Pereira Lima against the administration of João Pessoa. The area affected by the revolt bordered Pernambuco. Neighboring state governments, including that of Pernambuco, mobilized their Public Forces and closed their borders. Vehicles belonging to individuals linked to the Paraíba government were searched in the border zone. Paraíba troops were denied permission to pass through Pernambuco to attack Princesa. At the same time, the Pernambuco government turned a blind eye to the flow of resources supporting the rebels' war effort. The first weapons to reach Princesa came from the stockpiles of the Public Force of Pernambuco. The Pernambuco municipality of São José do Egito served as headquarters for José Pereira. Princesa also enjoyed the support of Júlio Prestes and the São Paulo state government.

On 26 July, João Pessoa was assassinated in Recife by a political rival from Paraíba, João Dantas. The entire country was gripped by an atmosphere of revolt, and Getúlio Vargas accelerated conspiracy efforts. The federal government concentrated Army troops in Paraíba—including units from the 21st Light Infantry Battalion (21.º BC) based in Recife—and the rebels in Princesa laid down their arms.

=== Local conspiracy ===
Carlos de Lima Cavalcanti (left) and Captain Muniz de Faria (right)

Captain Juarez Távora assumed military command of the revolutionary conspiracy across Northern and Northeastern Brazil. He delegated the movement's civil leadership in Pernambuco to Carlos de Lima Cavalcanti, assisted by his brothers Caio and Rui. Carlos de Lima was a former Congressman and director of the newspapers Diário da Manhã and Diário da Tarde—the state opposition's primary mouthpieces—through which he openly expressed support for the Prestes Column during the 1920s and disseminated the ideals of the future revolution throughout the Northeast. He and his brother Caio represented a dissident faction of Pernambuco's sugar mill owning elite.

On the military front, the conspirators included Captain Muniz de Faria—a retired officer of the Public Force—along with other high-ranking members of that corps; Lieutenants Sebastião Mendes de Holanda and Aluísio de Andrade Moura and Sergeants Kleber de Morais and José Pessoa of the 21st Light Infantry Battalion (BC); and Sergeants Nelson Cavalcanti and Helly Cavalcanti Gomes Sobrinho of the Tiros de Guerra (local military training detachments). On 12 April, Juarez Távora arrived in Recife and made contact with Carlos and Caio de Lima. They, in turn, had ties to the government of Paraíba.

The plan called for the rapid military occupation of Recife as part of simultaneous military uprisings across the North and Northeast. Under the plan, the 21st BC was to be mobilized for the revolt by Lieutenant Holanda and Sergeants Kleber de Morais and José Pessoa. In the event of failure, marksmen from three Tiros de Guerra units—led by Sergeants Nelson and Helly Cavalcanti to a garden facing the barracks—would fire at the main gate to prevent the battalion from exiting. Simultaneously, armed groups would attack the Government Palace, Police Headquarters, newspaper offices, and the homes of pro-government leaders. Captain Muniz de Faria was to incite an uprising within the Public Force. The Lima Cavalcanti brothers were to disable the Telephone Company. To this end, two weeks prior to the uprising, Caio de Lima visited the station under the pretext of working on a story for the Diário da Manhã.

On 2 October, Sergeant Helly Cavalcanti was tasked with mobilizing the Tiros de Guerra and the 21st BC. At Caio Cavalcanti's home, Carlos de Lima handed him weapons, ammunition, and red lanterns. At the 21st BC barracks, Lieutenant Aluísio Moura informed Sergeant Helly that the uprising would begin at 01:00 on 4 October. This time was relayed to Sergeants Nelson Cavalcanti, Agapito Colares, José Pessoa, and Castor Menezes. Lieutenant Aluísio traveled to Campina Grande, Paraíba, to incite the 21st BC company stationed there to revolt, while Lieutenant Mendes Holanda went to João Pessoa. The start time communicated to the conspirators in the Northeast was actually the result of a communication error between Juarez Távora and Oswaldo Aranha in Rio Grande do Sul. The revolutionary movement began in Rio Grande do Sul and Minas Gerais at 17:30 on 3 October, thereby eliminating the element of surprise in the Northeast.

== Armed revolt ==
The Pernambuco government was informed of the outbreak of the insurrection in Rio Grande do Sul and Minas Gerais at 17:30 on 3 October. The Public Force and the Army were placed on alert. However, according to Barbosa Lima Sobrinho, the Pernambuco government's reaction was uncoordinated and inept, and "the state of readiness claimed to have existed in Pernambuco is nonsense." The revolutionaries began with limited resources, and the loyalists could have won had they seized the initiative.

The loyalist commander was General Antenor de Santa Cruz Pereira de Abreu, with his headquarters established aboard the ship Comandante Capela. The Public Force was commanded by an Army officer, Colonel Wolmer da Silveira. This force numbered little more than three thousand men in the 1920s, most of them poorly trained and undernourished recruits from the sertão. Public Forces—which states during the First Republic militarized as a safeguard against federal intervention—were not a significant force in the Northeast. The 3rd Battalion of the Pernambuco force was stationed in Floresta to combat banditry, while another battalion was responsible for distributing troops to detachments in the countryside. In the capital, the only available units were the Derby Battalion and João de Barros' cavalry regiment. The federal contingent consisted solely of the 21st Light Infantry Battalion, commanded by Colonel Negreiros. Command operations were based at the Derby barracks.

=== Plan execution ===
The Tiro de Guerra 333

Captain Muniz de Faria failed to incite a mutiny within the Public Force, nor was the 21st Light Infantry Battalion successfully seized. The Lima Cavalcanti brothers managed to damage the Telephone Company's facilities. After discovering the telephone lines were dead, they left the station to evade the approaching police.

The conspiring sergeants gathered 38 rifles from Tiro de Guerra 333 and the Military Instruction School of the Ginásio Pernambucano. Trainee soldiers from these two establishments, as well as from the Ginásio do Recife and the Brazilian Baptist School, were summoned to a meeting at Tiro 333 at 20:00 on 3 October, ostensibly for a rehearsal for the flag-swearing ceremony. Many were sons of Pernambuco's high society. With the trainees formed up, the sergeants selected forty of them. The others, under the command of Sergeant Agapito Soares, were ordered to wait for further instructions at Sérgio Loreto Square at midnight. Sergeant Helly organized the forty selected trainees into marching formation, killing time by maneuvering through the streets while waiting for the appointed hour. Very few understood the purpose of these orders. They were issued ammunition and informed of the plan only when the time came to march on the 21st BC barracks. By then, Police Inspector Ramos de Freitas and Captain Fontenelle—the Tiro de Guerra inspector for the 7th Military Region—were already searching for Sergeant Helly.

The trainees waited in concealment on the left side of the Normal School, near the 21st BC. Upon arriving at the site, the conspirators discovered that the unit was on alert, with the entire officer corps present in the barracks. Even so, Helly attempted to seize the barracks. According to the plan, they were to be greeted with cheers for the revolution, but the response was a volley of gunfire from inside the building. The attackers returned fire, though not for long. Ammunition was scarce, and several of the wounded were in serious condition. At that moment, Juarez Távora, Carlos de Lima, and Lieutenants Holanda and Albuquerque Lima appeared. Holanda managed to bring along a combat unit as well as the guard from the 21st BC hospital. Juarez left for Paraíba, promising to return with reinforcements, and left the attackers to handle the situation on their own. Lieutenant Holanda and Sergeant Kleber would later be taken prisoner.

=== Occupation of the Soledade barracks ===
Military personnel in combat in Recife

The remnants of this operation decided to occupy the Soledade barracks, which housed the munitions depot. Depending on the source, the suggestion is attributed either to Captain Muniz de Faria or to Lieutenant Holanda. The government had neglected the defense of that position, leaving behind only half a dozen—or perhaps up to thirty—guards, who had already been swayed by opposition propaganda. Their commander, Sergeant Pedro Primeiro, was disarmed by the revolutionaries' emissaries, and the guardsmen were ordered to fall in. Government forces chose not to attack at night to avoid damaging the property.

The stockpiles could have armed five thousand men, yet the revolutionaries numbered only fifty. Nearby, workers were heading to their jobs at daybreak. Captain Muniz de Faria stopped the streetcars, sent the women and children back, and armed the men. After brief instructions, he dispatched them to occupy bridges and various parts of the city to facilitate the arrival of reinforcements. The revolutionary army grew to six hundred combatants. It consisted of hundreds of civilians led by three or four officers—a stark contrast to the situation in Rio Grande do Sul, Minas Gerais, and Paraíba, where civilians merely played a supporting role to government and military actions. The core group of revolutionaries, including the civilian conspirators, numbered no more than one hundred individuals. In the view of Barbosa Lima Sobrinho, "the Recife movement was the only genuinely popular one among all those that took place on that day of revolt."

The newspaper Diário da Manhã reported the presence of "fruit and vegetable vendors, peddlers, shop assistants, university students, and merchants" in the trenches. Cristiano Cordeiro, the principal leader of the Pernambuco branch of the Brazilian Communist Party, supported the revolution in defiance of his party's directives. Automatic weapons, along with ample ammunition, were positioned atop the Fratelli Vita Building and the Nóbrega School. Some armed groups fired indiscriminately in the streets. Loyalists counterattacked (Note: According to Aníbal Fernandes, there was no attack before noon that could have easily quelled the uprising. Alcyr Lintz Geraldo mentions that "the entire day was marked by attacks on the insurgent positions".) using the 21st BC—an infantry battalion—as well as the Public Force, firefighters, and civilian "provisionals" recruited by the Pessoa de Queiroz brothers. All attacks were repelled. By morning, the Public Force had lost two armored vehicles, weighing 1.5 and 1.2 tons respectively. These were riot-control vehicles, and their armor could not withstand fire from Mauser rifles.

By the end of the day, the revolutionaries controlled a one-kilometer radius around the Soledade barracks. People flocked to the site to obtain weapons, while the loyalist response fragmented. Nevertheless, the 21st BC controlled the bridges connecting the neighborhoods: at the Boa Vista, Santa Isabel, and Saneamento crossings, the Santo Antônio and Recife neighborhoods were shielded from the center of the revolt in the Boa Vista neighborhood. The state president took whatever measures were within his power: he requested aid from the federal government, coordinated the defense with federal forces, and ordered the return of police detachments stationed along railway lines in the countryside. Police Inspector Ramos de Freitas led raids on student boarding houses, hotels, guesthouses, bars, working-class neighborhoods, and the offices of opposition newspapers.

=== Withdrawals and Surrenders ===
Federal officers at the Public Force barracks

At the end of 4 October, the revolutionaries informed Major Manoel Gomes, commander of the 21st BC, that he would be attacked the following dawn by the largest possible revolutionary force. The situation facing the Pernambuco government was critical. Battalions from the countryside would be slow to arrive. The Public Force troops remained stationary in their barracks. The Government Palace was threatened by attacks coming from Aurora and Santo Amaro streets and the Santa Isabel Bridge. Estácio was dining with his cabinet aide, the young sociologist Gilberto Freyre. Outwardly, the routine continued, but the atmosphere was one of hysteria.

The commander of the 21st BC recommended that the president leave the Palace. Estácio was informed that the Army had closed the Santa Isabel Bridge to block the rebels and that the defense would have to be mounted at the seat of government itself. If necessary, the president could take refuge in the Santa Isabel Theater, the Department of Agriculture, or—in a worst-case scenario—the Apprentice Sailors' School, the Docks, or the Port Authority headquarters in the Recife district. Some time later, Lieutenant Colonel João Alberto de Souza reported that defending the bridge was no longer possible. An emissary sent by the president returned from the port with the news that the very soldiers from the 21st BC assigned to defend the bridge were boarding vessels to leave the city. Only the Palace guard remained. Reports coming in by telephone indicated that reinforcements led by Juarez Távora were arriving in Olinda.

According to State Deputy Aníbal Fernandes, remaining at the Recife Docks would mean "capture and humiliation, if not a massacre." The president chose to board a tugboat with his friends shortly before midnight, having fled via the Buarque de Macedo Bridge. At 10:00 the following day, they disembarked at the Gravatá landing point. From there, they hoped to rally their forces and await federal assistance in the municipality of Barreiros. Gilberto Freyre defends this course of action: "The Governor of Pernambuco was so far from intending to abandon the government that he left with only a small bag containing a bar of soap, a face towel, and a toothbrush. Nothing else. It was a matter of spending one night away from the Palace to facilitate a military operation." The government was re-established in Barreiros but lasted only two days. A loyalist rural guerrilla campaign was anticipated, but it never materialized. Realizing the scarcity of weaponry and the lack of federal support, Estácio Coimbra departed for Maceió.

At 23:00 on the 4th, news circulated that the government had fled. At 5:00 on the 5th, Major Gomes boarded the ship Itanagé, taking with him the Bank of Brazil's cash reserves—a retreat that would eventually lead the loyalists of the 21st BC to Natal, Fortaleza, and Salvador. The military personnel who had joined the revolution remained behind. Civilians occupied the barracks and seized the weapons. Caio de Lima led a group toward Santo Amaro to reach Olinda. According to the newspaper Diário da Tarde, "at Largo do Hospício, Canon Jerônimo de Assumpção blessed a large red flag. Once the flag was spread upon the ground, the people knelt around it and prayed." Sergeants Helly and Pessoa found the Police Headquarters abandoned by its staff and released the prisoners who had been held there since the failed attack on the 21st BC.

The revolutionaries were already showing signs of fatigue and asking when reinforcements would arrive. Carlos de Lima issued a message announcing revolutionary victories across the country and calling for patience. He was responsible for a Revolutionary Bulletin—printed at the Fratelli Vita facilities—that circulated through the trenches and streets. He also signed requisitions for food for the troops. At 10:00 or 11:00 on the 5th—or perhaps in the early afternoon—the Public Force barracks at Derby raised a flag of surrender in anticipation of an imminent revolutionary attack. Colonel Wolmer Silveira informed Sergeant Helly that he was dismayed by Estácio Coimbra’s flight and did not wish to prolong the bloodshed. All the officers surrendered as prisoners. At 16:00, the Public Force cavalry unit on João de Barros did the same.

=== Reinforcement columns ===
While events unfolded in Recife, federal garrisons in the capital of Paraíba were subdued during the early hours of 4 October. At 03:30, the first reinforcement column for the revolutionaries in Pernambuco set out, comprising eighty men, twenty automatic weapons, three automobiles, and twenty trucks under the command of Lieutenant Agildo Barata. Another detachment followed behind, commanded by Lieutenant Paulo Cordeiro. The one-hundred-kilometer distance between the capitals (João Pessoa and Recife) could be covered in just over an hour, but the reinforcements were delayed by Pernambuco Public Force detachments along the route; these units had to be disarmed and posed a risk of ambushing the vanguard.

Agildo Barata's vanguard reached Paulista, twenty kilometers from Olinda, late on 4 October. He avoided engaging the Lundgren Factory—where loyalists armed with machine guns were stationed—and pressed on. At the locality of Fragoso, he was blocked by approximately three hundred men from the Pernambuco Public Force, commanded by Major Pessoa. Agildo deployed his troops along the small rises bordering the road. Following the arrival of reinforcements (Lieutenant Juracy Magalhães and Paulo Cordeiro's detachment), the revolutionaries launched a dawn attack involving a surprise strike on the loyalist command post, a frontal assault by Agildo's column, and a flanking maneuver from the rear. The loyalists fled, and the way was clear to enter Olinda in the early hours of the 5th. Establishing a bridgehead on the link between Olinda and Recife, the troops from Paraíba entered the Pernambuco capital at 17:30, finding the city in the hands of the revolutionaries. There were 680 enlisted men in total.

=== Last loyalist stronghold ===
March following the victory of the revolution

With the arrival of reinforcements from Paraíba, General Santa Cruz withdrew to Bahia. Some remaining loyalist forces were still fighting: the firefighters, the Cinco Pontas Battalion, and the guard at the House of Detention—the latter also housing those defeated in the Battle of Fragoso. At 14:00 on 5 October, Carlos de Lima Cavalcanti assumed the governorship of Pernambuco. The ceremony took place not at the Government Palace but at the barracks of the 21st BC, from where the administration would operate for a few days. Juracy Magalhães confirmed his appointment on behalf of Juarez Távora. Military command was held by Captain Muniz de Farias. At 21:00 on 6 October, the people acclaimed Carlos de Lima at the Government Palace.

According to a report in the Diário da Tarde: "The firefighters entrenched on Glória, Velha, and Matriz Streets retreated to the sanitary pavilion at the foot of the Boa Vista Bridge. The men are firing bravely. Throughout the hours of combat, these heroes are attended to by families living nearby, who offer them snacks, drinks, and clothing—all given with joy." The House of Detention put up the longest resistance. Revolutionaries waved red cloths from within their cells. Water and electricity were cut off, and the legalist commander, Major Cavalcanti, was ordered to surrender within two hours. The stronghold fell on the afternoon of the 6th, according to Barbosa Lima Sobrinho, or in the early hours of the morning, according to reporter Pedro Lopes Júnior, who had been held prisoner by the legalists since the start of the revolution. At 15:00, the prisoners were told, "You've won," and at 18:00, they were released. "It was only later that we were informed that had government forces triumphed, we would have been executed by firing squad".

João Dantas and Augusto Caldas had been held at the facility since the assassination of João Pessoa. A note written by Dantas stated: "The Detention Center is being taken over in the dead of night. Our situation, as one can imagine, is the worst possible. We remain in the same room, but we have been threatened with being slaughtered in the public square of Paraíba or right here". Both prisoners died after the Detention Center was captured. The official version is suicide, but some historians believe they were executed by the Paraíba Public Force. According to Hélio Silva, "It is certain that the men from Paraíba went to Recife determined to avenge the death of João Pessoa". (Note: According to Diario de Pernambuco, 7 October, p. 3, Dantas was found dead at 15:30.)

=== Retaliations and normalization ===
Pessoa de Queiroz Mansion, vandalized by the people following the victory of the revolution

The cruiser Rio Grande do Sul was en route to Recife to aid the loyalists when it received news of the city's fall. It was ordered to sail to Natal, but following the fall of that city as well, it returned to Salvador. Juarez Távora arrived in Recife on 6 October and established his headquarters at the Law School, from where he directed the revolutionary march southward. Command was later transferred to Aracaju.

João Barreto de Menezes described the "fervor of the movement" and the "intoxication of triumph" directed against those ousted from power. On the 7th, the Jornal do Recife reported: "The people's indignation defies description. It is impossible to describe what they did yesterday. Every streetlamp on Horta, Lomas Valentinas, and Viração streets, as well as at Pátio de São Pedro, etc., was damaged. The politicians' homes that were attacked and completely wrecked were empty; they had been abandoned, and thus there was no loss of life." Journalists Aníbal Fernandes and Souza Barros (of A Noite) and Morais de Oliveira (correspondent for Rio's O Jornal) were arrested.

Maritime Police Inspector Renato de Medeiros reportedly had his home looted and set on fire, only to be subsequently "exposed to public mockery" in the Olinda jail. Gilberto Freyre reported "seventeen residences looted—with goods hauled away by truck—and set on fire by small groups from Paraíba who sought to pass themselves off as an outraged populace. Estácio Coimbra was being hunted down to be castrated and then executed by firing squad; he was the primary target of their hatred. Aníbal Fernandes and I learned that among the houses burned and looted were his and my parents' homes in the Madalena neighborhood." According to Aníbal Fernandes, the printing plants and newsrooms of the Jornal do Commercio, A Província, and Jornal Pequeno were set ablaze. "José Maria Belo's mother's house was invaded and everything inside wrecked. Nobre de Lacerda's house suffered the same fate. Throughout the city and its outskirts, the order was to burn and destroy anything belonging to the incumbent politicians." "Bartolomeu Anacleto's house was invaded and everything wrecked. The home of the Municipal Market administrator was reduced to ashes. Demócrito de Souza's house met the same end. My own home was invaded; everything stealable was smashed or taken, though it wasn't set on fire because the neighbor's house had to be spared."

On the 7th, businesses opened as usual, though bread and meat were still in short supply at the market. Electricity and telephone services were being restored. Lack of discipline was an issue: the new police chief banned the sale of alcohol to soldiers and militarized civilians. Street demonstrations continued on the 8th, and the government urged the public to view the moment as one "for recovery, not revenge," promising to "severely repress any attack on the persons or property of the defeated adversaries." Carlos de Lima Cavalcanti appointed Professor Lauro Borba as mayor of Recife. Public Force soldiers, magistrates and court officials, and tax agents and collectors from the Secretariat of Finance were ordered to return to work, while the public was required to surrender the weapons distributed during the revolution. Parades celebrated news of the revolution in other states. José Américo de Almeida, the president of Paraíba, assumed federal government duties in the Northeast, as reported by the Jornal do Recife on the 9th.

=== Casualties ===
The toll from the fighting was 38 dead and 120 wounded taken to hospitals. Another source recorded 124 wounded, distributed among Dr. Roesler's Clinic, the Public Assistance Service, the Field Hospital, and the Military Hospital. On the 7th, Recife newspapers highlighted three of the dead: the sons of Mário de Souza and Manoel Caetano, and a young German woman. The others included ten soldiers, a sailor, civilians, and laborers—among them a stevedore, a tailor, a blacksmith, a shop clerk, a machine operator, and a streetcar conductor. A team of forensic doctors and gravediggers buried them on the 7th, between 10:00 and 17:00, at a site near the Santo Amaro morgue. Some could not be identified. During the sharpshooters' attack on the 21st Infantry Battalion barracks, two revolutionaries were killed; one of them was the son of the Law School dean.

== Aftermath ==
Acclamation of Juarez Távora and Carlos de Lima Cavalcanti at the Government Palace

On 16 October, President Washington Luís appointed General Santa Cruz as federal interventor in Pernambuco, citing that "as a consequence of the subversive movement that erupted in the states of Minas Gerais, Rio Grande do Sul, and Paraíba, the territory of the state of Pernambuco has been invaded by rebel forces that seized the city of Recife, placing the state in a full-blown civil war." The measure was futile. The governments of Piauí, Rio Grande do Norte, Ceará, Maranhão, Alagoas, and Sergipe fell with little to no resistance. If not even Pernambuco—with its superior resources—could withstand the Revolution, then certainly the others could not, given their inefficient state militias, hostile populations, and federal garrisons that were either apathetic or sympathetic to the opposition.

The revolution triumphed, elevating Getúlio Vargas to the Presidency of Brazil. State governments came to be led by interventors appointed by the federal government. In most Northeastern states, these interventors were Tenentist military officers with no ties to local electorates, or else individuals loyal to the administration and its ostensibly apolitical revolutionary goals. Pernambuco was the exception: Vargas kept Carlos de Lima Cavalcanti—a civilian and former local opposition politician—in power. The new administration was staffed by prominent figures from the conspiracy and the revolution. For the defeated, a reckoning followed: the Lundgren family had to pay seventeen years of due taxes, and an old police case involving the Brito brothers was reopened.

Carlos de Lima remained in office until the establishment of the Estado Novo in 1937. In 1931, his administration faced three minor uprisings in Recife: a mutiny by employees of the Miranda Teixeira firm in April, a military revolt at the Dérbi barracks in May, and another at the 21st BC in October. In the latter instance, the insurgents occupied parts of Recife and Olinda until they were suppressed by government reinforcements from Alagoas and Paraíba. The toll was between seventy and one hundred dead, and the battalion was transferred to Natal. Relations between the Pernambuco government and Vargas deteriorated. The unrest in Recife during the 1935 Communist Uprising, the virtual military occupation that followed, and the 1937 Estado Novo coup politically neutralized the state government.
