= Flag of Paraíba =

Flag of the Brazilian state of Paraíba

The flag of Paraíba is the official flag of the Brazilian state of Paraíba. The initial version of the modern day flag was first adopted on 25 September 1930 by State law no. 704.

== History ==
=== Pernambucan revolt (1817) ===
On 1 April 1817, the Provisional Government of the state of Paraíba do Norte (Note: The state was also known by its name as a province, Paraíba.) declared a new flag to represent itself alongside the state of Pernambuco. While both states were by law provinces of the United Kingdom of Portugal, Brazil and the Algarves, being the province of Paraíba and Pernambuco, they along with the province of Rio Grande were embroiled in the Pernambucan revolt and seeking to form an independent republic. This new flag was based on the flag of the Pernambucan revolt but without the blue stripe.

Some of the flags used by the Pernambucan revolt had three stars to represent the three members of the revolt: the provinces of Pernambuco, Paraíba and Rio Grande. While seeking recognition from the United States government, the revolutionary Antônio Gonçalves da Cruz presented a flag with three stars that he said represented the three provinces. Cruz also said that stars would continue to be added as more provinces joined the revolutionary cause.

Flag used by Paraíba to represent itself during the Pernambucan revolt (1817)

Flag of the Pernambucan revolt (1817)

=== First official flag (1907–1922) ===
The first official flag of Paraíba was adopted on 21 September 1907 by State law no. 266 during the governorship of Valfredo Leal. It was renounced on 7 November 1922 by State Law no. 553 during the governorship of Sólon de Lucena in the wake of a political movement born in the state of Paraná that promoted abandoning state symbols in favor of national ones.

Official flag of Paraíba (1907–1922)

=== Modern flag (1930) ===
The modern flag was adopted on 25 September 1930 by State law no. 704 to honor João Pessoa, the governor of Paraíba and then running mate of Getúlio Vargas, who was murdered by João Dantas. Getúlio Vargas and João Pessoa, natives of Rio Grande do Sul and Paraíba respectively, were part of the Liberal Alliance, which was a political alliance formed between the two states and Minas Gerais to run against the presidential nominee Júlio Prestes after he was nominated by Brazilian president Washington Luís as his successor. As both men were natives of the state of São Paulo, this went against the established practice of Milk coffee politics that saw the presidency largely alternate between São Paulo and Minas Gerais.

Initial version of the modern day flag of Paraíba

The modern flag was officially used until the Brazilian Constitution of 1937 abolished the usage of all municipal and state symbols in favor of national ones. The state flag of Paraíba was only reinstituted by article 137 of the 1947 State Constitution of Paraíba and formally adopted on 30 August 1967 by State law no. 3489. (Note: One source says that the flag was reinstated on 26 July 1965 by Decree no. 3919.)

The word négo on the flag was changed to be written as nego after the Spelling Reform of 1971.

== Symbolism ==
The word nego on the flag is the first person present tense of the Portuguese word negar (to refuse) and was said by João Pessoa when he refused to support the practice of Milk coffee politics and the candidacy of Júlio Prestes. It may literally be translated into English as "I deny it" or "I refuse it". The red represents João Pessoa's blood and the black represents the struggle of the people of Paraíba after his murder. Red and black were also the colors of the Liberal Alliance.
