= Brazilian Revolution of 1930 in Pará =

Revolution of 1930 in Pará
- Part of the Revolution of 1930
- The State Public Force (transformed into the Civil Guard after the revolution), which fought on the loyalist side
| Date | 3–24 October 1930 (fighting on 5–6 October) |
| Location | Belém and the coast of Pará, Brazil |
| Result | Revolutionary victory: Legalist military victory in Pará territory; Transfer of power following the fall of the federal government |

Belligerents
| Revolutionaries; Brazilian Army; Cvilian volunteers | Loyalists; Public Force of Pará; Brazilian Army; Brazilian Navy |

Commanders and leaders
| Castilhos França; Abel Chermont; Ismaelino de Castro | Eurico Vale; Artur Coelho de Souza |

Strength
| +300 men in the Army | 811 in the Public Force |

In Pará, the Revolution of 1930 ousted the administration of Eurico de Freitas Vale and brought the Tenentist military officer Magalhães Barata to power. Between 5 and 6 October, Eurico Vale—the state's last representative of the First Republic—managed to defeat an uprising by the Army's 26th Light Infantry Battalion (26th BC), thanks to the loyalty of his Public Force. The transfer of power did not occur until 24 October, following the federal government's ouster in a military coup in Rio de Janeiro.

Although Eurico Vale's administration was well-regarded, the political system was already discredited and a financial crisis was already entrenched by the time he took office. A very similar Tenentist revolt had previously occurred within the 26th BC in 1924, and conspiracies for a nationwide armed movement found allies in Pará, such as Magalhães Barata and the journalist Abel Chermont. Barata was arrested by the police in August, yet the conspiracy persisted. On 3 October—the movement's scheduled start date nationwide—authorities thwarted a plot to seize ammunition from the Barra Fort. It was not until the night of the 5th that the rebels succeeded in inciting the 26th BC to mutiny.

The uprising was doomed by the loss of the element of surprise, the accidental death of the revolt's leader—Navy officer Eurico de Castilhos França—and numerical inferiority, which was exacerbated by splitting forces across multiple simultaneous attacks. On the morning of the 6th, following failed assaults on the Government Palace and the 8th Military Region Headquarters, the rebels seized the railway to Bragança, intending to link up with their comrades in Maranhão. The journey was long and arduous, and very few reached the destination. The leader, Army Lieutenant Ismaelino de Castro, was arrested in Viseu on the 19th.

Loyalist forces reinforced Belém and imposed press censorship, yet news of revolutionary victories in other states—including Maranhão—still reached the public. Within revolutionary territory, Landri Sales's "Northern Brigade" was preparing an expedition to capture Pará, but the battle was averted by the establishment of a military junta in Rio de Janeiro on 24 October. Following a brief transition, Magalhães Barata rose to power; he would go on to become the dominant figure in Pará's politics for years to come.

== Background ==
=== Local political landscape ===
In the years leading up to the Revolution of 1930, Pará was in a state of intermittent crisis due to falling prices for rubber—the cornerstone of its export-oriented economy. Debts seemed inescapable. Livestock farming, agriculture, and industry were underdeveloped, and the aviamento system—prevalent in the extractive economy—kept small producers in a state of deep dependency. Public services were dwindling due to a lack of resources. Politically, practices were typical of the First Republic: dominant oligarchies perpetuated their rule through persecution and electoral fraud. Dissatisfied sectors—particularly the urban middle classes, who were being pushed into poverty, and segments of the elite excluded from power—looked to the military for a political alternative. Their revolutionary ideal was essentially liberal.

In military terms, Belém was home to the Army's 26th Light Infantry Battalion (26th BC). The states of Pará, Amazonas, Maranhão, and Piauí made up the 8th Military Region (8.ª RM). According to a report by the regional commander, the officer corps in the Belém and Manaus battalions consisted "almost entirely [...] of officers inconveniently transferred to the Amazon—deemed undesirable elsewhere in the country—who arrived rife with subversive ideas." Consequently, in July 1924—concurrent with Tenentist revolts in São Paulo, Amazonas, and other garrisons—the 26th BC rose up in rebellion but was defeated by the Public Force. The Óbidos Fort, in the interior of Pará, sided with the rebel military forces from Amazonas; however, the latter were dispersed following the arrival of federal reinforcements. The Public Force's ability to defeat the federal garrison is also characteristic of the First Republic, a period when such institutions functioned as "state armies."

The governor elected for the 1929–1933 term was Eurico de Freitas Vale, considered a prudent and tolerant leader who eschewed violence against the opposition. However, his positive image was not enough to save the political system from disrepute. Acceptance of the Eurico Vale administration coexisted with a desire for change at the national level. A key advocate for what would become the Revolution of 1930—which brought the First Republic to an end—was the journalist Abel Chermont, director of the opposition newspaper O Estado do Pará. Paulo Maranhão's Folha do Norte had opposed previous administrations but now supported Eurico Vale.

=== Local conspiracies ===
Most state governments, including that of Pará, aligned themselves with the federal government of President Washington Luís to support Júlio Prestes' bid in the 1930 presidential election. It was rumored that Eurico Vale might be appointed a minister in Júlio Prestes' cabinet, possibly at the Ministry of Finance. The flawed electoral process of the First Republic resulted in a victory for the pro-government candidate. Even before the election, the opposition candidate and Governor of Rio Grande do Sul, Getúlio Vargas, initiated contact with revolutionary military figures—whether imprisoned or in exile—aiming to launch an armed movement against the government. Beyond the military, the conspiracy extended to prominent politicians. In the country's North and Northeast, the revolutionary military leader was Captain Juarez Távora.

In Pará, the leader of the conspiracy was Abel Chermont. Other civilian conspirators included Abelardo Conduru and Father Leandro Pinheiro. Within the Army, the conspirators included Lieutenants Osmar Pacheco Dilon, Mário Machado, Emanuel de Almeida Morais, Ismaelino Sarmento de Castro, and Luís Geolás de Moura Carvalho. In the Amazon Flotilla, Navy officers Eurico de Castilhos França, Álvaro Cabo, and Rogério Coimbra were among the conspirators. The movement's military leader was to be Magalhães Barata, an officer from Pará and a veteran of the 1924 movement in Amazonas.

Barata had been living in exile in Uruguay until he returned to Brazil via Rio Grande do Sul a few months before the revolution. According to the journalist and conspirator from Maranhão, José Maria dos Reis Perdigão, Barata traveled from Fortaleza to Belém using the false identity of a pharmaceutical representative from Paramaribo—an alias provided by the physician Fernandes Távora, Juarez's uncle. Távora sent a telegram to Chermont reading: "Package arriving by plane." Police in Pará grew suspicious and nearly captured the officer at the port. A few days later, on 21 August, Reis Perdigão visited Chermont at the Beneficência Portuguesa Hospital, where the latter had been admitted to facilitate his conspiratorial activities. Based at the Belém Cathedral—under the protection of Father Clotário de Alencar—Magalhães Barata set about organizing the uprising. When the police discovered his hideout, he disguised himself as a priest and moved to the chapel of the Juliano Moreira Hospital, where Leandro Pinheiro served as chaplain. The police located this new refuge (Note: Sources differ regarding the circumstances of the arrest: in the ceiling of a church or at Leandro Pinheiro's house.) and sent the arrested officer to Rio de Janeiro. In his place, the military faction selected Navy officer Eurico de Castilhos França to lead the movement.

== Revolt of the 26th BC ==
The revolution began on a national scale on 3 October. The Chief of Staff of the 8th Military Region declared to the press that the situation across the country was normal, yet the police chief, Augusto Borborema, ordered routine security measures. The Public Force was placed on alert. During the night of 3–4 October, the police thwarted an attempt by a group of conspirators to divert five tons of rifle ammunition from the Barra Fort to Curro Velho. The revolutionaries lost the element of surprise as well as the ammunition intended for the 26th Light Infantry Battalion (26th BC). Police arrested several suspected civilians and military personnel, including Abel Chermont, his brother Mário, and Leandro Pinheiro.

The uprising stood no chance of success, yet it was launched—according to Ismaelino de Castro—solely to honor commitments made to fellow revolutionaries in the Northeast and South. The conspirators planned to mobilize the 26th Infantry Battalion and split their forces to attack the Government Palace, the 8th Military Region Headquarters, and police barracks; in the event of failure, they intended to seize the railway to Bragança, join allies in Maranhão, and return to Belém with reinforcements. This was the same combat strategy employed in 1924, the only difference being the prospect of support from other states. The planning was flawed, and the execution was plagued by one failure after another. The initial error lay in the division of troops—dispersing forces for simultaneous attacks—whereas a concentrated force would have stood a better chance.

The loyalists held a numerical advantage: 811 Public Force troops against just over three hundred soldiers from the 26th Infantry Battalion. The Public Force—organized into a mixed group, a cavalry squadron, and an infantry battalion, and reinforced by the Municipal Fire Corps—was well-armed and had a reputation for prevailing in similar situations.

The revolt in Belém began around 21:00 on 5 October, more than 48 hours behind the other states. In the initial moments, Lieutenant-Commander Castilhos França was killed at the barracks entrance—shot by a sentry—as he arrived accompanied by other leaders. (Note: The shot ricocheted off the pavement and fatally wounded Castilhos França in the abdomen. There are several versions regarding the cause of death: the sentry allegedly mistook the officers for intruders, or fired to cheer or to alert the personnel inside the barracks.) Stunned, the revolutionaries chose Lieutenant Ismaelino de Castro as their new leader. Lieutenant Colonel Joaquim Francisco Duarte and Captain Sant'Anna de Medeiros—the battalion commander and an officer, respectively—were arrested upon arrival. The rest of the officer corps had joined the rebellion. Following the first signs of the Army revolt, Lieutenant-Commander Coimbra went to the Naval Arsenal. The plan was to seize the naval unit and arrest Captain Emanuel Braga—the Naval Arsenal inspector and Flotilla commander—as well as Lieutenant-Commander Jayme Barreto. Neither officer was present, so Coimbra rejoined his Army comrades. Commander Braga would later arrive at the base and organize a defense. The total force consisted of eighty men.

A country house on Tito Franco Avenue was set on fire to divert the attention of government forces, but the few firefighters sent to extinguish the blaze returned in time to defend the government. At 21:30, shots fired from inside the barracks sparked panic in Justo Chermont Square, and news of the uprising spread throughout the city. A woman was wounded, and a streetcar operator was killed after refusing an order to stop. Patrols fanned out across the square. According to Folha do Norte, some civilians were arrested and forced to join the movement, though there was also spontaneous participation by Pará Electric employees and dockworkers. From 23:00 until 03:00, there was absolute silence, followed by a burst of gunfire that woke Belém.

=== Battles in Belém ===
Colonel Artur Coelho de Souza, commander of the 8th Military Region

The rebels split into two groups: the main body of troops advanced via Nazaré, São Jerônimo, São Brás, Benjamin Constant, Boaventura da Silva, and Ruy Barbosa avenues toward Praça da República, aiming for simultaneous attacks on the Army Headquarters and the Government Palace in the city center. Another contingent headed to 22 de Junho Street to attack the Public Force Cavalry Squadron barracks. Loyalist forces took up defensive positions in Praça da República and at the entrances to the converging avenues.

At the Government Palace (and the adjacent Public Force Mixed Group), there were five separate attacks, ranging from before 02:30 to the final, heaviest assault at 06:20. Grenades and bombs were thrown from a two-story house on Travessa Tomázia Perdigão. At the Army Headquarters, three consecutive attacks were launched against the rear and flanks. Loyalist Army officers and sergeants fought to defend the position, which served as the base of operations for the Military Region commander, Colonel Artur Coelho de Souza. The Public Force Infantry Battalion was initially cut off from other loyalist forces and came under heavy attack on its left flank, where it held positions along 15 de Agosto and Ferreira Pena avenues. The loyalist troops, commanded by Lieutenant Colonel Manuel Antônio do Nascimento, were equipped with machine guns and had constructed trenches using cobblestones and sandbags. The troops did not sleep on Sunday night; any rest taken occurred at their combat positions. The attack on the Cavalry Squadron proved ineffective: shots were fired from such a distance that the loyalist commander, Major Marcolino Aguiar, chose not to return fire. The attackers fell silent so as not to waste their scarce ammunition.

Officers and sergeants of the Municipal Fire Department (Loyalist), commanded by Colonel Anastácio Sampaio

The press reported indiscriminate firing by rogue groups of soldiers, particularly in Praça da República and along General Gurjão, Padre Prudêncio, and Lauro Sodré streets. There was even an apparent attempt to release prisoners from the São José jail. Shots were fired at the governor's residence in Praça da Trindade, where his family was present; the target held no military value. A civilian and a police officer were wounded. Three soldiers occupied the Basilica tower. Among the loyalist forces, the Fire Department handled the treatment of the wounded.

After seeing all their attacks repelled, the revolutionaries initiated a plan to retreat to Bragança. At 07:00 on 6 October, a platoon from the 26th BC—commanded by Lieutenant Olímpio Pinto Pampolha, the only Public Force officer to join the movement—headed to the São Brás station of the Bragança Railway. The rebels cut communication lines and forced staff to prepare two trains for troop transport. As the train drivers had fled, the greasers were coerced into operating the locomotives. During the final stage of the fighting, some soldiers from the battalion defected to the loyalist side. Others were arrested before they could join the retreat. That same morning, the Public Force reoccupied the battalion's barracks.

=== Retreat to Maranhão ===
The retreat was more of a rout than a disciplined military operation. At stations along the railway, the Folha do Norte reported the disabling of telephone and telegraph equipment, gunfire, drunkenness, the smashing of devices, the conscription of civilians, damage to local businesses, and attempts to requisition money. The troops disembarked in Bragança at 09:30 on 7 October. They disabled telegraphs, requisitioned goods and horses, released prisoners from the public jail, destroyed archives, and burned a portrait of Washington Luís at city hall. By late afternoon, they had left the city, heading toward Maranhão. Port authority officials and the local judge withdrew from the city until the revolutionaries had departed.

The revolutionaries split into two columns: about 230 men proceeded overland, while fourteen—led by Lieutenant-Commander Coimbra—traveled to Viseu in a sailing canoe, transporting ammunition. Reaching São Luís, the capital of Maranhão, from Bragança was extremely difficult under those conditions. The troops lacked logistical support; their medical service consisted of a single medical student detained in Belém; and the government had banned steamships from docking along the coast in the Salgado Paraense region. Unsurprisingly, there were many desertions, beginning on the railway line and increasing after Bragança.

Viseu, located on the banks of the Gurupi River on the border with Maranhão, was the last destination offering any sort of resources. From that point on, there lay a long trek (Note: Seventy leagues to Engenho Central or fifty leagues to "the locality with the easiest access to São Luiz do Maranhão". An account attests that some conspirators reached Turiaçu, in Maranhão.) along the telegraph line to the next destination—Engenho Central—where water transport would be available. The region was swampy and inhospitable, and the only settlement was Maracaçumé. Eight soldiers remained in Viseu on patrol duty, while Ismaelino de Castro ventured into Maranhão with the rest. According to his account, he had not expected the loyalist forces to reach Viseu so quickly; however, a Public Force company led by Captain Antônio de Souza Marreiros soon captured two of the sentries who had been left behind.

Once in Maranhão, Ismaelino de Castro decided to return to Viseu or Bragança in search of supplies. He was accompanied by Sergeant Gonçalo Lago Castelo Branco Leão, the poet Abguar Bastos, and twenty soldiers selected from among his bravest men. Leaving the boat containing the other soldiers behind and without conducting reconnaissance of the town, he approached Viseu at 22:00 on 19 October in a motor launch with a crew of five. At the first sound of a pistol shot, he surrendered to the squad led by Public Force Lieutenant João Evangelista Filho. Following Ismaelino's arrest, the remnants of the troop scattered into isolated, demoralized groups. About thirty men—including Emanuel de Almeida Moraes and Lieutenant-Commander Coimbra—managed to reach São Luís in a boat carrying ammunition and military supplies. The prisoners arrived in Belém filthy and in rags. This entire phase of the movement was poorly managed. The rebels would have had better chances had they established themselves in Bragança, where they could have proclaimed a revolutionary government—with access to supplies, shelter, and medicine—and sabotaged the railway line to keep the loyalists at bay.

== State of emergency ==
The counter-move led by Eurico Vale kept him firmly in power. On 7 October, the atmosphere remained tense. Groundless rumors circulated regarding a Navy revolt, sparked by routine maneuvers carried out by lighthouse keeper boat Mário Alves in Guajará Bay and the accidental discharge of a police rifle. By 11:00, rumors were circulating that the military headquarters was about to be attacked. Many civilians headed to Saldanha Marinho Square to witness the assault. Army patrols cordoned off the area and cleared the square. Rifle shots were, in fact, fired toward the headquarters.

With the nationwide state of emergency in effect, the state government imposed media censorship. Lieutenant Dinelly and Police Second Officer Luiz Gomes oversaw telephone censorship, while Dr. Lúcio Mello—the third-ranking municipal official—was assigned as censor for the Folha do Norte newspaper. The federal government claimed to be suppressing the uprising. Authorities seized the 6 October edition of O Estado do Pará, and Father Clotário de Alencar was detained for having sheltered Magalhães Barata; however, on 7 October, the arrest order against the staff of O Estado do Pará was lifted, and the premises—along with all equipment in perfect working order—were returned to the owner and manager, Afonso Chermont. Due to the state of emergency, the newspaper was prohibited from circulating until further notice. The governor's aide-de-camp, Major Oliveira Machado, telephoned the management to offer all necessary assurances. The governor did not abuse the powers granted by the state of emergency: private property was respected, and arrests were promptly revoked. According to accounts, conditions in detention were decent. In addition to journalists, many ordinary people had been arrested on charges of spreading rumors.

News of revolutionary victories in the rest of the country arrived via private radios, which were immune to censorship. An official government statement released on the 8th condemned the "alarmist rumors criminally spread" and announced that "in Minas Gerais and Rio Grande do Sul, federal forces are fighting heroically against local police units." On 11 October—the eve of the Círio de Nazaré festival—the former governor of Maranhão, José Pires Sexto; the former mayor of São Luís, Basílio Franco de Sá; and the former commander of the Maranhão Public Force, Colonel José Bandeira de Melo, arrived in Belém aboard the ship Itapecuru. Folha do Norte published the account of the former mayor of São Luís, in which he described the Army uprising in the city and the revolutionaries' ousting of the Maranhão government. The official narrative collapsed.

== War preparations ==
The Military Region commander expelled from the Army all sergeants, corporals, and soldiers of the 26th BC involved in the movement—totaling around three hundred expulsions. To replenish the depleted garrison, reservists and recruits were called up in large numbers, forming a new unit: the 46th BC. By 22 October, its strength had reached four hundred men, and it was in the process of final organization. That same day, the 27th BC arrived from Manaus, having been transferred to Belém by order of high-ranking Army authorities. Two days earlier, the 4th Artillery Battalion from Óbidos had disembarked. The Military Region commander also moved to incorporate the Public Force into the Federal Army, granting its personnel the privileges and pay of federal troops. Finally, on 24 October, the last loyalist reinforcement arrived at the Belém docks: the ship Pará, serving as an auxiliary cruiser (in reality, an armed merchant vessel). On board was Senator Magalhães de Almeida (from Maranhão), who planned to invade São Luís with three thousand men from the public forces of Amazonas and Pará.

To aid the revolutionaries in Pará, Juarez Távora appointed Lieutenant Colonel Landri Sales to command the Northern Brigade. This force comprised about two thousand men, including a contingent from the 23rd BC (from Fortaleza), police officers, and volunteers. On 18 October, it set sail from Fortaleza aboard the ships Afonso Pena, Tutóia, and Itapena. It picked up further reinforcements in Maranhão. The expedition's vanguard was to consist of motorboats and tugs, led by the tug Nero. The landing was to take place at Bragança or Quatipuru. However, the national victory of the revolution preceded the planned offensive against Belém.

== Transfer of Power ==
On 24 October, rumors spread regarding a military coup and the installation of a governing junta in Rio de Janeiro. The lack of official confirmation—which would not arrive until 21:00—cast doubt on their veracity. Nevertheless, crowds took to the streets, raising the red flag of the revolution. Speakers delivered addresses in support of the Liberal Alliance. Business owners feared vandalism. Eurico Vale ordered the Public Force not to antagonize the population. The Navy released Álvaro do Cabo, and at 16:00, a crowd headed to the Government Palace to demand the release of the other prisoners.

The governor received the demonstration's leaders, Eduardo and Guilherme Chermont. He informed them that a telegram from Maranhão had ordered him to step down, but that he would await instructions from Rio de Janeiro before releasing the prisoners. After receiving a telegram from Rio de Janeiro, he ordered government troops to return to their barracks, released the prisoners, and summoned them to the palace, where he delivered a speech defending his administration's achievements. At 20:00, he handed over the government to a junta composed of Ismaelino de Castro, Álvaro do Cabo, and Abel Chermont. As he descended the palace steps accompanied by the members of the junta, the crowd applauded.

Following the dissolution of the National Congress by the junta in Rio, the State Congress was also dissolved. On 26 October, Landri Sales arrived in Belém with his brigade to maintain order on behalf of the new regime. Part of his contingent was sent to Amazonas. Landri Sales governed for only two days and handed over the government to another junta composed of Ismaelino de Castro, Mário Chermont, and Rogério Coimbra. On 12 November, Juarez Távora arrived in Belém to install Magalhães Barata as federal interventor. Juarez opposed Barata's appointment, but the choice prevailed due to the decision of Pará's revolutionary leaders.

== Consequences ==
From then on, politics in Pará would be divided between Barata and anti-Barata factions. There was no policy of retaliation against the revolution's enemies; according to Abel Chermont, "half of Belém's population is related to the other half. If we ordered the execution of political enemies, we would be obliged to attend the funerals and all go into mourning." However, the newspapers associated with the old regime—Folha do Norte and O Imperial—were shut down, while O Estado do Pará resumed publication on the 28th, becoming an organ of the revolution. Folha do Norte, meanwhile, returned as a mouthpiece for the opposition and a target of persecution by the Barata administration.

By decree, the junta reduced the size of the Public Force, deeming it to have "a troop strength entirely useless for its intended purpose, serving as nothing more than a Praetorian Guard for the government, with no practical aim other than guaranteeing the fictitious stability of authorities who had lost the public's trust." On 22 November, Magalhães Barata abolished the institution. The force was revived in 1932.

There were no significant changes to Pará's socioeconomic structure during the 1930s. The Barata administration's innovation lay in its charismatic and authoritarian style of governance, which would eventually fracture the bloc of "historic" revolutionaries from 1930. During the Constitutionalist Revolution of 1932, he had to contend with uprisings in Óbidos and Belém. A total of 1,063 combatants from Pará were sent to the conflict's main front in São Paulo. A split within his party during the 1935 Pará Constituent Assembly led to the fall of his government, but he would later return as federal interventor (1943–1945) and as elected governor (1956–1959).
