= Juarez Távora (general) =

Brazilian general and politician (1898–1975)

Army General Juarez Távora
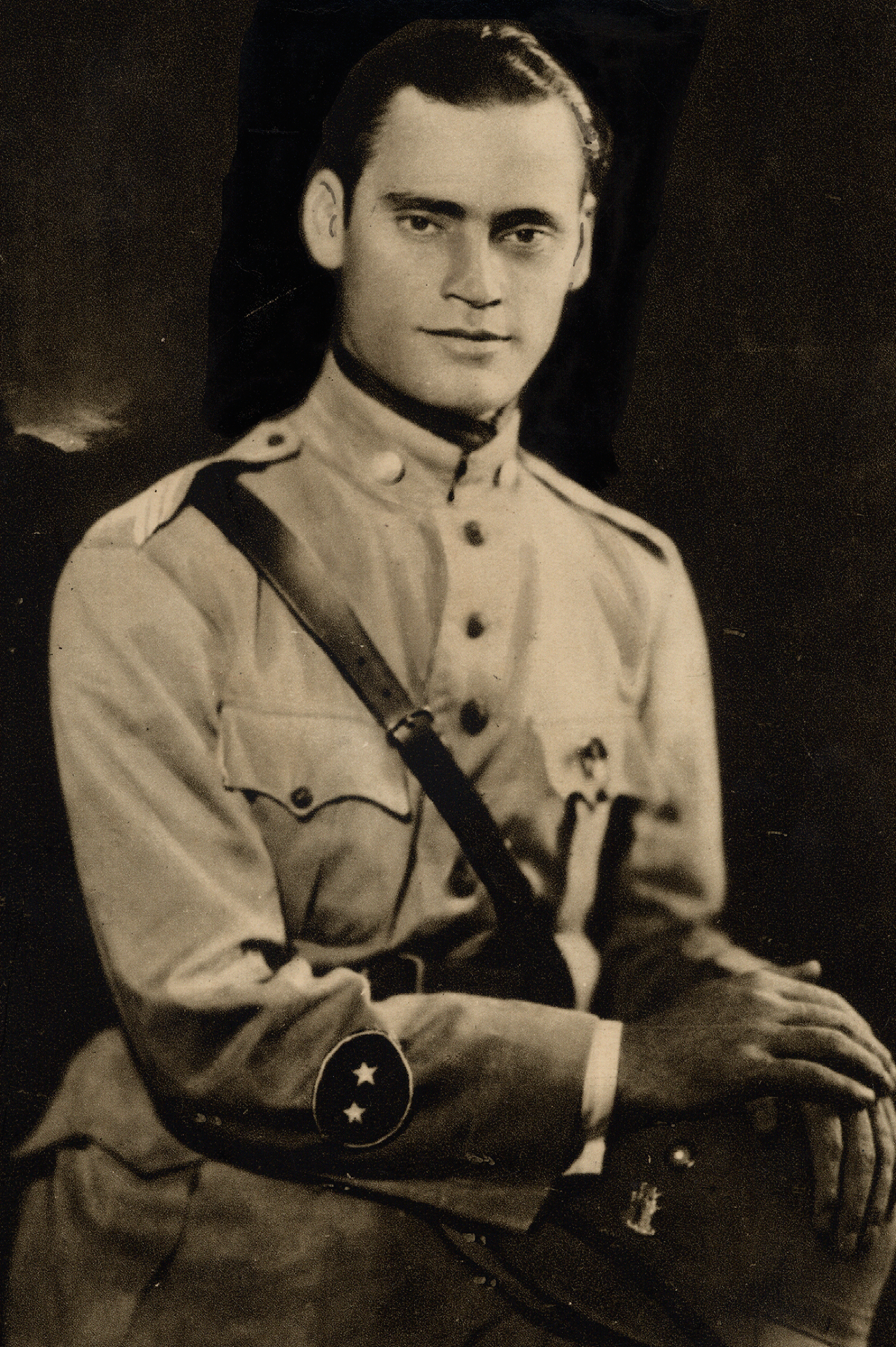

Minister of Transport and Public Works
- In office 15 April 1964 – 15 March 1967
- President: Castelo Branco
- Preceded by: Augusto Rademaker
- Succeeded by: Mário Andreazza
- In office 4 November 1930 – 5 November 1930
- President: Getúlio Vargas
- Preceded by: Vítor Kônder
- Succeeded by: José Américo de Almeida

Chief Minister of the Military Cabinet
- In office 24 August 1954 – 14 April 1955
- President: Café Filho
- Preceded by: Caiado de Castro
- Succeeded by: Bina Machado

Minister of Agriculture
- In office 22 December 1932 – 24 July 1934
- President: Getúlio Vargas
- Preceded by: Assis Brasil
- Succeeded by: Odilon Braga

Member of the Chamber of Deputies
- In office 2 February 1963 – 16 April 1964
- Constituency: Guanabara

Personal details
- Born: 14 January 1898 Jaguaribemirim, Ceará, Brazil
- Died: 18 July 1975 (aged 77) Rio de Janeiro, Rio de Janeiro, Brazil
- Party: Christian Democratic Party
- Other political affiliations: National Democratic Union
- Education: Military School of Realengo
- Occupation: Military officer, politician
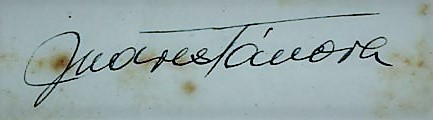
- Signature
- Nickname: Vice-rei do Norte (Viceroy of the North)

Military service
- Allegiance: Brazil
- Branch/service: Brazilian Army
- Years of service: 1916–1975
- Rank: General
- Battles/wars: Copacabana Fort revolt; São Paulo Revolt of 1924; Coluna Prestes; Revolution of 1930; Constitutionalist Revolution

Juarez do Nascimento Fernandes Távora (Jaguaribemirim, (Note: The city is called Jaguaribe nowadays.) 14 January 1898 – Rio de Janeiro, 18 July 1975) was a Brazilian general and politician active during the Revolution of 1930 that put an end to the oligarchic First Brazilian Republic by deposing the president Washington Luís and preventing his elected successor Júlio Prestes from taking office. The revolutionaries handed power over to Getúlio Vargas.

Most active during the revolutionary cycle that swept Brazil from 1922 to 1930, he got to know the country's bowels and its problems by participating in the Coluna Prestes. With this experience, he associated what he saw with the studies of Alberto Torres and Euclides da Cunha, of whom he was an admirer. Hence his deep interest in Brazilian problems and how the State and government should structure themselves to solve them.

He came to be known as the Vice-rei do Norte (Viceroy of the North) during the 1930 Revolution, since he was commander of the troops that took over most of Brazil's northeastern states (at that time these states were referred simply as "the north").

== Early life ==
Távora was the 15th son of Joaquim Antônio do Nascimento and Clara Fernandes Távora do Nascimento, owners of the Embargo farm where Távora was born. His name was suggested by his older brother, Manuel do Nascimento Fernandes Távora, that at the time of his birth studied medicine in Rio de Janeiro and was a great admirer of Mexican president Benito Juárez.

His family, according to biographers, was related to the nobility of Portugal. His maternal uncle, Belisário Távora, also stood out as head of the Federal District's police in the government of president Hermes da Fonseca (1910-1914).

He did his first studies with his mother and at the school of his sister Isabel, in the town of Estreito, from where he later transferred to the school of Professor Cosme Alves da Silva, his cousin, in the town of Caranguejo Novo. Returning to his family's farm in early 1908, he traveled a year later, with his brother Fernando, to Quixadá, where he studied at the boarding school of Instituto Chaves. In May 1911, he went with his brothers Ademar and Fernando to Rio de Janeiro, in order to attend secondary school, which would be paid for by his older brothers Ana Ajuricaba, Manuel and Joaquim. In Rio, they lived in a boarding house while attending the Pedro II School, where they studied until the beginning of 1912. On that occasion, Joaquim Távora, who was an Army officer, was transferred to Rio Grande do Sul to teach Latin at the Military College of Porto Alegre. However, before heading south with Fernando and Juarez, Joaquim interned them for four months at the Asilo do Patrocínio, in Juiz de Fora, so they could finish their secondary education.

== Later years ==
In Porto Alegre, Fernando and Juarez attended, from 1912 to 1914, the Júlio de Castilhos School, an educational institution of the state government. In early 1914, with the extinction of the Latin chair at Military College of Porto Alegre, Joaquim returned to Rio de Janeiro with his two young brothers. In 1915, Juarez and Fernando entered the engineering course at the Polytechnic School of Rio de Janeiro, but were forced to interrupt it at the beginning of their second year, due to financial difficulties. They then decided to transfer to the Military School of Realengo, in the same city. As they attended the Polytechnic School, admission to that military institution was made, in accordance with the law in force at the time, without an admission exam. Thus, in May 1916, in order to obtain the necessary certificate of military training, the two brothers joined the 4th Company of Establishment, in Realengo. In 1917 both joined the Military School, leaving in December 1919 as officer aspirant of military engineering. Promoted to second lieutenant in April of the following year, they started to serve in the 5th Engineering Battalion, in Curitiba, after doing an internship in the 1st Engineering Battalion in Vila Militar.
