= Coronelism =

Brazilian oligarchy of 1889–1930

Coronelism, from the term Coronelismo (Portuguese pronunciation: [koɾoneˈlizmu]), was the Brazilian political machine during the Old Republic (1889–1930), also known as the "rule of the colonels", responsible for the centralization of political power in the hands of a locally dominant oligarch, known as a coronel, who would dispense favors in return for loyalty.

The patron-client political machines of the countryside enabled agrarian oligarchs, especially coffee planters in the dominant state of São Paulo, to dominate state structures to their advantage, particularly the weak central state structures that effectively devolved power to local agrarian oligarchies.

In time, growing trade, commerce, and industry in São Paulo state would serve to undermine the domination of the republic's politics by the São Paulo landed gentry (dominated by the coffee industry) and Minas Gerais (another major coffee producing state, but noted for the size of its dairy industry)—known then by observers as the coffee with milk (café com leite) politics. Under Getúlio Vargas, Brazil moved toward a more centralized state structure that has served to regularize and modernize state governments, moving toward universal suffrage and secret ballots, gradually freeing Brazilian politics from the grips of coronelismo. However, the legacy of the oligarchies is still strongly visible in what is described as Neo-Coronelism or electronic coronelism. Brazilian politics is still known for being highly patrimonial, oligarchic, and personalistic.

== See also ==
- List of Brazilian oligarchs
