= Palácio da Luz =

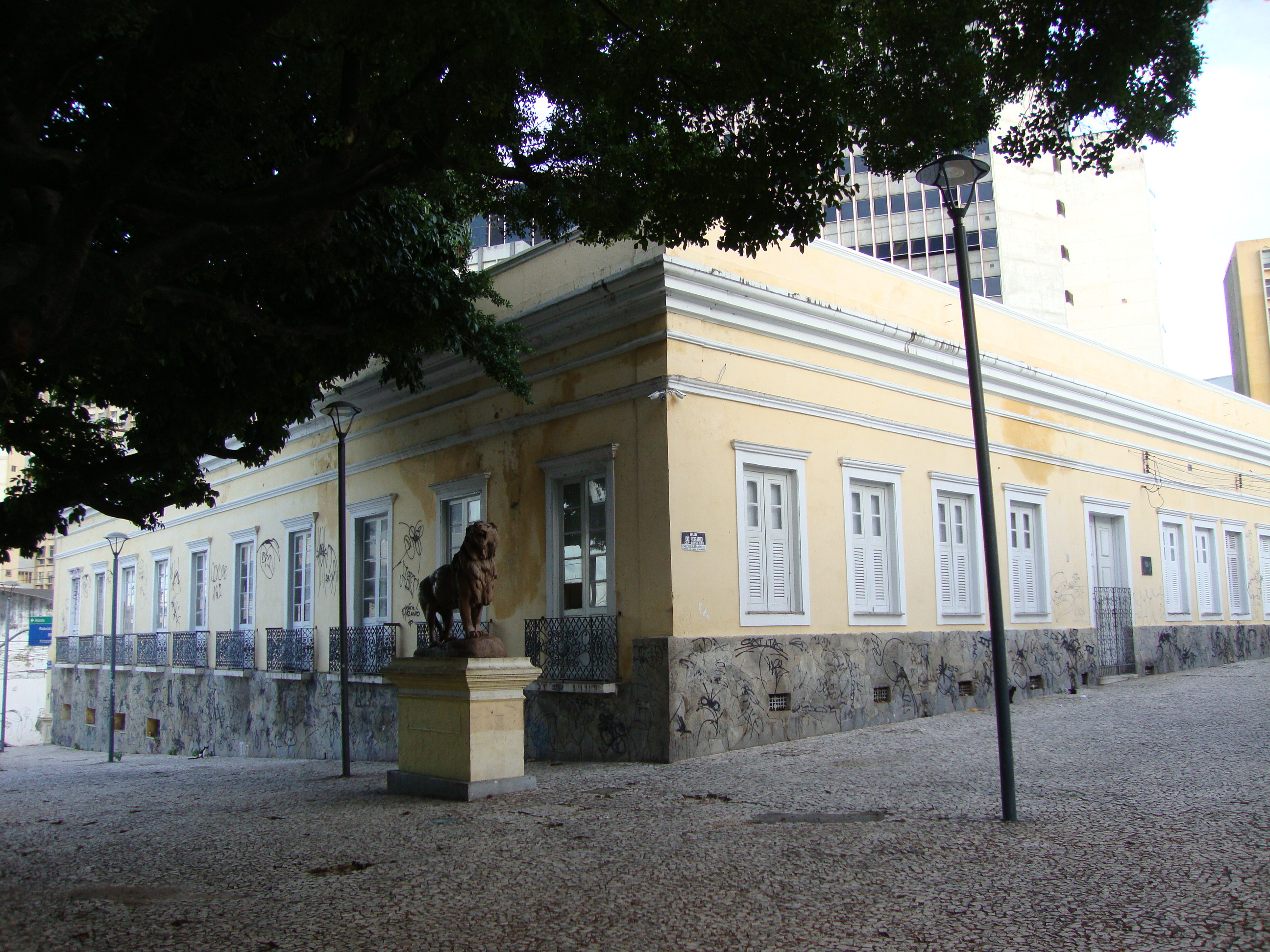
- Palácio da Luz in Fortaleza
- Interactive map of the Palácio da Luz area

General information
- Location: Rua do Rosário 1, Centro, Fortaleza, Brazil
- Coordinates: 3°43′38.28″S 38°31′34.68″W
- Current tenants: Academia Cearense de Letras

Palácio da Luz (Portuguese pronunciation: [paˈlasju dɐ ˈlus]) was the former head office of the government of Ceará state, Brazil. It was built at the end of the 18th century, with the help of indigenous labour, and it was acquired by the Imperial Government in 1814. It now is the headquarters of the Academia Cearense de Letras. It has a library of 15,000 books available for research.

== Protected status ==
The Palácio da Luz was listed as a historic structure by the State of Ceará by directives dated July 30, 1968; November 30, 1983; and November 23, 1992.
