= Carinhanha =

Municipality of Bahia, Brazil

Carinhanha Município de Carinhanha
- Municipality
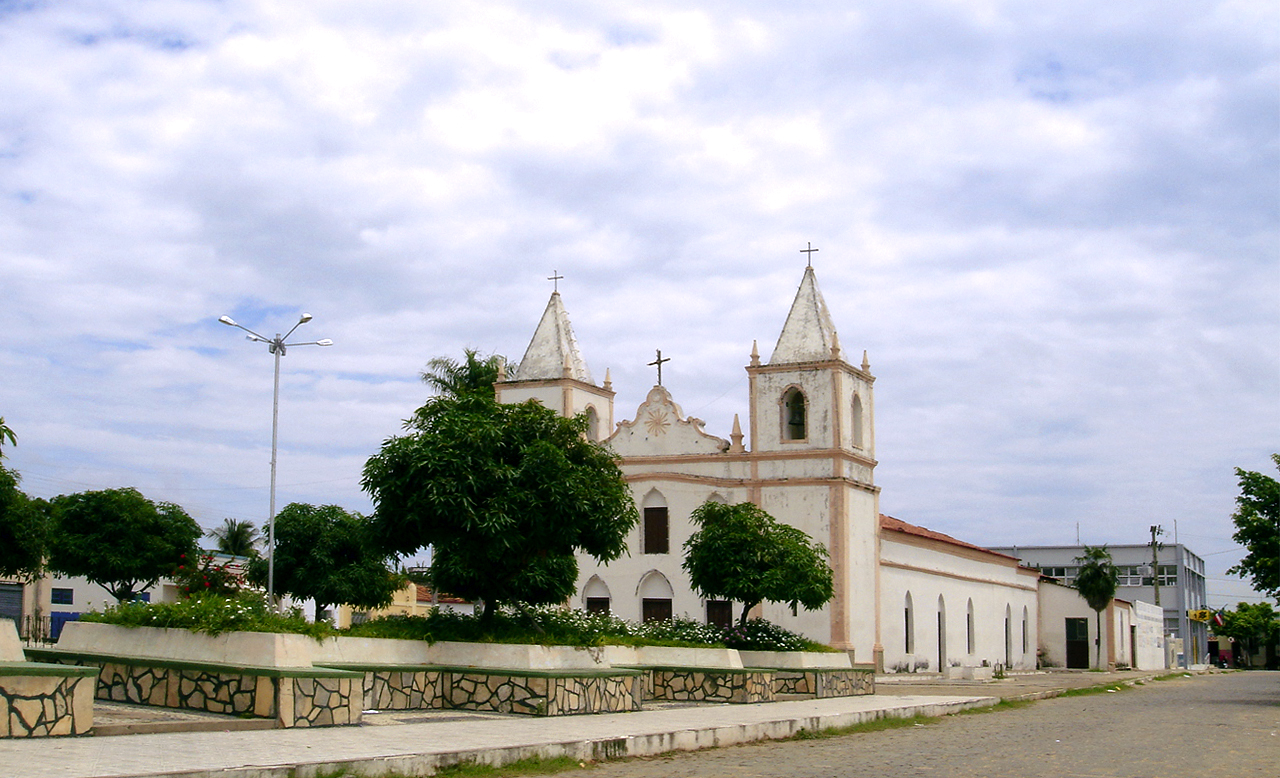
- Carinhanha Square

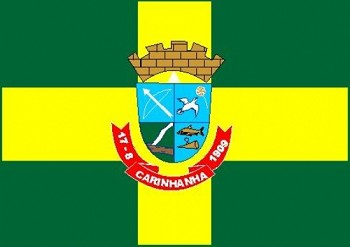
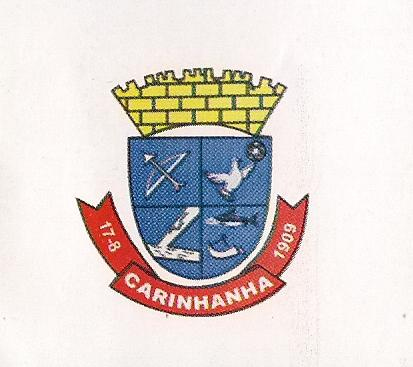
- Flag Coat of arms

- Location of Carinhanha in Bahia

- Location of Carinhanha in the Brazil
- Coordinates: 14°18′18″S 43°45′54″W
- Country: Brazil
- Region: Northeast
- State: Bahia
- Founded: August 17, 1909

Government
  - Mayor: Chica do PT (2025-2028)

Area
  - Total: 2,529.45 km^{2} (976.63 sq mi)
- Elevation: 440 m (1,440 ft)

Population (IBGE/2024)
  - Total: 30,375
  - Density: 12.009/km^{2} (31.102/sq mi)
- Demonym: Carinhanhense
- Time zone: UTC−3 (BRT)
- Postal code: 46445-000
- Website: carinhanha.ba.gov.br

Carinhanha is a municipality in the state of Bahia in the North-East region of Brazil. Carinhanha covers 2,529.45 km^{2} (976.63 mi^{2}), and has a population of 30,375 with a population density of 12 inhabitants per square kilometer. It is located on the banks of the Rio São Francisco and the Carinhanha River, which also forms the border of the state of Minas Gerais.

== Climate ==
Climate data for Carinhanha (1981–2010)
| Month | Jan | Feb | Mar | Apr | May | Jun | Jul | Aug | Sep | Oct | Nov | Dec | Year |
|---|---|---|---|---|---|---|---|---|---|---|---|---|---|
| Mean daily maximum °C (°F) | 32.0 (89.6) | 32.9 (91.2) | 32.1 (89.8) | 32.4 (90.3) | 32.2 (90.0) | 31.1 (88.0) | 30.9 (87.6) | 32.1 (89.8) | 33.9 (93.0) | 34.7 (94.5) | 32.6 (90.7) | 31.6 (88.9) | 32.4 (90.3) |
| Daily mean °C (°F) | 26.1 (79.0) | 26.5 (79.7) | 26.0 (78.8) | 26.0 (78.8) | 25.0 (77.0) | 23.3 (73.9) | 23.2 (73.8) | 24.5 (76.1) | 26.5 (79.7) | 27.9 (82.2) | 26.6 (79.9) | 25.8 (78.4) | 25.6 (78.1) |
| Mean daily minimum °C (°F) | 21.0 (69.8) | 21.1 (70.0) | 20.9 (69.6) | 20.4 (68.7) | 18.1 (64.6) | 16.0 (60.8) | 15.8 (60.4) | 17.1 (62.8) | 19.4 (66.9) | 21.4 (70.5) | 21.6 (70.9) | 21.3 (70.3) | 19.5 (67.1) |
| Average precipitation mm (inches) | 101.8 (4.01) | 105.2 (4.14) | 119.5 (4.70) | 42.2 (1.66) | 5.0 (0.20) | 2.1 (0.08) | 0.4 (0.02) | 0.2 (0.01) | 9.5 (0.37) | 35.3 (1.39) | 145.3 (5.72) | 191.1 (7.52) | 757.6 (29.83) |
| Average precipitation days (≥ 1.0 mm) | 8 | 6 | 8 | 4 | 1 | 0 | 0 | 0 | 1 | 4 | 9 | 11 | 52 |
| Average relative humidity (%) | 66.8 | 64.1 | 67.6 | 61.9 | 55.1 | 52.7 | 49.9 | 45.1 | 44.1 | 45.9 | 61.9 | 68.6 | 57.0 |
| Mean monthly sunshine hours | 253.9 | 238.5 | 248.1 | 258.4 | 278.9 | 275.9 | 291.7 | 308.9 | 281.9 | 260.7 | 201.2 | 211.3 | 3,109.4 |
Source: Instituto Nacional de Meteorologia

== See also ==
- List of municipalities in Bahia
