= Liberal Alliance (Brazil) =

Liberal Alliance Aliança Liberal
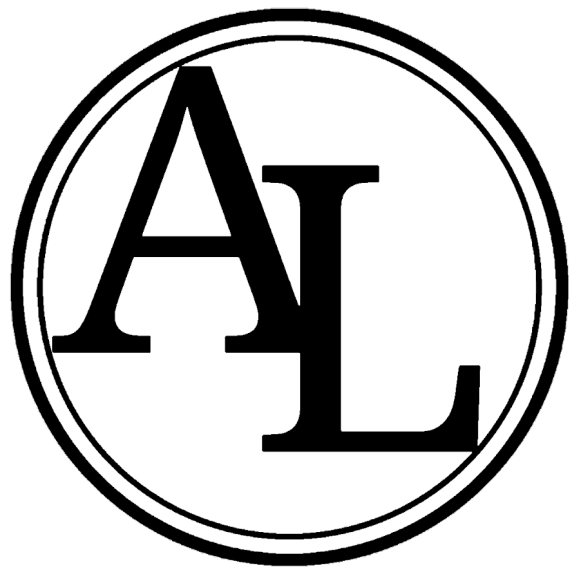
- Leader: Getúlio Vargas; João Pessoa
- Founded: 1929
- Dissolved: 19 March 1930
- Ideology: Nationalism; Liberalism; Anti-Milk coffee politics
- Political position: Centre to centre-right

The Liberal Alliance was a political alliance in Brazil made at the beginning of August 1929 on the initiative of political leaders from Minas Gerais and Rio Grande do Sul to support the candidacies of Getúlio Vargas and João Pessoa for the presidency and vice-presidency in the elections of March 1, 1930, in opposition to Júlio Prestes, the governor of São Paulo and the president Washington Luís.

== History ==
In the elections of March 1, 1930, then president Washington Luís launched the candidacy of Júlio Prestes. His choice aimed to ensure the continuity of the economic and financial policy, of austerity and containment of resources for coffee farming, while representing a break in the traditional relay between São Paulo and Minas Gerais in the presidency. Feeling left out, the candidate from Minas Gerais, Antônio Carlos Ribeiro de Andrada, sought support from Rio Grande do Sul. After intense negotiations between the end of 1928 and July 1929, on July 30, the executive committee of the Republican Party of Minas Gerais launched the candidacies of Getúlio Vargas and João Pessoa for the presidency and vice-presidency, respectively.

The following day, the Liberator Party, from Rio Grande do Sul, joining the Rio-grandense Republican Party in the Gaúcho United Front, gave support for the opposition ticket. Aiming to make its action more concrete, the opposition formed, at the beginning of August, the Liberal Alliance under the leadership of president Minas Gerais Afonso Pena Júnior and vice-president Gaucho Ildefonso Simões Lopes. In addition to Minas Gerais, Rio Grande do Sul and Paraíba, the Liberal Alliance received support from all state oppositions, especially the Democratic Party of São Paulo and the Democratic Party of the Federal District.

On September 20, at a convention held in Rio de Janeiro, the Liberal Alliance approved the Vargas-Pessoa ticket and its electoral platform, written by Lindolfo Collor. Declaring political reform to be essential, he defended popular representation through secret voting, Electoral Justice, the independence of the Judiciary, amnesty for revolutionaries of 1922, 1924 and 1925–27 and the adoption of protectionist economic measures for export products other than coffee. It advocated measures to protect workers, such as the extension of the right to retirement, the application of the vacation law and the regulation of the work of minors and women.

In the same year, a more radical current, formed by young politicians such as João Neves da Fontoura, Oswaldo Aranha and Virgílio de Melo Franco, began to consider an armed movement in the event of defeat at the polls. As a first step, they sought the collaboration of tenentists. These negotiations took place with great difficulty due to mutual distrust, as the Alliance included some of the lieutenants' main adversaries, especially Artur Bernardes, Epitácio Pessoa and João Pessoa.
