= José Américo de Almeida =

Brazilian writer, politician, lawyer and teacher

José Américo
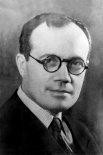

Political offices
- 1954–1956: Governor of Paraíba
- 1951–1953: Governor of Paraíba
- 1930–1930: Governor of Paraíba

Ministerial offices
- 1953–1954: Minister of Transport and Public Works
- 1930–1934: Minister of Transport and Public Works

Parliamentary offices
- 1947–1951: Senator for Paraíba
- 1935–1935: Senator for Paraíba

Legal offices
- 1935–1951: Minister of the Federal Court of Accounts

Personal details
- Born: José Américo de Almeida; 10 January 1887 Areia, Paraíba, Brazil
- Died: 10 March 1980 (aged 93) João Pessoa, Paraíba, Brazil
- Spouse: Ana Alice de Azevedo Melo (m. 1912; died 1962)
- Children: 3
- Parents: Inácio Augusto de Almeida (father); Josefa Leopoldina Leal (mother)
- Education: Faculty of Law of Recife

José Américo de Almeida (January 10, 1887, in Areia – March 10, 1980, in João Pessoa) was a Brazilian writer, a politician, a lawyer and a teacher.

== Bibliography ==
- Reflexões de um Cabra, 1922
- A Paraíba e seus Problemas, 1923
- A Bagaceira, 1928
- O Boqueirão, 1935
- Coiteiros, 1935
- Ocasos de Sangue, 1954
- Discursos de seu Tempo, 1964
- A palavra e o Tempo, 1965
- O Ano do Nego, 1968
- Eu e Eles, 1970
- Quarto Minguante, 1975
- Antes que me Esqueça, 1976
- Sem me Rir, sem Chorar, 1984

Political offices
Preceded by Álvaro Pereira de Carvalho	Governor of Paraíba; 4 October 1930 – 26 November 1930; 31 January 1951 – 19 June 1953; 27 August 1954 – 31 January 1956	Succeeded by Antenor de França Navarro
Preceded by Osvaldo Trigueiro	Governor of Paraíba; 4 October 1930 – 26 November 1930; 31 January 1951 – 19 June 1953; 27 August 1954 – 31 January 1956	Succeeded by João Fernandes de Lima
Preceded by João Fernandes de Lima	Governor of Paraíba; 4 October 1930 – 26 November 1930; 31 January 1951 – 19 June 1953; 27 August 1954 – 31 January 1956	Succeeded by Flávio Ribeiro Coutinho
Ministerial offices
Preceded by Paulo de Morais Barros	Minister of Transport and Public Works; 24 November 1930 – 25 July 1934; 19 June 1953 – 27 August 1954	Succeeded by João Marques dos Reis
Preceded by Álvaro Pereira de Sousa Lima	Minister of Transport and Public Works; 24 November 1930 – 25 July 1934; 19 June 1953 – 27 August 1954	Succeeded by Lucas Lopes
Federal Senate
Preceded by Álcio Souto	Senator for Paraíba; 3 May 1935 – 2 September 1935; 18 March 1947 – 31 January 1951	Succeeded by Duarte Lima
New seat	Senator for Paraíba; 3 May 1935 – 2 September 1935; 18 March 1947 – 31 January 1951	Succeeded by Rui Carneiro
Legal offices
Preceded by Alfredo de Vilhena Valladão	Minister of the Federal Court of Accounts; 31 July 1935 – 11 December 1951	Succeeded by Vergniaud Wanderley
