= João Pessoa (politician) =

Brazilian vice presidential candidate (1930)

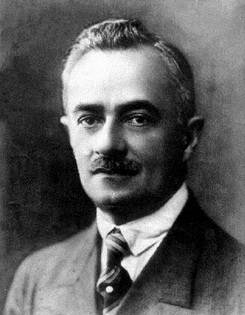

President of Paraíba
- In office 22 October 1928 – 26 July 1930
- Vice President: Álvaro de Carvalho
- Preceded by: João Suassuna
- Succeeded by: Álvaro de Carvalho

Justice of the Superior Military Court
- In office 10 December 1920 – 26 July 1930; Acting: 18 July 1919 – 10 December 1920
- Nominated by: Epitácio Pessoa
- Preceded by: Vicente Neiva
- Succeeded by: Alfredo Prates de Sá

Personal details
- Born: 28 January 1878 Umbuzeiro, Paraíba, Empire of Brazil
- Died: 26 July 1930 (aged 52) Recife, Pernambuco, Brazil
- Party: Paraíba Republican Party
- Spouse: Maria Luísa de Sousa Leão Gonçalves (m. 1905)
- Relations: Epitácio Pessoa (maternal uncle)
- Children: 4
- Parents: Cândido Clementino Cavalcanti de Albuquerque (father); Maria de Lucena Pessoa (mother)
- Education: Faculty of Law of Recife
- Profession: Politician

João Pessoa Cavalcanti de Albuquerque (24 January 1878 – 26 July 1930) was a Brazilian politician and lawyer who served as the governor of Paraíba between 1928 and 1930.

Pessoa was a supporter of Getúlio Vargas and ran as his running mate in the 1930 Brazilian presidential election in opposition to the café com leite system. Pessoa was assassinated shortly after the election which became one of the main causes of the Revolution of 1930.

João Pessoa, the capital and largest city of Paraíba, was renamed in his honor in September of the same year.

== Life and career ==
Pessoa was born on January 24, 1878, at Umbuzeiro, Paraíba, Brazil. He enrolled at the Military Academy of Praia Vermelha in 1895, but dropped out before completing the course. He joined the Faculdade de Direito do Recife (Faculty of Law of Recife) in 1899, graduating in 1904. From 1909, he worked as a lawyer in Rio de Janeiro, in the Ministry of Finance and the Navy. In 1919, Epitácio Pessoa, João Pessoa's uncle, became President of Brazil, and João was made a minister of the Supremo Tribunal Militar (Supreme Military Court).

In 1928, João Pessoa was elected governor of Paraíba, in which role he attempted to bring about reform of the state's political and administrative structure, and imposed taxes on trade conducted between Paraíba and the port of Recife in the state of Pernambuco. In the 1930 presidential elections, Pessoa refused to support the Republican candidate, Júlio Prestes, and accepted an invitation to become the running mate on the ticket of Getúlio Vargas. Prestes won the election, and one of his supporters, Colonel José Pereira Lima, led a revolt against Pessoa's state government, with the cooperation of the federal government. Pessoa responded by ordering raids on the homes and offices of suspected rebel sympathizers; during one such raid on the house of João Duarte Dantas, an ally of Pereira, police discovered intimate letters from Dantas' mistress, which were subsequently published in the state press.

== Death ==
On July 26, 1930, Pessoa was on an official visit to Recife when he was shot and killed by an infuriated Dantas. The assassination stirred up a wave of bad feeling toward the federal government and the outgoing president Washington Luís, who was accused of bearing the "moral responsibility". Not long after Pessoa's death, Washington Luís was overthrown, and Getúlio Vargas installed as president.

== Legacy ==
Parahyba do Norte, the capital and largest city of Paraíba, was renamed João Pessoa in September 1930, two months after his assassination. Pessoa is also commemorated in the Paraíba state flag, which features the word Nego ("I deny"), a reference to Pessoa's refusal to accept Júlio Prestes as president. The colors of the flag, red and black, symbolize the blood shed during the assassination and the period of mourning which followed.
