= Milk coffee politics =

Brazilian politics under the Old Republic

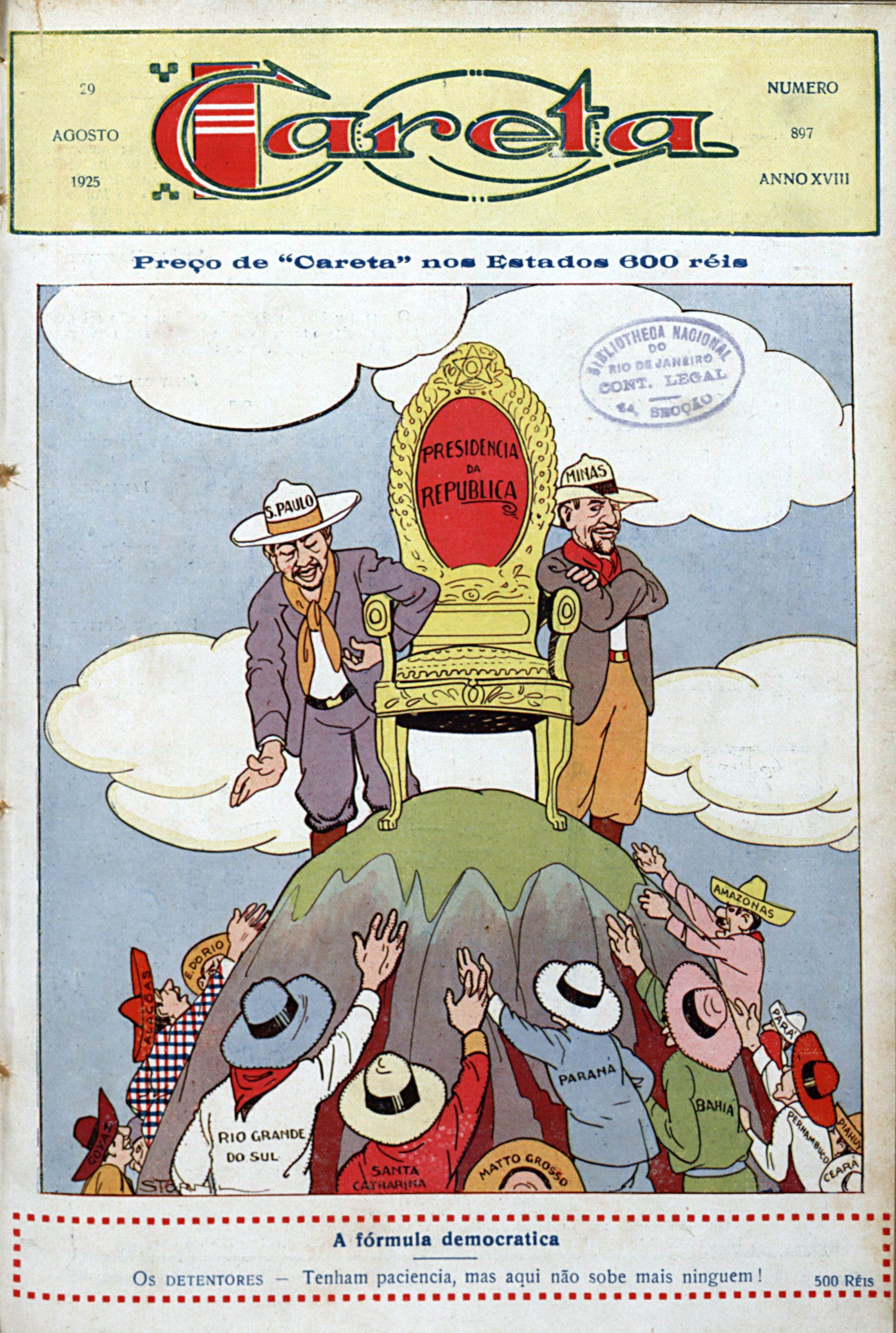
Cartoon on the Careta magazine satyrizing the "Milk coffee politics". Two planters with hats saying "São Paulo" and "Minas Gerais" preventing other states from taking the throne of "Presidency of the Republic"

The states of Minas Gerais and São Paulo

Milk coffee politics or café com leite politics (Portuguese pronunciation: [kaˈfɛ kõ ˈlejtʃi]) is a term that refers to the oligarchic domination of Brazilian politics under the so-called Old Republic (1889–1930) by the landed gentries of São Paulo (dominated by the coffee industry) and Minas Gerais (dominated by the dairy industry), being represented by the Republican Party of São Paulo (PRP) and the Republican Party of Minas Gerais (PRM).

The name alludes to the popular coffee beverage café com leite, (lit. 'coffee with milk'), referring to the states' respectively dominant industries.

== History ==
Under Brazil's Old Republic, the patron-client political machines of the countryside enabled agrarian oligarchs, especially coffee planters in the state of São Paulo, to dominate state structures to their advantage, particularly the weak central state structures that effectively devolved power to local agrarian oligarchies.

Under the Old Republic, the coffee with milk politics rested on the domination of the republic's politics by the states of São Paulo and Minas Gerais — the largest in terms of population and wealth. One can illustrate the extent of that domination by noting that the first presidents of the republic were from São Paulo and thereafter succeeded by an alternation between the outgoing governors of the two leading states in the presidency.

The coffee with milk politics rested on an oligarchic system known as coronelism. Known as the "rule of the colonels", this term referred to the classic boss system under which the control of patronage was centralized in the hands of a locally dominant oligarch known as a "colonel", particularly under Brazil's Old Republic, who would dispense favors in return for loyalty.

Meanwhile, other states resented this grip on the central state by São Paulo and Minas Gerais. The severe drought of 1877 in the Northeast and the ensuing economic collapse — along with the abolition of slavery in 1888 — propelled the mass labor migration of emancipated slaves and other peasants from the Northeast to Southeast, precipitating the decay of established sugar oligarchies of the North. With the concurrent growth of coffee in the Southeast, São Paulo, now emerging as the central state, began to increase in power under the Old Republic. Northeastern landowners bitterly opposed rival oligarchs in São Paulo, explaining their role in the Revolution of 1930.

There were more cases of organized political opposition to the coffee with milk politics before the Revolution of 1930, such as the 1910 presidential election, disputed by Hermes da Fonseca (PRC), supported by Minas Gerais, and Ruy Barbosa (PRP), endorsed by São Paulo by means of the Civilist Campaign; the election of Epitácio Pessoa (PRM) in 1919; and the creation of the Liberator Party (PL) in 1928, in Rio Grande do Sul.

In time, growing trade, commerce, and industry in São Paulo would serve to undermine the domination of the republic's politics by the landed gentries of the same state (dominated by the coffee industry) and Minas Gerais (dominated by dairy interests) — known then by observers as the politics of café com leite. Under Getúlio Vargas, ushered into power by the middle class and agrarian oligarchies of peripheral states resentful of the coffee oligarchs, Brazil moved toward a more centralized state structure that has served to regularize and modernize state governments, moving toward more universal suffrage and secret ballots.
