= Júlio Marcondes Salgado =

Júlio Marcondes César Salgado
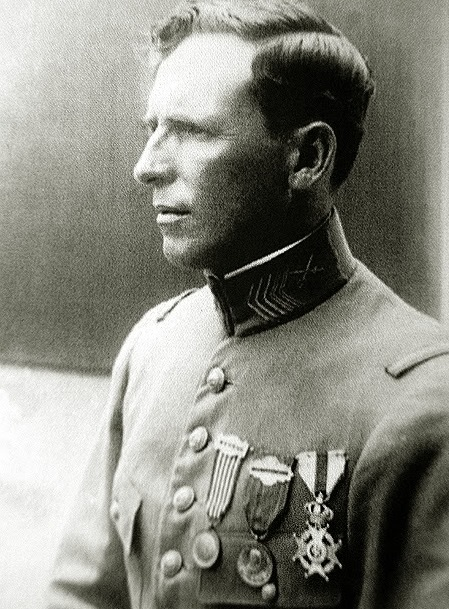
- Salgado, c. 1932
- Born: 1 July 1890; Pindamonhangaba, Brazil
- Died: 23 July 1932 (aged 42); São Paulo, Brazil
- Spouse: Ophélia Acritelli Salgado
- Military career
- Allegiance: Brazil
- Branch: São Paulo State Public Force
- Service years: 1907 – 1932
- Conflicts: Tenente Revolts; São Paulo Revolt of 1924; Prestes Column; Revolution of 1930; Constitutionalist Revolution

Júlio Marcondes César Salgado (1 July 1890 — 23 July 1932) was a Brazilian general and commander of the São Paulo State Public Force, currently the Military Police of the State of São Paulo, during the Constitutionalist Revolution.

== Biography ==
=== Early life ===
Salgado was born on 1 July 1890 in the city of Pindamonhangaba to Victoriano Clementino Salgado and Anna Euphrosina Marcondes do Amaral Salgado. He was the brother of Sérgio, Luiz, Joaquim, Francisco, Euclydia, Francisco Marcondes Salgado and Eneas Marcondes Salgado.

The Marcondes family had a tradition in public and military service. Among the most outstanding people in that family was colonel Manuel Marcondes de Oliveira Melo, the 1st Baron of Pindamonhangaba and commander of the Guard of Honour of Prince Pedro on the occasion of the Grito do Ipiranga (Cry of Ipiranga) that culminated in the independence of Brazil. Another highlight in the Marcondes family was the counselor Francisco Inácio Marcondes Homem de Melo, the first and only Baron of Homem de Melo, who figured in the Imperial era as a minister, president of several provinces and historian.

The Salgado family also had illustrious members of the monarchy and gave São Paulo men such as Antonio Salgado da Silva (the Viscount of Palmeira), Inácio Bicudo de Siqueira Salgado (the Baron of Itapeva) and Benedito Corrêa Salgado, partner of the Baron of Pindamonhangaba in the journey that culminated in the Cry of Ipiranga on the 7th of September.

In the old Jambeiro farm, owned by his parents, the then young Júlio lived his childhood. On the horse "Castanho", his mount, he would go from the farm to Pindamonhangaba, or run through the forests of the farm, later taking part in equestrian competitions at the head of the São Paulo State Public Force.

Salgado learned how to read and write at the Grupo Escolar de Pindamonhangaba. He had already attended the 2nd year when adversity knocked on his door: the death of his mother.

=== Military career ===
On 16 June 1907, at age 16, he enlisted as a simple soldier in the Cavalry Corps of the São Paulo State Public Force. At that institution, he attended the Corporal Alumni Platoon, obtaining his first promotion, the anspeçada, on 1 August 1908.

On 19 May 1911, he was promoted to 2nd sergeant, by merit. In that year he married Ophélia Acritelli, a descendant of a traditional family from Santa Branca.

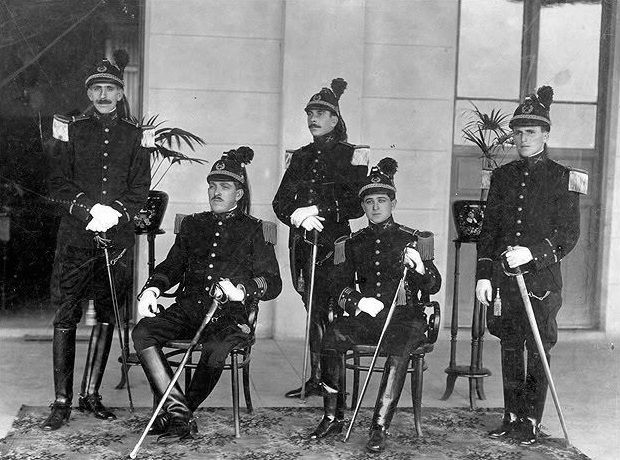
The then ensign Júlio Marcondes Salgado in 1915 (the first one on the right).

On 4 December 1913, aiming for officership, he joined the newly opened School of Officials of the Public Force, graduating in February 1915. That same year, he finally joined the officership of the corporation, as an ensign. In 1916, he was promoted to 2nd lieutenant quartermaster. In 1918 he was promoted to 1st lieutenant, for studies. In 1922, he was awarded the “Knight's Cross of the Order of Leopold II” granted by His Majesty King Albert of Belgium, when visiting the city of São Paulo. The honour was also attributed on that occasion to the then captain of the Cavalry of the Public Force, Azarias Silva, another distinguished officer of cavalry of the corporation.

On 18 March 1924, he was promoted to the rank of captain, by seniority. That same year, he demonstrated his military value, already ostensibly demonstrated in moments of peace, when the 1924 revolt broke out in the capital of São Paulo on July 5, a military insurrection aimed at a coup d'état in the country, starting with the takeover of the state of São Paulo. With deeply legalistic convictions, the then captain took part in the government troops in defense of the State Presidency, then headed by Carlos de Campos. Along with the loyalists to the Legal Government, he assumed several commands during the battle that consecrated him as a true leader.

In 1925, he took part in the assault on the North Station and the Light Plant on the Paula Souza st., that were in control of the insurgents. That same year, in pursuit of the Prestes Column, commanding a company of the 3rd Infantry Battalion, he won the combat in Iacanga, in the west of São Paulo, capturing almost all the enemies. On November 6 of that year, he received the "Medal of Legality" for this feat and was promoted, also for merit and bravery, to major. On 14 May 1927, he was awarded the "Military Medal of Merit" in bronze. On June 1 of the same year, he was promoted to the rank of lieutenant colonel, being classified for the Command of the Cavalry Regiment.

He was an outstanding sportsman, having been São Paulo's champion in polo and fencing, in addition to being a good horseman. On 25 November 1929, he won 1st place in the Brazilian Championship, jumping with the horse Boemio at 1 meter and 85 centimeters high. On 19 January 1930, he received the "Physical Culture Medal".

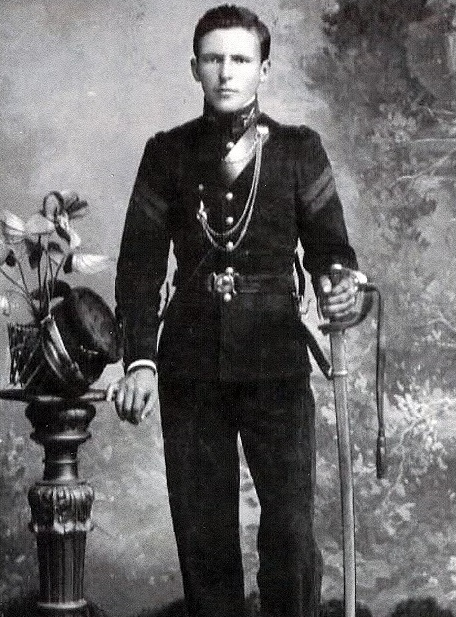
The young officer in the 1920s.

During the Revolution of 1930, at the head of the Cavalry Regiment, he fought the rebels in defence of the State Government. With the deposition in Rio de Janeiro of president Washington Luís, the São Paulo State Public Force surrendered to the revolutionaries, accepting the orders of the Provisional Governing Board of 1930 which, on October 24 of that year, deposed the president and assumed the Head of the Federal Government. Later that day, together with other officers of the corporation, including its commander general, he signed a press release informing the corporation's position in the face of the new political and military situation. Despite having fought the revolution, he remained in positions of trust in the corporation.

On 28 April 1931, he was arrested along with about 200 officers and soldiers from the Army and the Public Force such as José Teófilo Ramos, Antônio Pietscher, Christiano Klingelhoefer, Romão Gomes and Reinaldo Saldanha da Gama, also suffering other disciplinary punishments on account of his participation in a military uprising that took place in São Paulo, later called abrilada. On that date, political leaders linked to the Democratic Party and military personnel from the Public Force and the Army, led by the general commander of the Public Force, colonel Joviniano Brandão, undertook a seditious movement to remove the military intervenor João Alberto Lins de Barros and his secretary of public security, general Miguel Costa. Despite being quickly suffocated, this uprising made evident the political and military crisis established in São Paulo after the 1930 Revolution, as well as the political divide within the Public Force, between Getúlio Vargas' supporters, represented by general Miguel Costa, and his opponents.

In 1931, he commanded the 4th Battalion of Hunters, now headquartered in Bauru. In that year, he also commanded the 5th Battalion of Hunters, now headquartered in Taubaté. By Decree No. 31.766 of 28 June 1990, the 5th Interior Military Police Battalion was named “General Júlio Marcondes Salgado” in his memory.

On 23 May 1932, when Waldemar Ferreira took office as Secretary of Justice and Public Security, his first act was the nomination of Marcondes Salgado for the Interim Command of the State Public Force to the Federal intervenor of São Paulo, Pedro de Toledo. On May 25 he was promoted to colonel and took office on June 17 of that year. He was replaced in command of the Cavalry Regiment by lieutenant colonel Azarias Silva.

He was one of the articulating leaders and military mentor of the Constitutionalist Revolution of 1932. With the outbreak of the armed revolt on 9 July 1932, the then General Commander of the Public Force of São Paulo published the following note to the press:

"PAULISTAS — In the most vibrant manifestation of civility, in the most vigorous proof of love for Brazil and São Paulo, in the most heroic attitude of self-denial and renunciation, at dawn today, the Army, the Public Force and the people of São Paulo launched to the four winds from the pioneer land the cry of revolt for the redeemed Fatherland. In the first sprint, the victory was impressive. All units of the 2nd Military Region of the entire State and cohesive Public Force supported the first impulse of the stupendous youth of Piratininga. Today in São Paulo, supported by arms and by the indomitable will of São Paulo's inhabitants, the claiming idea will no longer be able to suffer the cross-eyed imperatives of a dictatorship of anarchy and discredit for Brazil. The Republic, which was shipwrecked, is, in this blessed hour, saved. Paulistas! Forward! Continue the redemptive crusade! Our blood will not be worth as much as the glory of dying for São Paulo and for Brazil."

=== Death ===
On the morning of 23 July 1932, colonel Júlio Marcondes Salgado died after being mortally wounded in an accident with a prototype mortar during tests, in the Santo Amaro region. In one of the demonstrations, the explosive charge that was supposed to be projected was attached to the launch tube and, with the explosion, the shrapnel hit colonel Salgado, severing his carotid artery. The major of the Public Force José Marcelino da Fonseca was also killed in this accident (one of the creators of the artifact), which also lightly injured general Bertoldo Klinger, then Supreme Commander of the Constitutionalist Army.

His remains were transferred to the Monument and Mausoleum to the Constitutionalist Soldier of 1932, located in São Paulo.

== Homages ==
The Constitutional Governor of São Paulo, Pedro de Toledo, paid him his last tribute, promoting him to the post of General of the Public Force, by Decree No. 5602 of 23 July 23, 1932, on the same date of his death, declaring him as the right champion of the constitutionalization of the country.

The 5th Military Police Battalion of the Interior of the State of São Paulo was renamed to "General Júlio Marcondes Salgado" by Decree No. 31.766 of 28 July 1990, by governor Orestes Quércia. It is considered the “mother unit” of Military Police Organizations headquartered in the Paraíba Valley.

In São Paulo there is the Gen. Júlio Marcondes Salgado Municipal School, in the Parque Edu Chaves district, north zone, and the Gen. Júlio Marcondes Salgado street in the Barra Funda district. In the city of Taubaté there is the "General Marcondes Salgado" race, created in 1985, honoring the commander. In the state, there is also the General Salgado municipality named in his honor.

In Pindamonhangaba, his hometown, he was honored with the name of a street that starts at the Barão do Rio Branco square and ends in the Sant’Ana district. In Taubaté he is also remembered with a square named after him.

== Bibliography ==
- Montenegro, Benedicto (1936). Cruzes Paulistas (in Portuguese). São Paulo: Revista dos Tribunais.
- Marcondes, Athayde (1922). Pindamonhangaba: Através de dois e meio séculos (in Portuguese). São Paulo: Typografia Paulista.
- Ellis Junior, Alfredo (1933). A Nossa Guerra (in Portuguese). São Paulo: Editora Piratininga S.A.
- Serpa, Benito (1962). A Verdun Paulista (in Portuguese). São Paulo: Gráfica Biblos LTDA.
- Tenório, Heliodoro (1933). São Paulo Contra a Dictadura (in Portuguese). São Paulo: Ismael Nogueira.
- Silva, Hélio (1969). 1932 A Guerra Paulista (in Portuguese). São Paulo: Civilização Brasileira.
- Del Picchia, Menotti (1932). A Revolução Paulista (in Portuguese). São Paulo: Revista dos Tribunais.
- Carvalho e Silva, Herculano (1932). A Revolução Constitucionalista (in Portuguese). Rio de Janeiro: Civilização Brasileira.
