= Coronel Aparício Borges =

Neighborhood in Porto Alegre, Brazil

Coordinates: 30°04′37″S 51°10′39″W

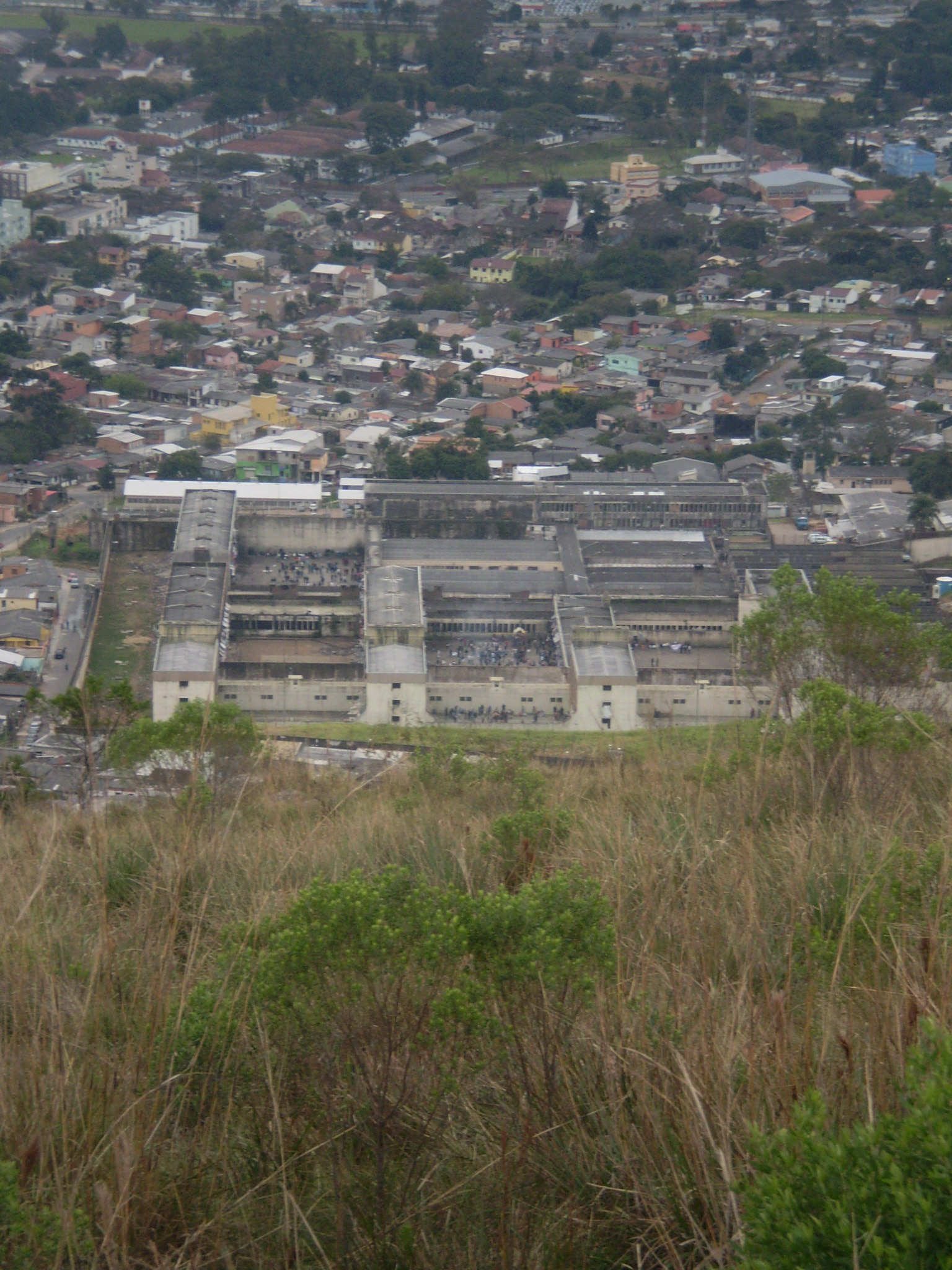
The Central Prison seen from Polícia Hill.

Coronel Aparício Borges is a neighbourhood (bairro) in the city of Porto Alegre, the state capital of Rio Grande do Sul, Brazil. It was created by Law 2022 from December 7, 1959.

The neighbourhood was named after colonel Aparício Borges, who died during the Constitutionalist Revolution in 1932.

The Central Prison of Porto Alegre, considered one of the worst in the country, is located here.
