= Ministry of the Army (Brazil) =

Former government ministry of Brazil

- Ministério do Exército
- Ministry flag

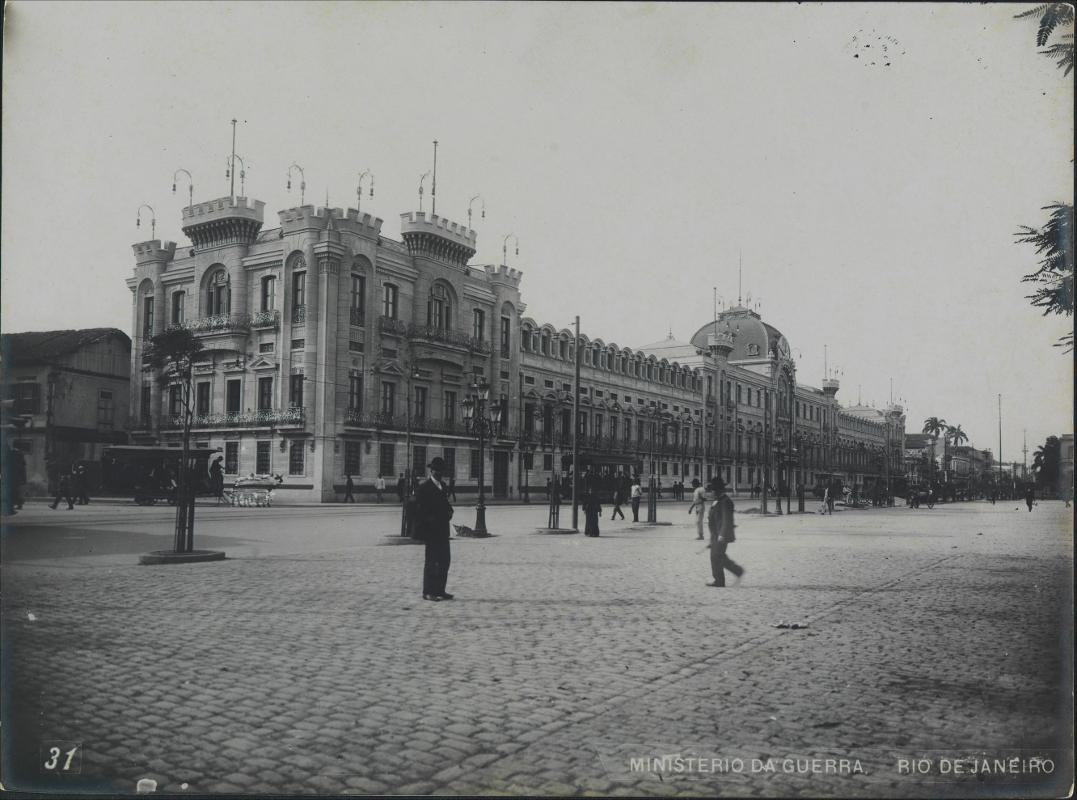
- The headquarters of the Ministry of War in 1914

Ministry overview
- Formed: 22 April 1821
- Dissolved: 9 June 1999
- Superseding agencies: Army High Command; Ministry of Defence
- Type: Ministry
- Jurisdiction: Federal government of Brazil
- Headquarters: Rio de Janeiro (1822–1960) Brasília (1960–1999)

Ministry of the Army (Portuguese: Ministério do Exército), known as the Ministry of War (Portuguese: Ministério da Guerra)) until 1967 was the Brazilian federal government department responsible for managing land-based military affairs, specifically the Brazilian Army. It originated from the Secretariat of State for Foreign Affairs and War, established in Portugal in 1736 and instituted in Rio de Janeiro in 1808 upon the transfer of the Portuguese court to Brazil. It was created on 22 April 1821, later confirmed by a decree of 2 May 1822, as the Secretary of State for War Affairs after the dismemberment of the Secretary of State for Foreign Affairs and War. After the proclamation of the republic in Brazil, it was renamed "Ministry of War" with Law No. 23 of 30 October 1891. and the Ministry of the Army in 1967. It eventually ceasing to exist when the Ministry of Defence was created in 1999. The Ministry of the Army became the current Army High Command, part of the Ministry of Defence's structure.

More than just an administrative reorganization, the creation of the portfolio in 1822 signified the unification of command over land forces, which had previously been dispersed among the viceroys and captains-general of the captaincies. During the existence of the First Brazilian Republic, Pandiá Calógeras was the only civilian to hold the office, serving from 1919 to 1922. Following the creation of the Army General Staff in 1899, it was unclear whether the Chief of the General Staff or the Minister of War held command over the Army. Theoretically, the Minister of War appointed the Chief of the Army General Staff, but in practice, the President of the Republic appointed both. The position of Chief of the EME was primarily technical, whereas the Ministry of War was a political role. Ministers of War viewed themselves as the Army's commanders and sought to centralize decision-making. In 1938, the Estado Novo confirmed the practical command of the Ministry of War, making its Cabinet the Army's principal body. The Army General Staff was relegated to an auxiliary role. During this period, President Getúlio Vargas also placed the Public Forces—formerly "small state armies"—under the Army's authority, bringing them under the control of the Ministry of War.

The Army headquarters—and thus the Ministry of War—had been located at Praça da República in Rio de Janeiro since 1861. The original palace at Campo de Santana, the site of the Proclamation of the Republic, underwent renovation between 1906 and 1910. The Ministry's headquarters moved to the new Duque de Caxias Palace at the same location in 1941, and later to the new capital, Brasília, in 1971.

The Ministry of the Army was organized in 1967 at the onset of the dictatorship's military reorganizations.

== Ministers of Army ==
Image	Name	Dates in office	Political affiliation	Duration
	José Fernandes Leite de Castro	24 October 1930 – 28 June 1932	Independent; military	1 year, 248 days
	Augusto Inácio do Espírito Santo Cardoso	29 June 1932 – 18 January 1934	Independent; military	1 year, 203 days
	Pedro Aurélio de Góis Monteiro	18 January 1934 – 7 May 1935	Independent, later PSD	1 year, 109 days
	João Gomes Ribeiro Filho	7 May 1935 – 5 December 1936	Independent; military	1 year, 212 days
	Eurico Gaspar Dutra	5 December 1936 – 3 August 1945	Independent; military; later PSD	8 years, 241 days
	Pedro Aurélio de Góis Monteiro	3 August 1945 – 14 October 1946	Independent while serving, PSD (from 1947)	1 year, 72 days
	Canrobert Pereira da Costa	14 October 1946 – 31 January 1951	Independent; military	4 years, 109 days
	Newton Estillac Leal	31 January 1951 – 26 March 1952	Independent; nationalist military	1 year, 55 days
	Ciro do Espírito Santo Cardoso	26 March 1952 – 23 February 1954	Independent; military	1 year, 334 days
	Euclides Zenóbio da Costav	24 February 1954 – 25 August 1954	Independent; military	182 days
	Henrique Teixeira Lott	25 August 1954 – 15 February 1960	Independent, PSD by the end of his tenure; presidential candidate in 1960	5 years, 174 days
	Odylio Denys	15 February 1960 – 7 September 1961	Independent; conservative military	1 year, 204 days
	João de Segadas Viana	8 September 1961 – 12 June 1962	PTB; also a federal deputy	277 days
	Nélson de Melo	12 June 1962 – 12 July 1962	Independent; military	30 days
	Amaury Kruel	12 July 1962 – 15 June 1963	Independent; military	338 days
	Jair Dantas Ribeiro	15 June 1963 – 4 April 1964	Independent; military	294 days
	Artur da Costa e Silva	4 April 1964 – 30 June 1966	ARENA (from 1966); military regime	2 years, 87 days
	Ademar de Queirós	1 July 1966 – 15 March 1967	Independent; military	258 days
	Aurélio de Lira Tavares	15 March 1967 – 30 October 1969	Independent; military regime	2 years, 229 days
	Orlando Geisel	30 October 1969 – 15 March 1974	Independent; military regime	4 years, 136 days
	Vicente de Paulo Dale Coutinho	15 March 1974 – 27 May 1974	Independent; military regime	73 days
	Sílvio Frota	27 May 1974 – 12 October 1977	Independent; military regime	3 years, 138 days
	Fernando Belfort Bethlem	12 October 1977 – 15 March 1979	Independent; military regime	1 year, 154 days
	Walter Pires de Carvalho e Albuquerque	15 March 1979 – 15 March 1985	Independent; military regime	6 years, 0 days
	Leônidas Pires Gonçalves	15 March 1985 – 15 March 1990	Independent; military regime	5 years, 0 days
	Carlos Tinoco Ribeiro Gomes	15 March 1990 – 2 October 1992	Independent; military regime	2 years, 201 days
	Zenildo Gonzaga Zoroastro de Lucena	2 October 1992 – 1 January 1999	Independent; military regime	6 years, 91 days
	Gleuber Vieira	1 January 1999 – 10 June 1999	Independent; military regime	160 days

== See also ==
- Armed Forces of the Empire of Brazil
- Ministry of Defense of Brazil
