= Coluna Prestes =

Social rebel movement in Brazil, 1925–1927

Prestes Column
- Part of Tenentism
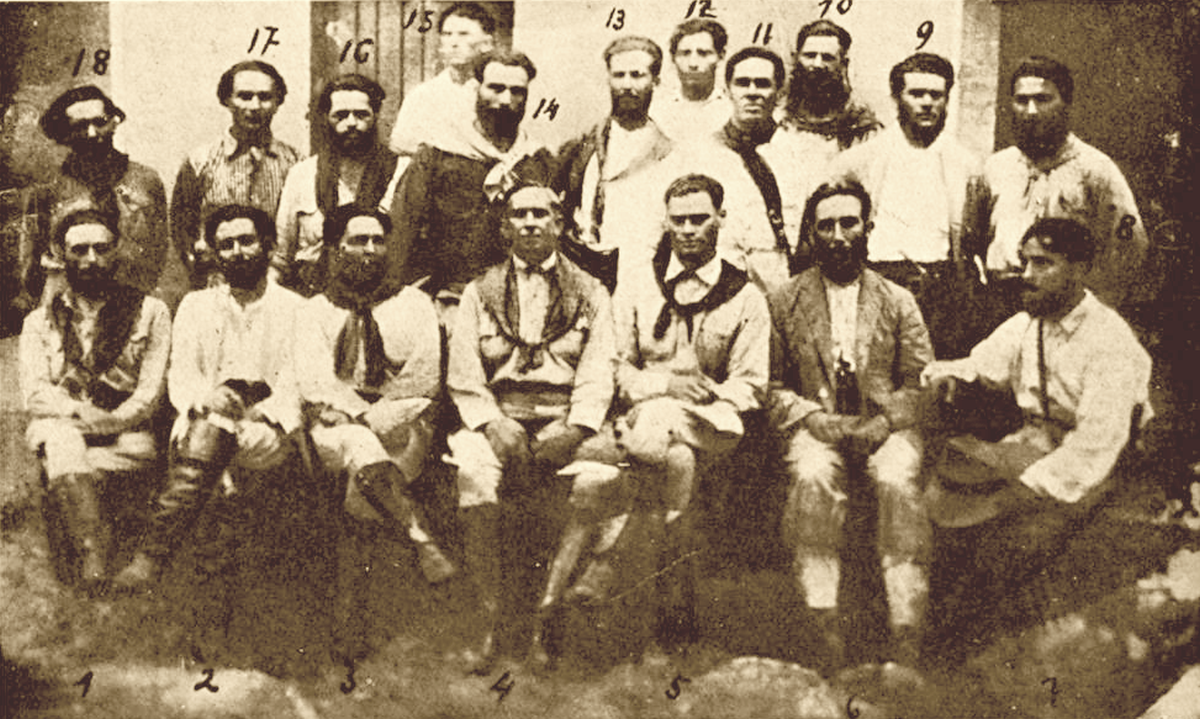
- The column's command (Note: 1. Djalma S. Dutra; 2. Antônio Siqueira Campos; 3. Luís Carlos Prestes; 4. Miguel Costa; 5. Juarez Távora; 6. João Alberto L. de Barros; 7. Oswaldo Cordeiro de Farias; 8. Ítalo Landucci; 9. Rufino Corrêa; 10. Sady V. Machado; 11. Manoel de Lyra; 12. Nelson de Souza; 13. Ary S. Freire; 14. Paulo Kruger da Cunha Cruz; 15. João Pedro; 16. Emigdio Miranda; 17. Athanagildo França e 18. José D. Pinheiro Machado.)
| Date | 1925–1927 |
| Location | Part of São Paulo, Paraná, Santa Catarina, Rio Grande do Sul, Mato Grosso, Minas Gerais, Goiás, Piauí, Maranhão and Ceará |
| Result | Government tactical success; the column withdrew into exile, but government forces failed to capture or destroy it. The march helped publicize tenentist opposition to the First Republic.: The Prestes Column was chased for about 25,000 kilometers within Brazil by the Brazilian government forces.; Surviving rebels fled to Bolivia. |

Belligerents
| Coluna Miguel Costa-Prestes: Tenentist military rebels; Civilian supporters | Brazil: Brazilian Army; Public Forces; Civilian supporters |

Commanders and leaders
| Luís Carlos Prestes; Miguel Costa | Artur Bernardes; Cândido Rondon; Horácio de Matos; Bertoldo Klinger |

Strength
| 1,500 | 14,000–20,000 soldiers |

Casualties and losses
| 600 | Unknown |

The Coluna Prestes, also known as the Coluna Miguel Costa-Prestes or, formally, the 1st Revolutionary Division, was a Brazilian political-military movement associated with Tenentism that operated between 1924 and 1927. It emerged from dissatisfaction with the government of Artur Bernardes and with the oligarchic order of the First Brazilian Republic, especially the political arrangements commonly associated with the café com leite system. Its demands included the secret ballot, the defense of public education, and broader criticism of poverty and social injustice in Brazil. Although the Column was organized as an armed march, several authors have noted that its composition was not limited to professional officers. Many of its rank-and-file participants were rural workers, including illiterate or semi-literate men, and about fifty women accompanied the march, several of whom took part in combat. Over roughly two and a half years, the Column, usually estimated at about 1,500 combatants, marched approximately 25,000 kilometres through thirteen Brazilian states while avoiding destruction by government forces. Its survival helped weaken the prestige of the oligarchic government and kept tenentist opposition active until the political crisis that culminated in the Revolution of 1930.

== Background ==
The Column developed within the wider context of Tenentism, a movement led mainly by junior army officers but not usually interpreted as a purely militarist movement. Tenentist officers opposed the dominance of regional oligarchies in the First Republic and called for political reforms, but they did not generally advocate the creation of a permanent military government. Instead, their program was commonly framed around a reformed civilian political order, liberal constitutionalism, and opposition to electoral fraud. The immediate origins of the Column lay in the failed revolts of 1924. After the suppression of the São Paulo Revolt of 1924, rebel forces from São Paulo retreated toward western Paraná. In Rio Grande do Sul, new uprisings broke out in October 1924, including in Santo Ângelo, São Luiz Gonzaga, São Borja, and Uruguaiana. These southern rebels later joined the remaining São Paulo forces, forming the basis of the Coluna Miguel Costa-Prestes.

== Uprising ==
=== Rio Grande do Sul ===
The Rio Grande do Sul revolt began on 28 October 1924 in the Missões region. Captain Luís Carlos Prestes, then commanding the 1st Railway Battalion at Santo Ângelo, encouraged the uprising, while other rebel groups appeared in São Luiz Gonzaga, São Borja and Uruguaiana under leaders such as Pedro Gay, Rui Zubaran and Juarez Távora. In São Borja, Antônio de Siqueira Campos helped lead rebel forces after returning clandestinely from exile in Buenos Aires.

In December 1924, government forces of roughly 14,000 men moved against São Luiz Gonzaga, intending to surround and suppress the rebels. Prestes avoided encirclement by dispersing his men around the city and then marching at night toward Ijuí, exploiting a weak point in the loyalist positions. This use of mobility became one of the Column's defining tactics and was later described by Prestes as a "war of movement".

On 3 January 1925, loyalist forces attempted to block the rebels near Nova Ramada in what became known as the Battle of Ramada. The combat lasted several hours and caused significant rebel losses, but the Column again broke through and continued north toward the Uruguay River.

=== Santa Catarina, Paraná and the 1st Revolutionary Division ===
After crossing the Uruguay River, the rebels moved on foot through Santa Catarina, having lost many of their horses during the crossing. In February 1925 they reached Barracão, Paraná, near the border region. There, the Column fought engagements including the battles of Maria Preta and Separação, where rebel manoeuvres reportedly caused confusion among loyalist forces.

In April 1925, the southern rebels joined the São Paulo revolutionary forces at Foz do Iguaçu. On 12 April, Prestes met Isidoro Dias Lopes and Miguel Costa, and the combined force was reorganized as the 1st Revolutionary Division. Its four detachments were commanded by Siqueira Campos, João Alberto Lins de Barros, Osvaldo Cordeiro de Farias and Djalma Dutra. The commanders then decided to continue the march toward Mato Grosso, passing through Paraguay, while Isidoro Dias Lopes went to Argentina to organize external support for the movement.

=== Mato Grosso, Goiás and Minas Gerais ===
After entering southern Mato Grosso, the Column encountered forces commanded by Major Bertoldo Klinger. At Cabeceira do Apa, the detachments led by Siqueira Campos and João Alberto fought Klinger's troops for two days and forced them to withdraw. The rebels then advanced toward Goiás, clashing at different moments with Klinger's forces and with the Goiás police before moving through the Serra do Paranã and into Minas Gerais.

On 7 September 1925, the Column returned to Goiás and marched northward through the region that is now Tocantins. During this phase, the rebels continued to use deception and mobility to evade loyalist forces. In one episode, government aircraft were sent to bomb the Column on the Brazilian Highlands, but poor weather prevented the attack from succeeding.

=== Northern and Northeastern Brazil ===
The march reached Maranhão in November 1925 and entered Piauí in December, where the rebels fought government forces at Teresina. Before the engagement, the Column cut telegraph lines between Barão de Grajaú and Teresina. It then moved toward Ceará, where Juarez Távora was captured, and crossed into Rio Grande do Norte in January 1926.

In February 1926, the Column entered Paraíba and faced resistance in Piancó, where local forces were led by the priest and political leader Aristides Ferreira da Cruz. After heavy fighting, the town was occupied by the revolutionaries. The Column then crossed Pernambuco and Bahia, where it was opposed by regional political bosses and irregular armed groups.

The rebels later moved toward northern Minas Gerais, hoping to link their campaign to a revolt expected in Pernambuco under Lieutenant Cleto Campelo. After that revolt failed and the Column was threatened by a large loyalist force, the commanders abandoned the southward movement and returned through Bahia, eventually crossing Piauí and Goiás before reaching Mato Grosso again in October 1926.

== Meeting in Foz do Iguaçu ==
The leaders of the revolution held a meeting in Foz do Iguaçu to discuss their course of action, with general Isidoro stating his desire to cease hostilities. The proposal advanced by Miguel Costa and Prestes prevailed: it was decided that the revolutionary action would continue, but a war of movement would be pursued: the column would invade Mato Grosso. The rebel forces were reorganized as the 1st Revolutionary Division numbering 1,500 ordinary infantrymen, 800 gaúchos (Note: In Brazil "gaúcho" is the demonym used for the inhabitants of the Rio Grande do Sul state.) and 700 paulistas.

== Exile in Bolivia ==
Between February and March 1927, after crossing the Pantanal, part of the column led by Siqueira Campos arrived in Paraguay while the rest entered Bolivia. In view of the column's deteriorating military and logistical situation, Isidoro Dias Lopes instructed the remaining rebels to go into exile. Miguel Costa went to Paso de los Libres while Prestes and two hundred more men headed for Gaiba. On 5 July 1927, the exiles inaugurated a monument in Gaiba in honor of the dead in the column's campaign.

== Participation of women ==
Women who accompanied the Column were often known as viandeiras. Their participation has received limited attention in the historiography of the movement, and contemporary accounts frequently framed them through gendered stereotypes rather than as political or military actors. Nevertheless, later studies and memoirs indicate that around fifty women marched with the Column, most of them connected to the southern detachment, and that some of them fought alongside the rebels.

One example discussed in the press was Alzira, a woman captured during the campaign and described in a 1926 issue of the Salvador newspaper A Tarde as wearing riding clothes, boots and a cartridge belt and handling a carbine like an experienced soldier. Such accounts suggest that women's roles in the Column extended beyond camp support, even though rebel commanders and later narratives often minimized their participation.

== Participation of children and adolescents ==
Recent scholarship has also drawn attention to the presence of children and adolescents in the Column. A study published in Revista Cadernos do Ceom argues that, a century after the march, the experiences of children in the movement remain largely invisible in the historiography of the Coluna Prestes.

== Consequences ==
The Column did not overthrow the federal government and eventually withdrew into exile, but the government's inability to destroy it damaged the prestige of the First Republic's oligarchic order. The movement helped keep tenentist criticism of the regime alive and contributed to the broader political crisis that preceded the Revolution of 1930. Many tenentists later reappeared in national politics during and after 1930, although the post-1930 period also brought further instability, including coups and authoritarian governments.
