= Juarez Távora =

Juarez Távora may refer to:

- Juarez Távora, Paraíba, a municipality in the state of Paraíba, Brazil
- Juarez Távora (general), Brazilian general and politician
