= Bertoldo Klinger =

Brazilian divisional general

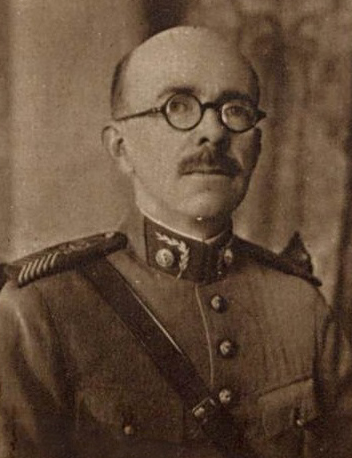
- Klinger, c. 1932
- Born: Bertoldo Ritter Klinger; January 1, 1884; Rio Grande, Rio Grande do Sul, Empire of Brazil
- Died: January 31, 1969 (aged 85); Rio de Janeiro, Guanabara, Brazil
- Education: Praia Vermelha Military School (Portuguese: Escola Militar da Praia Vermelha)
- Spouse: Leopoldina de Almeida Klinger
- Military career
- Allegiance: Brazil
- Branch: Brazilian Army
- Service years: 1901 – 1947
- Rank: Divisional General
- Commands: Constitutionalist Army; Military Circumscription of Mato Grosso
- Conflicts: Vaccine Revolt; São Paulo Revolt of 1924; Revolution of 1930; Constitutionalist Revolution
- Other work: Author

Bertoldo Ritter Klinger (1 January 1884 — 31 January 1969) was a Brazilian divisional general in the Brazilian Army and commander in the Constitutionalist Revolution of 1932.

== Biography ==
=== Early years ===
Klinger was born in the city of Rio Grande, on 1 January 1884, to Antônio Klinger, an Austrian immigrant, and Suzana Ritter Klinger, a descendant of Germans who migrated to Brazil.

His father was a settler in the Nova Petrópolis colony, which at the time was part of São Leopoldo, and worked there as a teacher. In 1883, Antônio took over a brewery in that municipality. After the Proclamation of the Republic, in November 1889, Klinger's father obtained Brazilian nationality and with the new Constitution promulgated in 1891 he was appointed captain of the National Guard, where he also reached the rank of major and the post of advisor.

Bertoldo Klinger began his basic studies at two German and one French colleges, which were based in the city of Rio Grande. In that city, he lived until 1899 when he joined the then Preparatory and Tactical School of Rio Pardo in Rio Grande do Sul. In 1901, he was transferred to the Praia Vermelha Military School, headquartered in the city of Rio de Janeiro, then federal capital, and there he became an ensign-student until finishing his course in 1903.

In 1904, together with other military companions, including Euclides Figueiredo, he participated in the revolt against mandatory vaccination, in Rio de Janeiro. As a result, he was arrested, only returning to the Army the following year, when he received amnesty.

In 1910, the Brazilian government received an offer from the German government for a training course for Brazilian officers, which consisted of a two-year exchange internship. Klinger was one of the selected officers, having been assigned to the 24th Artillery Regiment of the German Army located in the town of Güstrow. During that period, the young officer came into contact with the innovations of military technologies in that country, one of the most advanced at the time, in addition to assimilating German military doctrine. In 1913, he returned to Brazil, assuming an instructor position in the 1st Artillery Regiment of Rio de Janeiro.

=== Return to Brazil and later life ===
In 1913, together with Brasílio Taborda, Euclides Figueiredo, Estevão Leitão de Carvalho, and other military officers, he helped found the magazine "A Defesa Nacional " (The National Defense), intending to spread new ideas among the military as well as advocate for improvements in the Brazilian Army. The strong influence of German military doctrine and his commitment to disseminating it in the Brazilian Army, led Klinger and others responsible for the magazine to be jokingly nicknamed "Young Turks", in a clear reference to the young Turkish military who, like those Brazilian soldiers, sought to revitalize their country's Army with the learning acquired in the German Army. At that magazine, he was chief editor. He also sometimes criticized the political decisions adopted by the government regarding the Army, for example, when the government made merely political indications in command, in addition to strongly criticizing the implementation of the French military mission in the reformulation of the Brazilian Army.

With the São Paulo Revolt of 1924, he was arrested on charges of collaborating with the rebellious lieutenants. His role in that episode is of great controversy among historians since in that conflict he was also imprisoned by the rebel leaders on charges of treason to the movement. However, later on, he confirmed his opposition to acting in the repression of that rebellion, which would later form the so-called Prestes Column, a guerrilla force founded by lieutenants who marched through the interior of the country, through the North and Northeast states, aiming at an armed revolution against the federal government and the Old Republic.

Regarding the role of Major Klinger in that conflict, Captain Juarez Távora, a member of the Prestes Column, wrote:

(...) between the last fortnight of June and the end of July 1925 (...) the Division suffered a tenacious persecution - marked by the clashes of Paraizo, Bahús, Rio-Verdinho, Zeca Lopes and Annapolis - which forced it, at times, to defend itself with sacrifice to deflect the repeated blows that were delivered to it. The soul of these clashes was Major Bertoldo Klinger - a man to whom multiple circumstances should join the current of heroic claims, which then excited the countrymen - but whom an inexplicable derision of fate had transformed into a pre-excellent support of governmental tyranny. We have already had the opportunity to refer to him, since the beginning of the Mato Grosso campaign. His effectiveness as a governmental combatant culminated, however, during the first month of the campaign in Goiás. Besieged in Bahús; contained in Rio-Verdinho; surrounded, again, in Zeca Lopes; and, a month later, beaten in Annapolis - he forced the revolutionary arms into clashes which, if they were not favorable to him, sometimes did not suit the revolution either. After that, in their long pilgrimage through the center of the country, the revolutionary leaders did not find an opportunity to measure up to an antagonist willing to fight them, with tenacity and courage. The sincerity with which, from our point of view, we have been appreciating various aspects of this ungrateful fratricidal struggle, makes us very free to do justice to the deserved value of an adversary. This honor we surrender, here, conscientiously, to Major Bertoldo Klinger.

=== The 1930 revolution ===
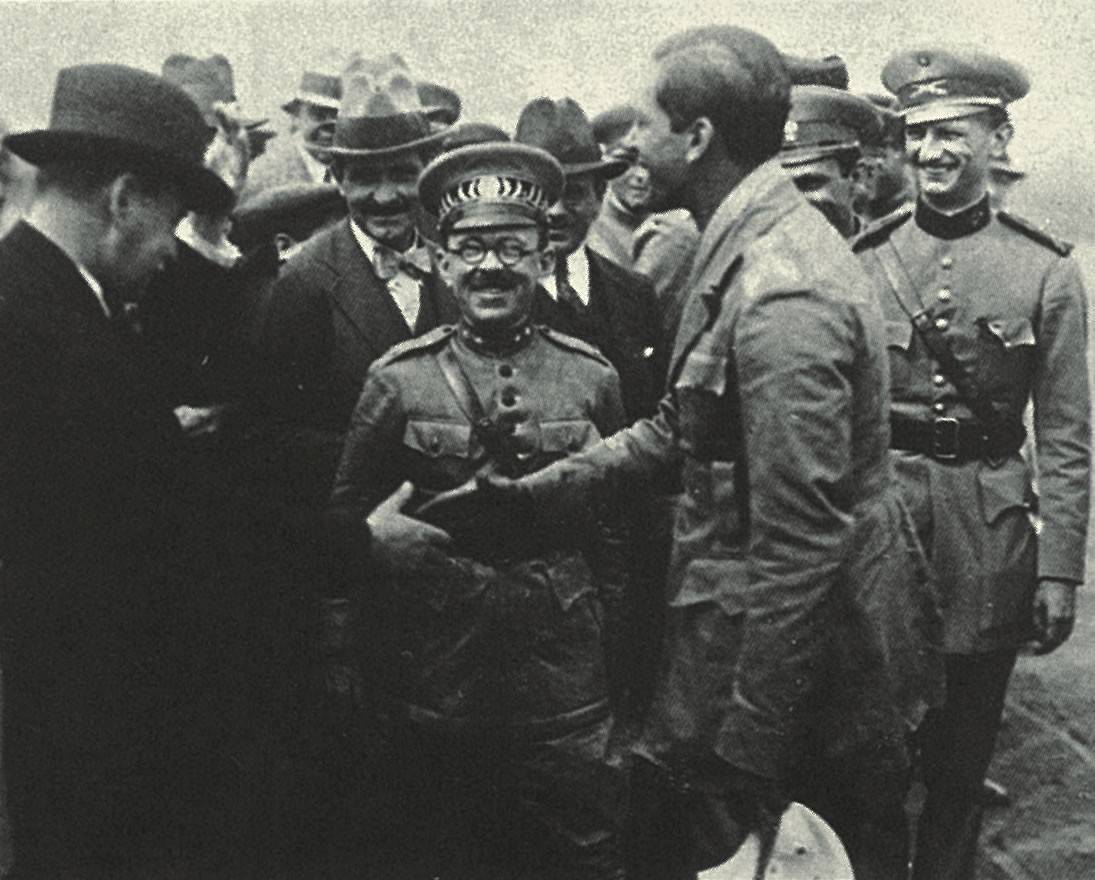
On 10 September 1932, General Klinger in the Campo de Marte Airport in São Paulo during an aerial presentation.

In 1930 he was against the movement that aimed to depose the President of the Republic Washington Luís, although he had contacts with some elements of the Liberal Alliance, who articulated the deposition. However, with the Revolution of 1930, which took place in October of that year, he ended up joining the military group and actively acting in that coup d'état. The provisional military junta, which ruled the country between October and November of that year, appointed Klinger as chief of police of the Federal District, and in this role prohibited any type of public meeting across the country and repressed any political manifestation. He even supported the provisional government, assumed by Getúlio Vargas in November of that year, expressing public support and praise for the Revolution and its outcome.

He was promoted to brigadier general the following year and assigned to assume the Military Circumscription of Mato Grosso. However, he gradually began to alienate the political group of lieutenants supporting the provisional government and leaders of the 1930 Revolution, even prohibiting his subordinates from joining the Clube 3 de Outubro, a political association of lieutenants that supported Vargas.

=== The constitutionalist revolution and his exile in Portugal ===
In 1932, already far from the political group that supported the provisional government, he joined the groups that conspired against the Vargas government, led by the São Paulo elite and the gaúchos, who articulated an armed revolt to depose the dictatorship imposed by Getúlio Vargas and his supporters, later called the Constitutionalist Revolution of 1932. He was then chosen to exercise the Supreme Command of the so-called Constitutionalist Army. This revolt was prematurely precipitated by him to 9 July 1932, due to a deliberately offensive letter he sent to the newly appointed minister of war, General Augusto Inácio do Espírito Santo Cardoso, earlier that month. As a result, on July 8, he was compulsorily put into reserve by General Cardoso, through an administrative reform. The letter signaled to the provisional government the upcoming uprising that until then had only been a conspiracy. Klinger's historic letter, sent on 1 July 1932 to the then Minister of War, was in the following terms:

Official letter no. 372 - H.Q. in Campo Grande, 1-VII-32, - To his Excellency Mr. Divisional Gen. Augusto Ignacio Espirito Santo Cardoso, Minister of War, Brig. Gen. Bertoldo Klinger – Subject: Your appointment as Minister.

Mr. General, The appointment of your Excellency, at this moment nationally, to manager of State affairs in the Department of the Army, is notable for several reasons, each more relevant as I loyally shall explain:

1) In this national moment, I repeat - when the Nation, notably its Army, expected clear, straight and firm government acts that, for the better, would translate the darkness, sinuosity and laxity with which the government has enunciated and implemented its purposes - this appointment arises. The predecessor of your Excellency was removed, after all, by the outcry aroused by the role he, unaware of the Army personnel and ultra-ambitious, lent himself to, sanctioning all assaults on internal and external discipline, at the whim of a handful of extremists, increasingly frantic in the face of notable disgust. Your Excellency has just by main title to replace such a minister – without overshadowing those you might have had in a normal situation – is that of taking on, presumably, even better, the same role. Everyone can see that the son of your Excellency was the guarantor of this, captain Dulcidio, red extremist from the 13th hour;

2) The Army would like to know if you would resist a health inspection, given the fatal breakdown that the years have produced. Which, presumably, having already nine years gone by, led you to spontaneously move into the reserve. And only "mens sana"...

3) Your Excellency which, thus, cannot instill confidence from the point of view of your necessary entire possession of physical fitness, also only inspires apprehensions on your moral aspect, since you were one of the signatories, and even passes as inspiring, of the famous note of a syndicate commission appointed in the early days of the ruling revolution, note which invited officials to denounce their comrades;

4) Your Excellency has been away from active service for many years, as I have already mentioned, and in it did not reach the generalate or take a general staff course, so that you never had the responsibility and need for general considerations about the problems of the Army, especially in its intertwining with other national problems. Thus, your appointment is nothing more than a re-edition, thirteen years later, of that notorious invention of a civil minister in the military portfolio, something for which the Army has not yet adapted its organization to this day. In particular, your Excellency is oblivious to any evolution associated with the presence of the French military mission among us. A civilian, or a "military" man who only has the memory and the pension of a military officer, although this pension has been increased for a long time thanks to a strange call to active service, a similar holder of this office will be a minister only in appearance: the prestige of authority, the discipline, deeply suffer damage, in view of the evidence that your local lieutenants in the cabinet are going to rule the colonels and generals, heads of services and commanders of large units;

5) That same prestige of authority, including that of the government, that same discipline, come out laughable if not deplorably, limping in the face of the surprising revelation that the government did not have a general for Minister of War, a government which, however, at its discretion, eliminated from active service a roster of generals and promoted a lot of new ones. Not even among those who escaped the heavy cleaning, nor among those manufactured by the ruling revolution, not a single one is good enough to say in the Army, the institution most affected by the dominant revolution, the word of the national revolution.

Health and fraternity – Gen. Bertoldo Klinger

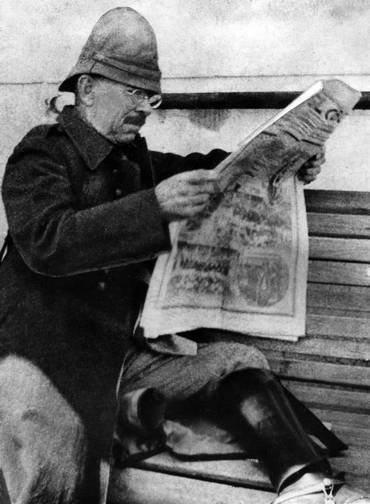
Klinger aboard the ship "Pedro I" during his trip into exile in Portugal, in November 1932

With the beginning of the conflict, he went to São Paulo state to assume the leadership of the revolt. On the morning of 12 July 1932, he arrived in São Paulo, being received with celebrations and was sworn in as Supreme Commander of the Constitutionalist Army. However, the promised reinforcements of 5,000 military troops from the state of Mato Grosso and military resources didn't come, due to the dismissal of the general in command of the Circumscription of Mato Grosso on July 8, which made the total adhesion of those troops unfeasible, particularly the units located in Cuiabá, which forced the troops of Mato Grosso who joined the uprising to engage in the defense of their own state. In the following weeks, the expected support from the state of Rio Grande do Sul and Minas Gerais also failed, which led the rebelled state of São Paulo to remain in a defensive position since the beginning of the conflict, hoping for a possible reversal. Over the three months of conflict, Klinger, along with other commanders, employed typical military strategies of German doctrine, an example being the defence in depth, which greatly managed to delay the advance of federal troops on the capital of São Paulo, despite the superiority in numbers and in the overall military power of the federal government. At the end of September 1932, with the failure of the uprising in Rio Grande do Sul by the rebels led by Borges de Medeiros, and when the impossibility of continuing the fighting in São Paulo due to lack of military resources was evident, Klinger proposed an armistice to the federal government with the intention of starting negotiations for the definitive end of the conflict. After the conflict ended on 2 October 1932, Klinger was arrested and sent into exile in Portugal in November of that year. However, in May 1934, he received amnesty and returned to Brazil.

=== Final years ===
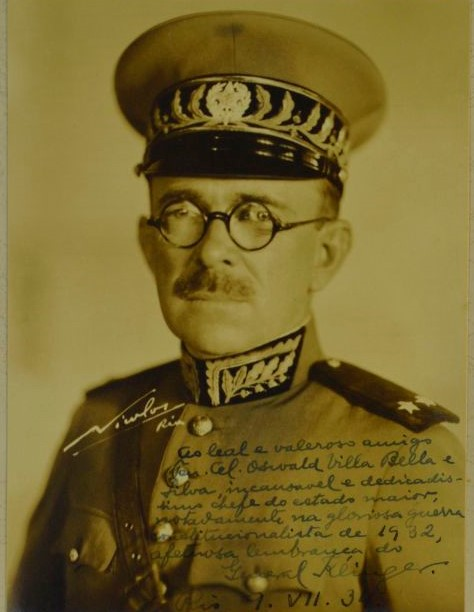
General Bertoldo Klinger.

After his exile and return to Brazil, Klinger devoted himself intensely to literature, publishing several works on a variety of topics. In 1947, after the country's redemocratization, he was reincorporated into active service in the Army, after a decision that invalidated his administrative reform that had taken place 15 years earlier, and received the rank of Divisional General counted since 25 December 1945. In that same year he was retired.

In 1940, he published "Ortografia Simplificada Brasileira" (Brazilian Simplified Orthography), a book that generated controversy over the years and also made Klinger a laughingstock on some occasions by the national press because of the unusual proposal to revise the spelling then in force in the country. General Klinger even sent letters to federal government authorities using the spelling he advocated in his book. The work since then has served as a reference for Portuguese language scholars.

At the end of 1954, he had a brief role as assistant to General Pantaleão da Silva Pessoa, on the board of the Federal Commission for Supply and Prices, which was linked to the Ministry of Labour.

He supported the military coup that overthrew President João Goulart and implemented the military regime in the country, which took place in March 1964.

In August 1965, he was admitted by decree of the then President of the Republic to the Order of Military Merit with the rank of commander.

He died in the city of Rio de Janeiro, on 31 January 1969, being buried in the Inhaúma cemetery. He was married to Leopoldina de Almeida Klinger with whom he had six children.

== Homages ==
In São Paulo, there is the General Bertoldo Klinger square. In his hometown, Rio Grande, there is also a street named after him. In Campo Grande, the city from which he commanded the Military Circumscription of Mato Grosso in the 1930s, he is also remembered with a street named after him. In Nioaque, there is an avenue named after him. There are also several other places around the country named in his memory.

There is a military march composed by Heráclito Paraguassu Guerreiro named "No. 3 General Klinger" in his honour.

The Historical, Geographical and Genealogical Institute of Sorocaba, linked to the Academy of Terrestrial Military History of Brazil (AHIMTB), has the name General Bertoldo Klinger.

== Works ==
- Klinger, Bertoldo (1926). Como cumpri meu dever. Rio de Janeiro.
- Klinger, Bertoldo; et al. (1933). Nós e a Dictadura: a jornada revolucionária de 1932. Rio de Janeiro.
- Klinger, Bertoldo (1933). Manobras em Nioaque em 1931. Rio de Janeiro.
- Klinger, Bertoldo (1940). Ortografia simplificada brasileira: simplificada e uniformizada. Rio de Janeiro.
- Klinger, Bertoldo (translation and notes); Seidler, Carl (1941). Dez Anos no Brasil. Rio de Janeiro.
- Klinger, Bertoldo (1949–1953). Narrativas Autobiográficas. Rio de Janeiro.
- Klinger, Bertoldo (1956). Noites nuas. Rio de Janeiro: Livre expressão.
- Klinger, Bertoldo (1958). Parada e desfile duma vida de voluntário do Brasil na primeira metade do século. Rio de Janeiro.
- Klinger, Bertoldo (1962). Sê e sê. Rio de Janeiro.
- Klinger, Bertoldo (1965). Uma família Ritter no Brasil desde 1846. Rio de Janeiro.
