= Zenildo de Lucena =

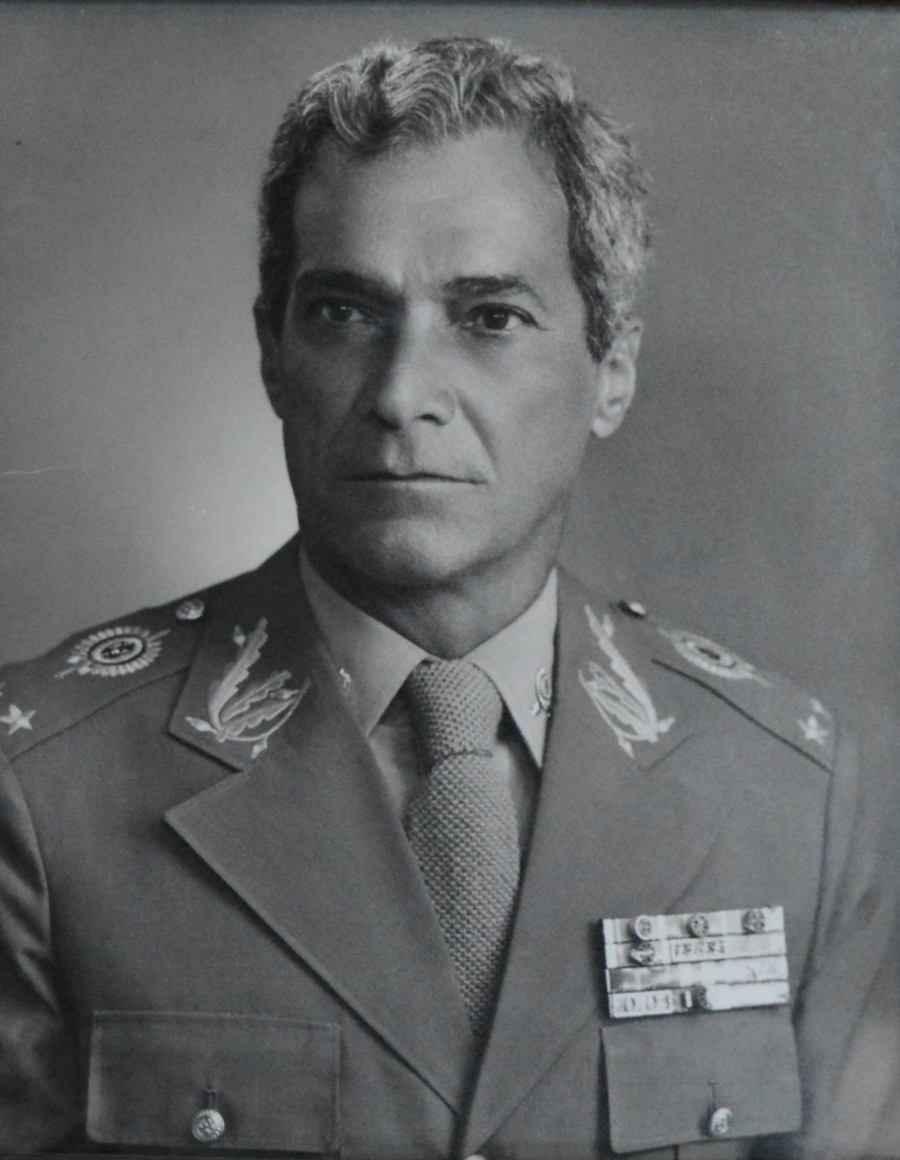

Minister of the Army
- In office 2 October 1992 – 1 January 1999
- Preceded by: Carlos Tinoco Ribeiro Gomes
- Succeeded by: Gleuber Vieira

Personal details
- Born: Zenildo Gonzaga Zoroastro de Lucena; 2 January 1930 São Bento do Una, Brazil
- Died: 26 March 2017 (aged 87) Rio de Janeiro, Rio de Janeiro, Brazil
- Party: Independent
- Education: Military Academy of Agulhas Negras; Escola de Comando e Estado-Maior do Exército
- Awards: Order of Military Merit

Military service
- Allegiance: Brazil
- Branch/service: Brazilian Army
- Years of service: 28 February 1945–1 January 1999
- Rank: Army general
- Battles/wars: Cold War; 1964 Brazilian coup d'état

Zenildo Gonzaga Zoroastro de Lucena (São Bento do Una, January 2, 1930 –Rio de Janeiro, March 26, 2017) was a Brazilian Army General who served as Minister of the Army between 1992 and 1999.

== Biography ==
Zenildo was born in São Bento do Una, a municipality located in the Agreste region of Pernambuco. He was the son of schoolteacher Maria Augusta Siqueira de Lucena and civil servant José Higino Homem de Lucena.

He entered the Military Academy of Agulhas Negras in 1948 and was commissioned as an Aspirant Officer in the Cavalry branch in December 1950.

He ranked first in his class at both the School for Officer Advancement and the Army Command and General Staff College. As a result of these academic achievements, he was awarded the Marshal Hermes Medal (silver-gilt, with two crowns).

He was affiliated with the more nationalist factions within the Army and was part of a group of officers that supported the nomination of General Albuquerque Lima to succeed General Artur da Costa e Silva as President of the Republic. The group’s objective was to prevent the nomination of General Emílio Garrastazu Médici; however, Médici was ultimately elected by the National Congress on October 25, 1969. As a colonel, he commanded the 2nd Guards Cavalry Regiment in Rio de Janeiro and, between February 18, 1978, and June 23, 1979, the Army Preparatory Cadet School in Campinas.

He was promoted to Brigadier General on March 31, 1983, and commanded the 11th Armored Infantry Brigade, also in Campinas, from May 5 of that year until January 14, 1985.

Between January 25, 1985, and January 27, 1987, he commanded the Army Command and General Staff College.

Subsequently, he served as Chief of Staff of the Second Army in São Paulo from February 3 to November 24, 1987. On November 25 of that same year, he was promoted to Major General (General-de-Divisão).

He also served as Deputy Chief of the Army General Staff in Brasília from September 1989 to March 1992.

He was promoted to General of the Army (General de Exército) on March 31, 1992, he served as Head of the General Department of Personnel between April 2 and August 3 of that year.

Following this, he assumed the position of commander of the Eastern Military Command in Rio de Janeiro, serving from August 21 to October 7, 1992.

He was awarded the Order of Military Merit, Zenildo was promoted to the rank of Grand Cross in July 1992.

He left his position at the Military Command of the East to take charge of the Ministry of the Army on October 9, 1992. He remained in this role throughout the administration of President Itamar Franco and during the first presidential term of Fernando Henrique Cardoso, serving until December 1998.

When he assumed leadership of the Ministry of the Army, Brazil’s nascent democracy was facing its first trial by fire. Fernando Collor—the first president elected by direct vote since 1960—had been removed from office. Hardline elements sensed a power vacuum and began stirring within the barracks. The conspiracy was nipped in the bud; General Zenildo reined in the would-be coup plotters, demanded adherence to the military hierarchy, and secured the barracks' support for the new administration of Itamar Franco.

His firm leadership was recognized, and he remained in his post following the inauguration of Fernando Henrique Cardoso. During the Cardoso administration, Zenildo once again demonstrated a talent for crisis management. He endorsed the Law on Political Disappeared Persons and the provision of reparations to the families of victims of the military regime. He also supported the creation of the Ministry of Defense, which placed all three branches of the Armed Forces under civilian authority. In the first volume of his "Presidential Diaries", Fernando Henrique praised the officer’s competence and loyalty. "He is discreet, a democrat, possesses command, and provides stability to the Army’s rear guard," the former president wrote.

After handing over the Ministry of the Army to General Gleuber Vieira, he took up residence in the city of Rio de Janeiro, where he passed away on March 26, 2017, at the age of 87.

Zenildo was married to Maria Edith Jourdan Lucena, with whom he had two daughters and five grandchildren.
