= Nova Ramada =

Municipality in Rio Grande do Sul, Brazil

Coordinates: 28°03′50″S 53°41′49″W

- Municipality
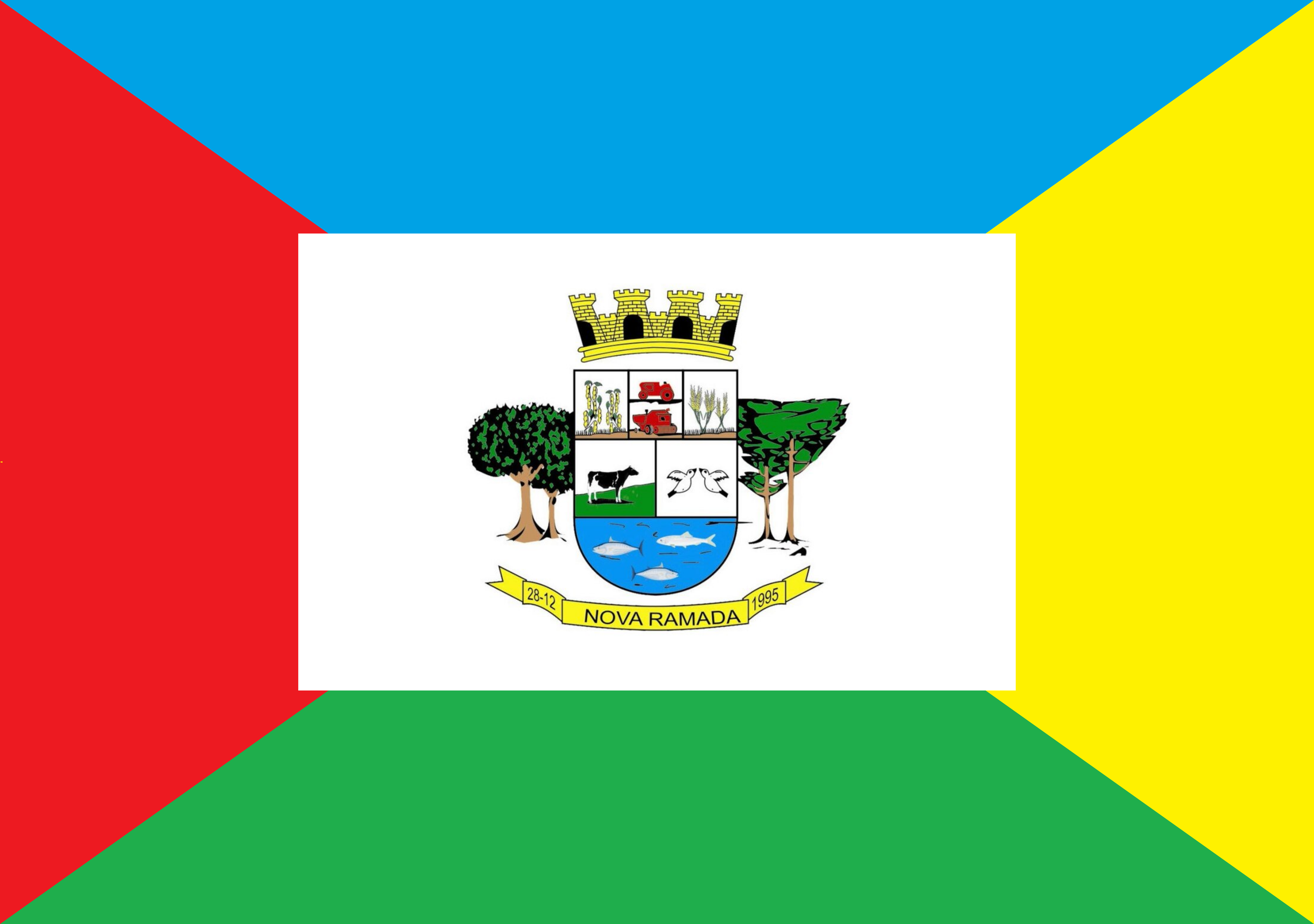
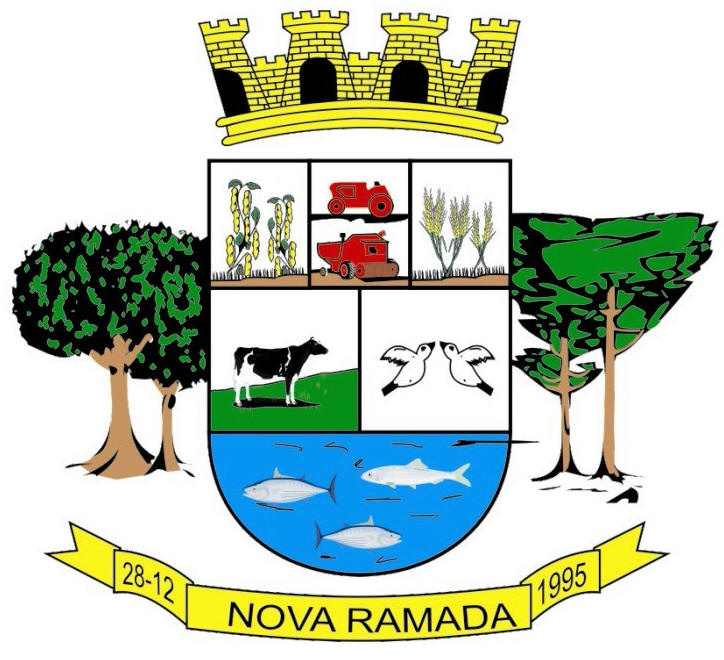
- Flag Coat of arms
- Interactive map of Nova Ramada
- Country: Brazil
- Time zone: UTC−3 (BRT)

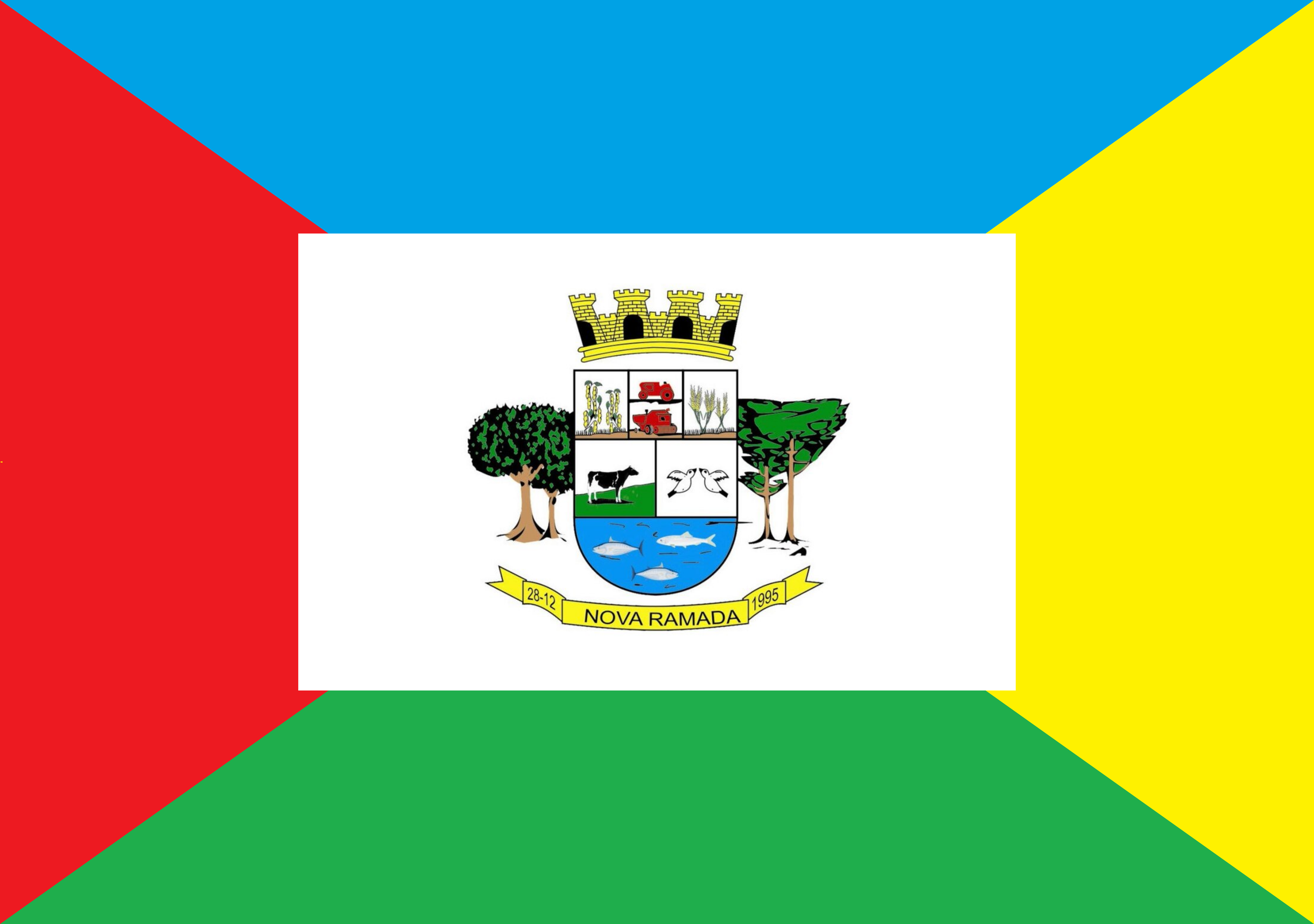
Flag of the municipality of Nova Ramada

Nova Ramada is a municipality in the state of Rio Grande do Sul, Brazil. As of 2020, the estimated population was 2,218.

== See also ==
- List of municipalities in Rio Grande do Sul
