= Juarez Távora, Paraíba =

Coordinates: 7°10′S 35°34′W

Juarez Távora
- Municipality
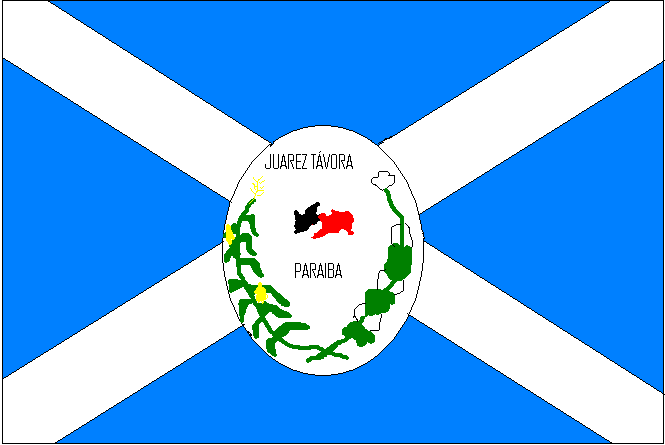
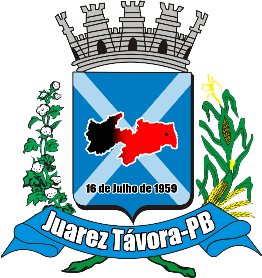
- Flag Coat of arms
- Interactive map of Juarez Távora
- Country: Brazil
- Region: South
- State: Paraíba
- Mesoregion: Agreste Paraibano

Population (2020)
  - Total: 7,976
- Time zone: UTC−3 (BRT)

Juarez Távora (Central northeastern portuguese pronunciation: [ʒwɐˈɾejɦ ˈtavoɾɐ]) is a municipality in the state of Paraíba in the Northeast Region of Brazil.

== See also ==
- List of municipalities in Paraíba
