= Constitutionalist Revolution =

1932 civil war in Brazil

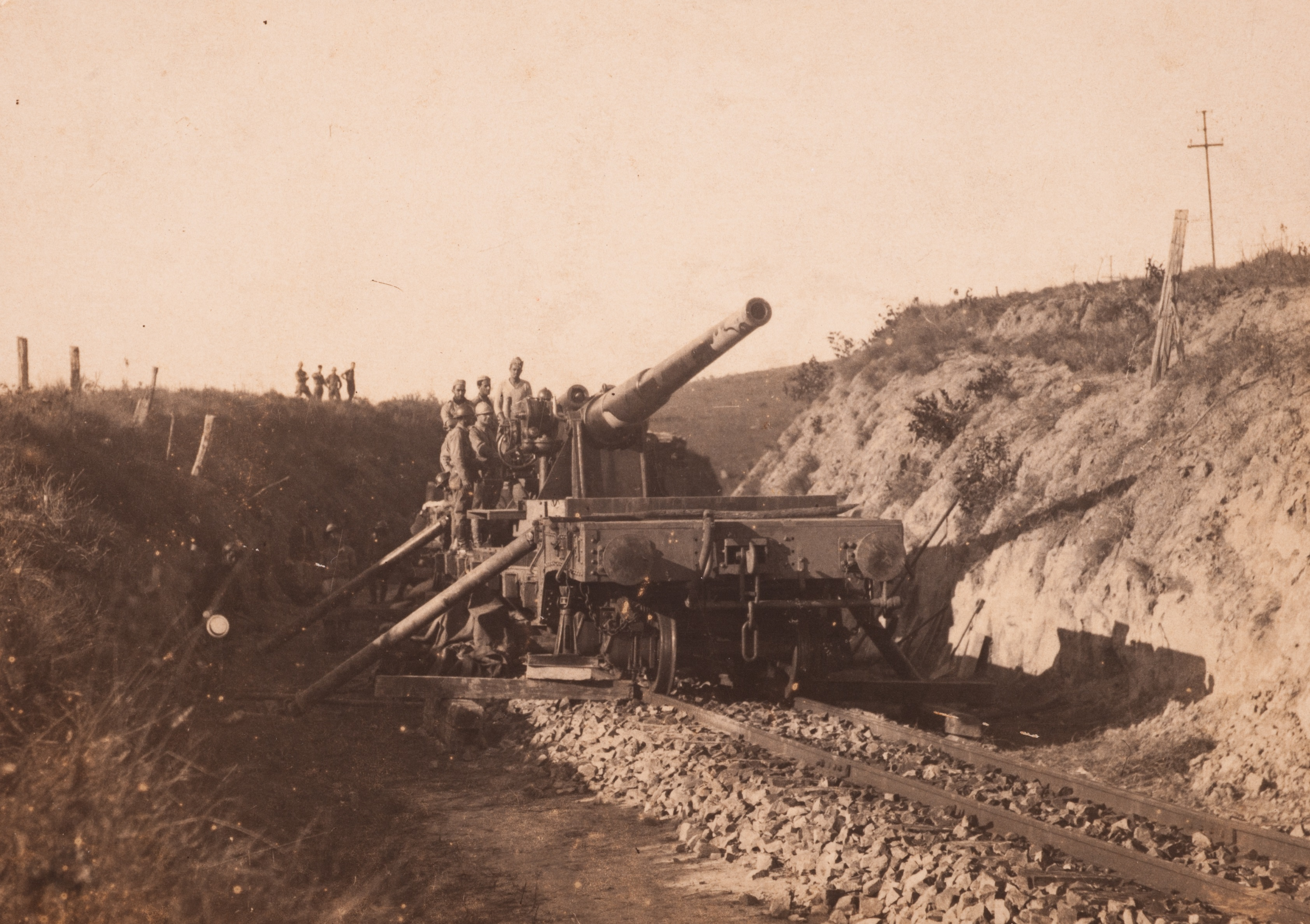
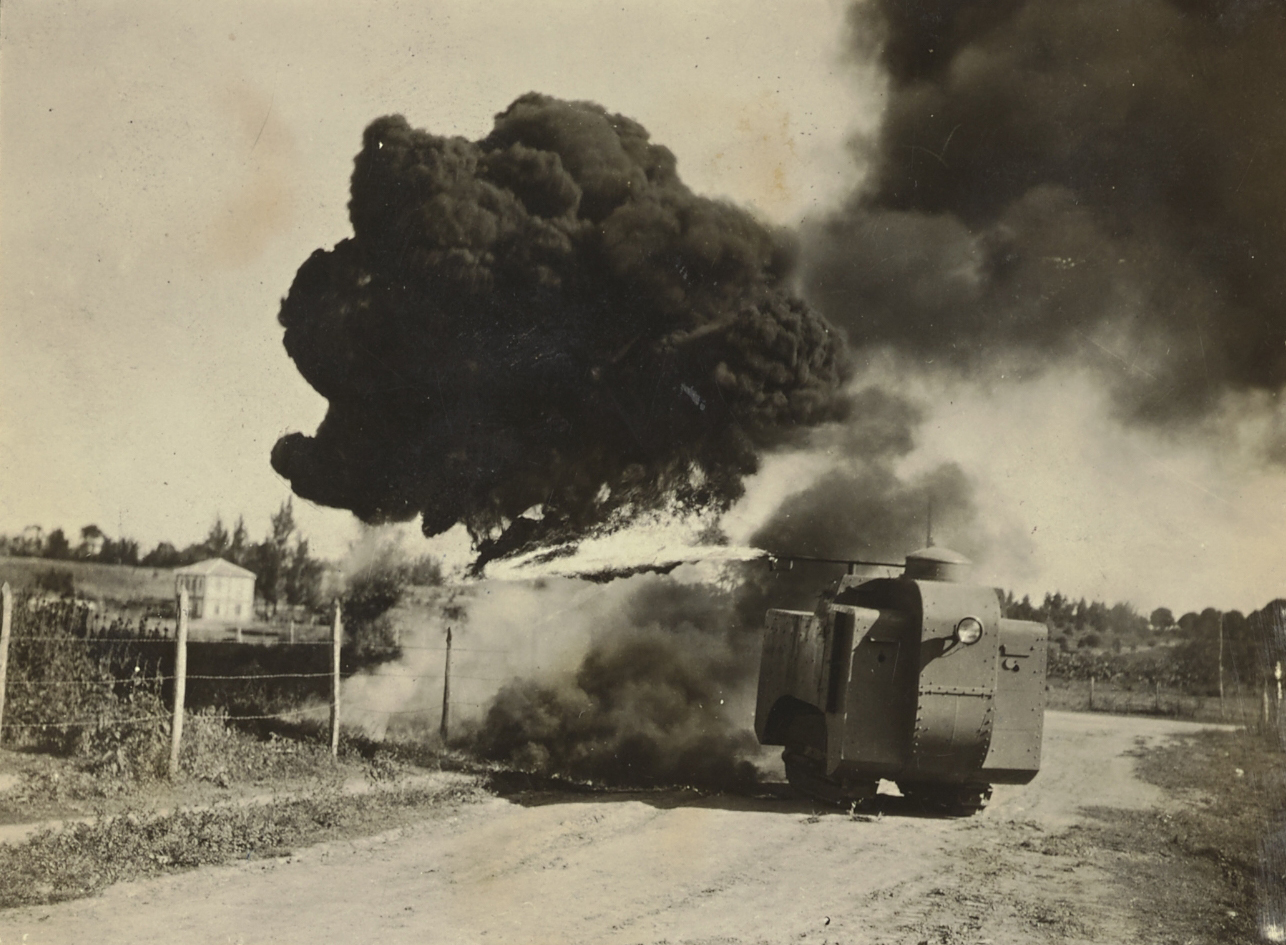
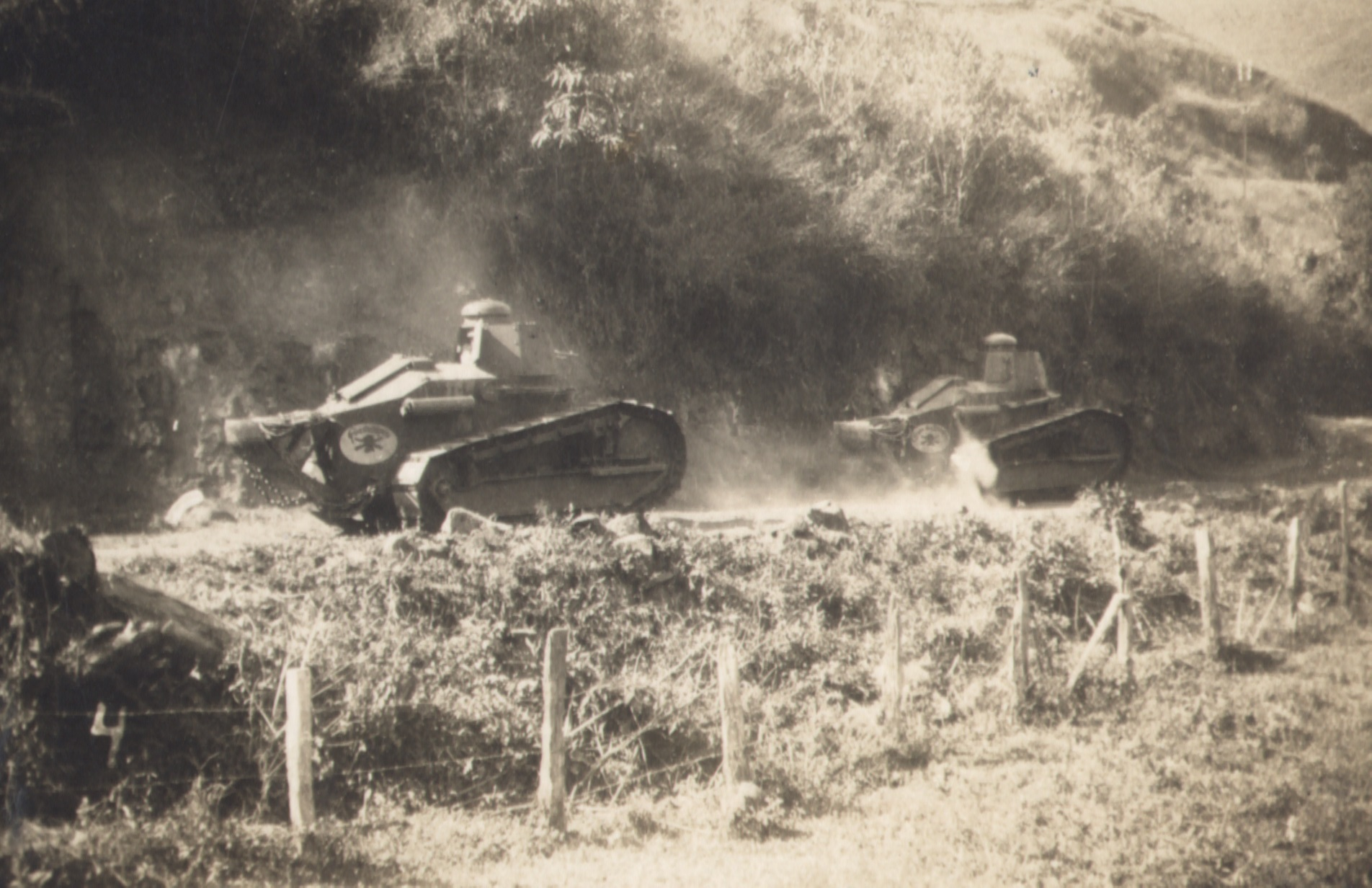
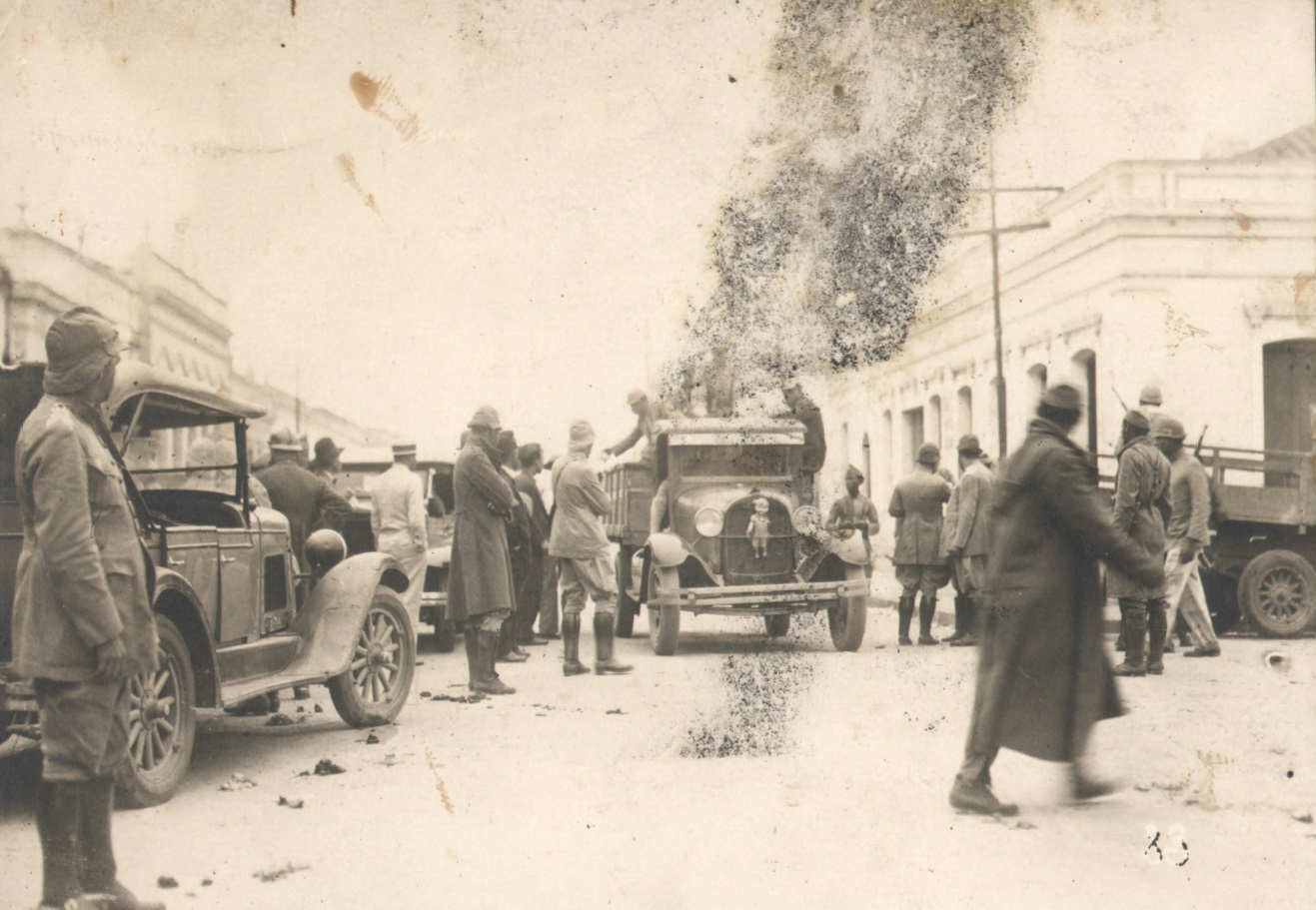
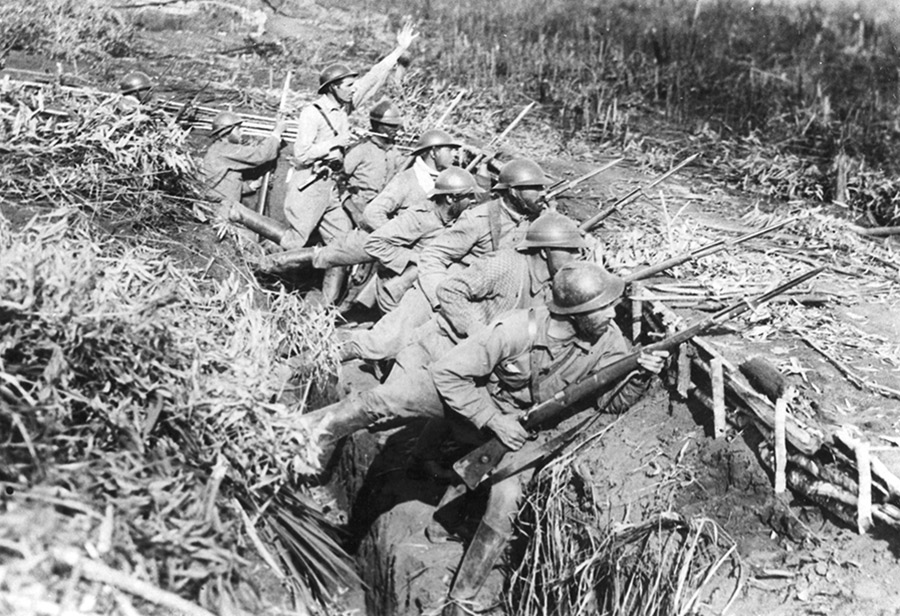
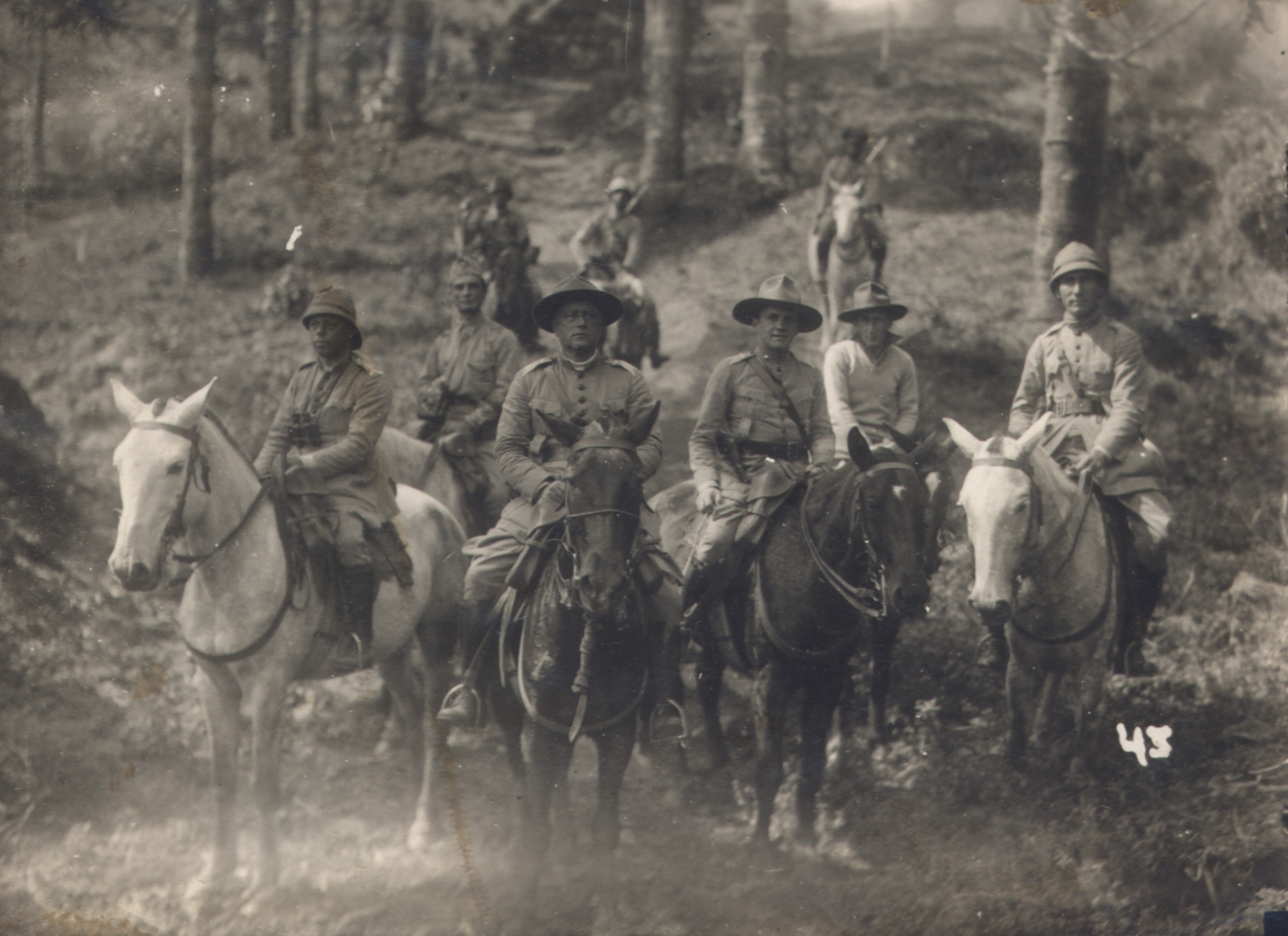
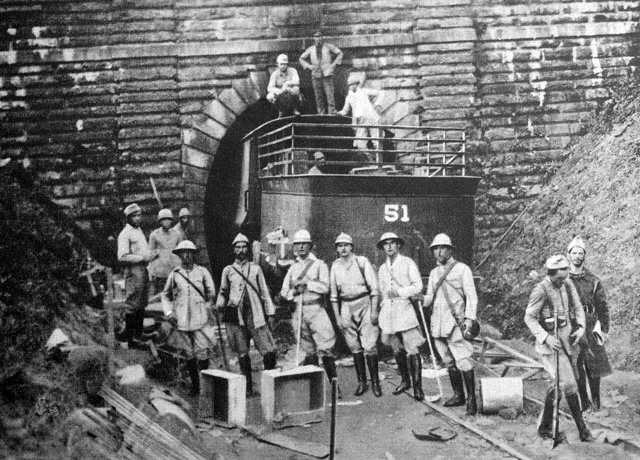
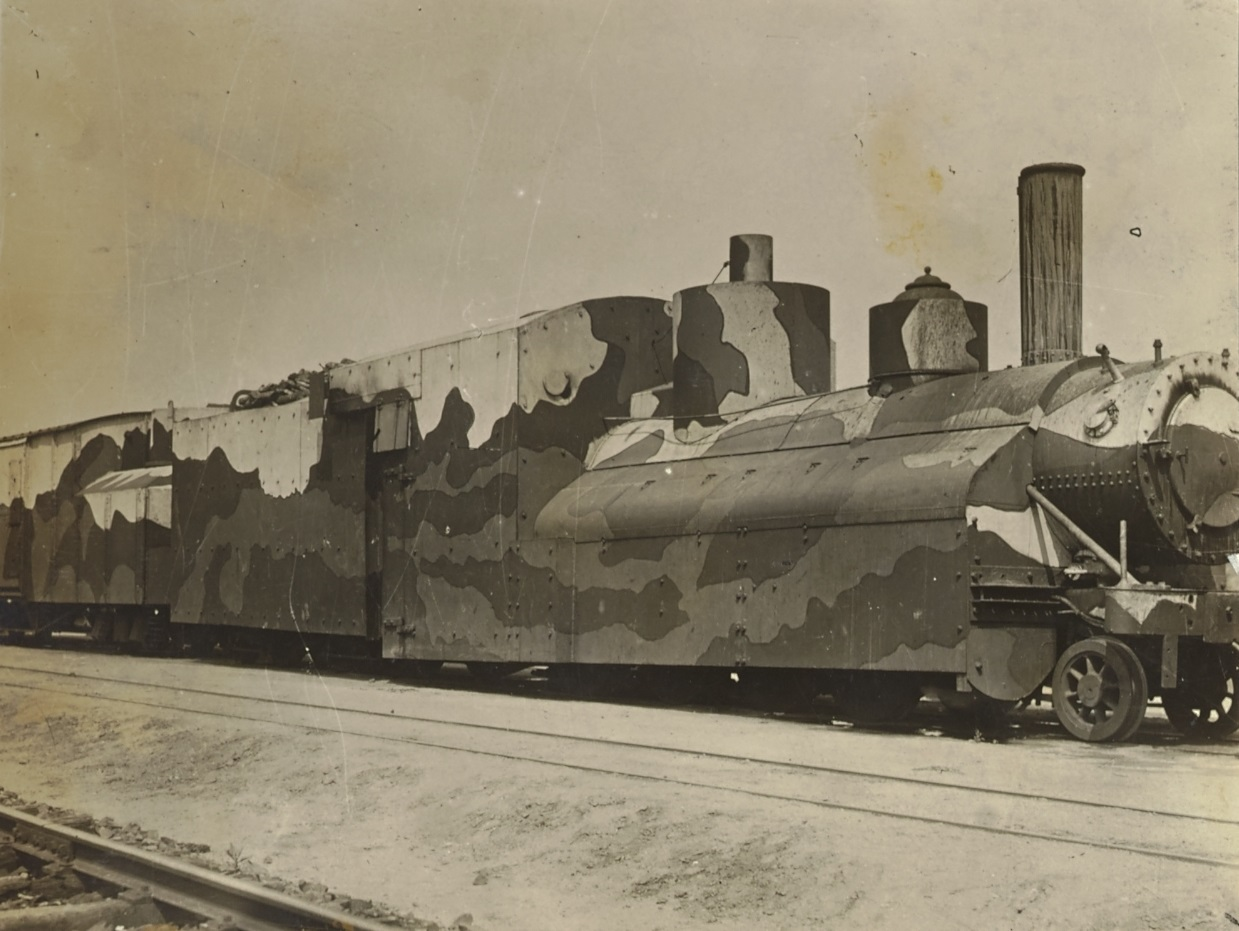
- Top to bottom and left to right: Schneider-Canet 150mm cannon used by São Paulo; Rebel armored flamethrower car; Government Renault FT tanks advancing towards the Itaguaré sector; Minas Gerais troops entering the town of Cruzeiro; São Paulo soldiers entrenched near the southern sector; Colonel Lerí Santos, commander of the Minas Gerais southern brigade; Mantiqueira rail tunnel taken by Minas Gerais troops; An armored train built by the São Paulo insurgents
Date	July 9 – October 2, 1932 (2 months, 3 weeks and 2 days)
Location	São Paulo and some parts of Mato Grosso, Minas Gerais, Rio de Janeiro and Rio Grande do Sul, Brazil
Result	Government and loyalist victory: Brazilian Constitution of 1934

Belligerents
Constitutionalists; São Paulo; São Paulo Police; Army defectors; Maracaju; Gaúcho United Front	Loyalists; Brazilian Army; Brazilian Navy; Public Forces

Commanders and leaders
Pedro de Toledo; Isidoro Dias Lopes; Bertoldo Klinger; Euclides Figueiredo; Júlio de Mesquita; Marcondes Salgado; Artur Bernardes; Vespasiano Martins; Borges de Medeiros	Getúlio Vargas; Góis Monteiro; Valdomiro Lima; Augusto Cardoso; Eduardo Gomes

Strength
40,000 soldiers (police, army and volunteers); 30 armored vehicles 44 artillery 9–10 aircraft	100,000 soldiers (army, navy and police); 90 armored vehicles 250 artillery 58 aircraft 4 warships (naval blockade of the Port of Santos)

Casualties and losses
2,500 estimated dead unknown number of wounded	1,050 estimated dead 3,800 wounded

The Constitutionalist Revolution of 1932 (also known as the Paulista War or Brazilian Civil War) was the uprising by the population of the Brazilian state of São Paulo against the Revolution of 1930, when Getúlio Vargas assumed the nation's presidency. Vargas was supported by the people, the military and the political elite of Minas Gerais, Rio Grande do Sul and Paraíba. The movement grew out of local resentment over Vargas' rule by decree, unbound by a constitution, in a provisional government. The 1930 revolution affected São Paulo by eroding the autonomy that Brazilian states had under the 1891 constitution, preventing the inauguration of São Paulo governor Júlio Prestes (who had been elected president of Brazil in 1930 and overthrowing President Washington Luís, governor of São Paulo from 1920 to 1924. These events marked the end of the First Brazilian Republic.

The revolution's main goal was to press Vargas' provisional government to adopt and abide by a new constitution, since Prestes was prevented from taking office. As the movement developed and resentment of Vargas and his revolutionary government grew deeper, it came to advocate the overthrow of the federal government. It was speculated that one of the revolutionaries' goals was the secession of São Paulo from the Brazilian federation. This scenario was used as a guerrilla tactic by the federal government to turn the rest of Brazil's population against the state of São Paulo, but there is no evidence that the movement's commanders sought separatism.

The uprising began on July 9, 1932, after four protesting students were killed by government troops on May 23. The movement became known as MMDC, named for the first letters of the surnames of the students killed: Martins, Miragaia, Dráusio, and Camargo; a fifth student (Alvarenga) was also shot that night, and died months later. During the following months, the state of São Paulo rebelled against the federal government. Counting on the support of the political elite of two other powerful states, Minas Gerais and Rio Grande do Sul, São Paulo's politicians expected a quick war. The expected support did not materialize, and São Paulo's revolt was overwhelmed by force on October 2, 1932. In 87 days of fighting (July 9 to October 4) there were 934 official deaths, although unofficial estimates report up to 2,200 dead; many cities in the state of São Paulo experienced damage.

In spite of its military defeat, some of the movement's main demands were granted by Vargas: the appointment of a non-military state governor, the election of a Constituent Assembly, and the enactment of a new constitution in 1934. The new constitution was short-lived; in 1937, amidst growing extremism on the left and right, Vargas dissolved the National Congress and enacted another constitution which established the Estado Novo after a coup d'état. July 9 marked the beginning of the revolution, and is a holiday and the most important civic date of the state of São Paulo. Paulistas (as residents of São Paulo are known) consider the Revolution of 1932 the greatest movement of their civic history, and it was the first major revolt against the Vargas government.

== Opposing forces ==
According to Javier García de Gabiola (the first author of a work in English and Spanish about the revolution), the Paulistas initially swayed only one of the Brazilian Army's eight divisions (the 2nd Division, based in São Paulo) and half of a mixed brigade based in southern Mato Grosso. These forces were reinforced by the Força Pública Paulista (the military police of São Paulo state) and MMDC militias. There were 11,000 to 15,000 men at the beginning of the conflict, later joined by thousands of volunteers. According to author Stanley E. Hilton, São Paulo equipped about 40 battalions of volunteers; García de Gabiola identified up to 80 battalions, with about 300 men each. At the end, since the São Paulo state armories had only 15,000 to 29,000 rifles (depending on the source), the Paulistas could never arm more than 35,000 men. The Paulistas had only six million cartridges (failing in their attempts to obtain an additional 500 million), so an army of about 30,000 men fighting for three months was limited to 4.4 cartridges per soldier per day. Brazil equipped approximately 100,000 men, but one-third never went to the front (they were kept to protect the rearguards and as security in the other states) and its numerical superiority was about two to one.

== Aircraft ==
According to García de Gabiola, the Paulistas had three Waco CSOs (two armed only with portable handguns; the third one, armed, was obtained from the federals), two Potez 25TOEs (one, the A-212, downed the first enemy airplane in the Americas before the Chaco War), one NiD. 72 (obtained from the federals), and four Curtiss Falcons acquired during the war. Three were destroyed: a Falcon by anti-aircraft fire, a Potez by accident, and the third was bombed on land. The federals had six airworthy Potez 25TOEs, 19 Waco CSOs, two Nid. 72s (one captured by the rebels), one Amiot 122, three S.55 and two Martin PM-1 seaplanes, and four Vought O2U Corsairs. Of these, two Potezes were destroyed (one downed and the other by accident; both were repaired), four Wacos also destroyed (one accidentally, another by anti-aircraft fire, and two others were bombed from the air by Paulista aircraft); a Martin and a Corsair were accidentally destroyed.

== The conflict ==
The main front was initially the eastern Paraíba Valley that led to Rio de Janeiro, then the capital of Brazil. The 2nd Division revolted and advanced against Rio de Janeiro, but was stopped by the loyalist 1st Division (based there under General Góis Monteiro) on the border between the states of Rio de Janeiro and São Paulo. According to Hilton, Brazilian Army chief of staff Augusto Tasso Fragoso tried to oppose the deployment of the 1st Division in the valley (believing that they were friendly to the rebels). García de Gabiola wrote that he was probably trying to protect the government (based in Rio de Janeiro) from a similar revolt. Monteiro overruled Fragoso, and the 1st Division was placed there in time to block the Paulista advance. He created the East Detachment in the Paraíba, which reached 20,000 to 24,000 men (against 8,000 to 12,000 Paulistas). After three months of trench warfare and despite advancing about 70 kilometres (43 mi), the government forces were still about 150 kilometres (93 mi) from São Paulo when the war ended.

Government forces created the South Detachment in southern São Paulo, consisting of the federal 3rd and 5th Divisions, three cavalry divisions, and the gaucho brigade of Rio Grande do Sul, reaching 18,000 men against 3,000 to 5,000 Paulistas (depending on the date). Federal forces broke through the rebel defensive line in Itararé on July 17, producing the largest advance in the war, but they were still far from São Paulo when the war ended. The Minas Gerais front, active after August 2, was decisive. The 4th Federal Division, based in Minas Gerais, the Minas Gerais police and other states' troops broke through the rebel defensive line in Eleutério (a district of Itapira) on August 26. They advanced about 50 kilometres (31 mi) towards Campinas, adding 18,000 and then 24,000 soldiers against about 7,000 Paulistas. The 4th Division was only 70 kilometres (43 mi) from São Paulo. The Paulistas surrendered on October 2 to General Valdomiro Lima, the uncle of Darci Vargas (Vargas' wife).

The Brazilian Navy designated a naval task force to blockade São Paulo's main port, the Port of Santos, aiming to cut the rebels' only supply line by sea. On July 10, the destroyer Mato Grosso left the port of Rio de Janeiro. The following day, the scout cruiser Rio Grande do Sul was escorted by two destroyers: Pará and Sergipe. To support the mission, Brazilian Naval Aviation sent three Savoia-Marchetti S.55A (numbers 1, 4, and 8) and two Martin PM (numbers 111 and 112) flying boats. These five planes left Galeão on July 12. All were temporarily based at the caves on the island of São Sebastião, near the village of Vila Bela (present-day Ilhabela). The Brazilian Navy also intended to send Vought O2U-2A Corsair scout and observation biplanes to Vila Bela, but Naval Aviation did not trust them to operate as floatplanes from the island's caves and expanded the small airstrip adjacent to the village so that they could operate with landing gear.

== Gallery ==
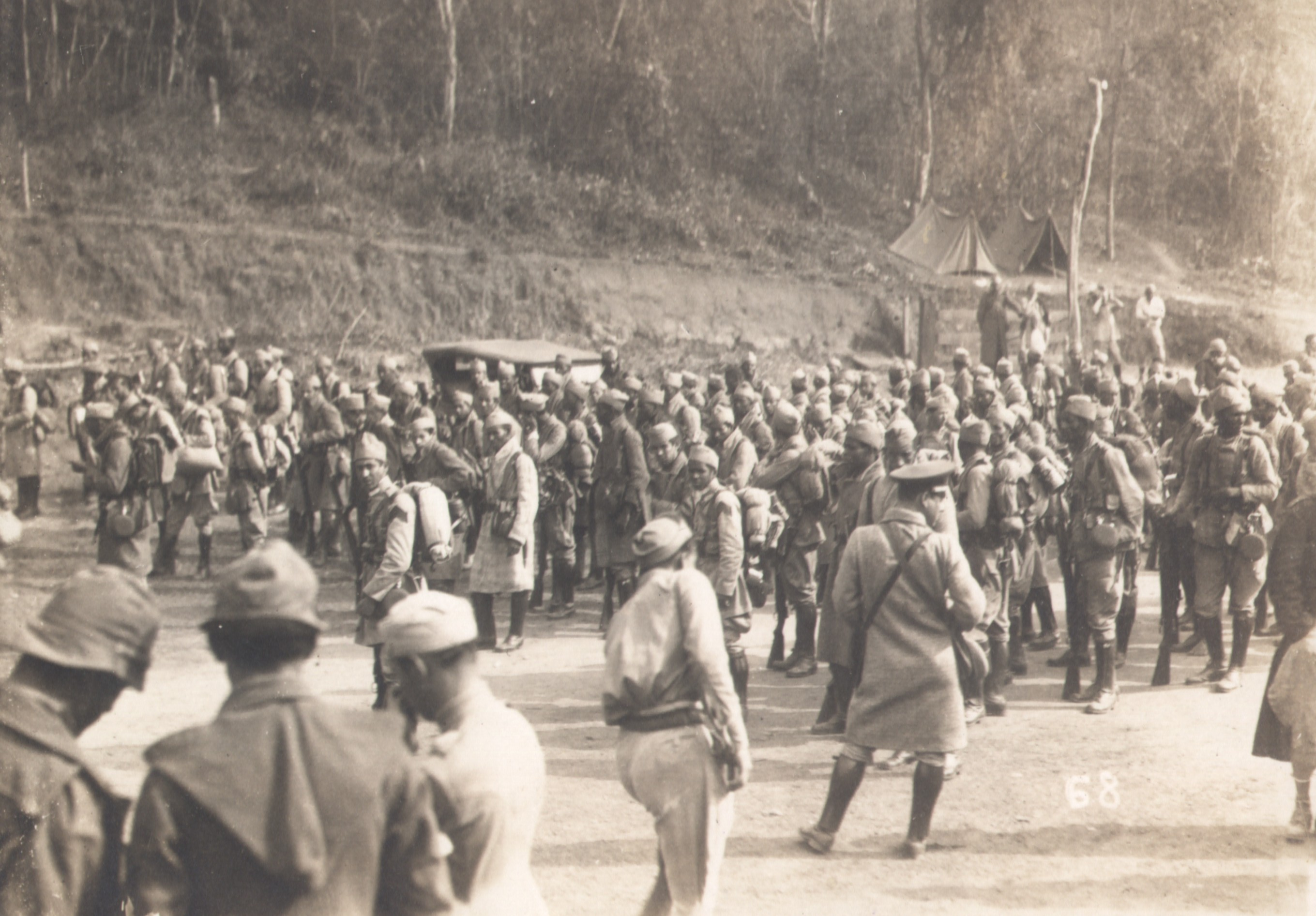
19th Infantry Battalion of the Military Police of Minas Gerais moving forward in battle against the Paulistas

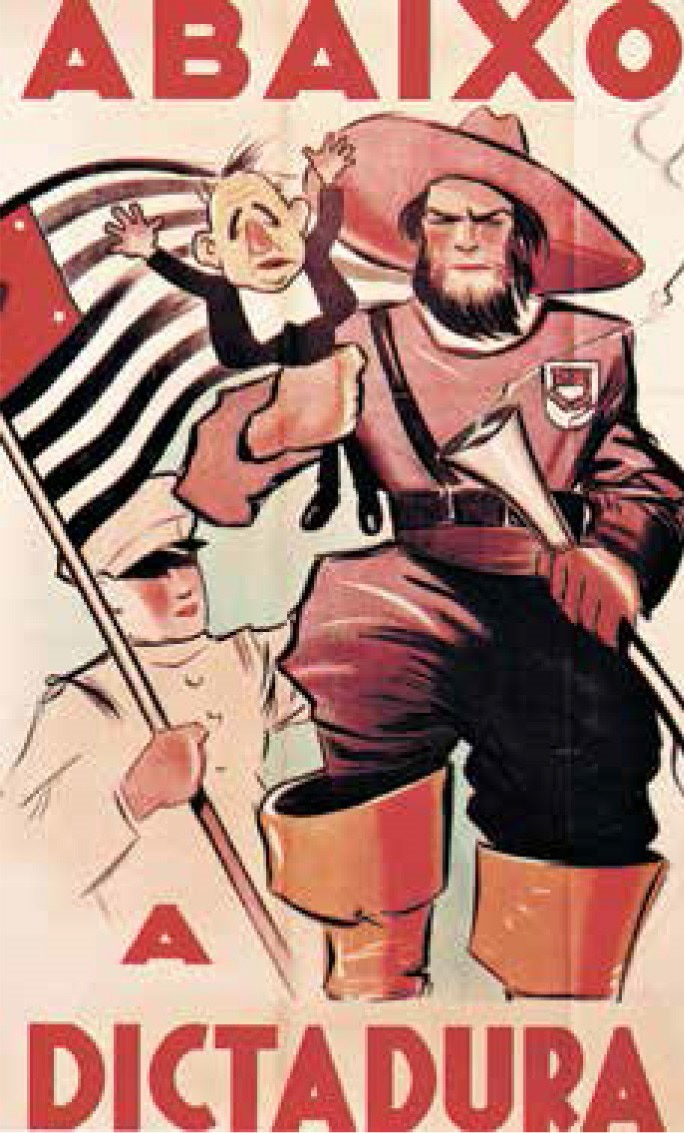
Recruiting poster of a bandeirante holding Getúlio Vargas in his hand

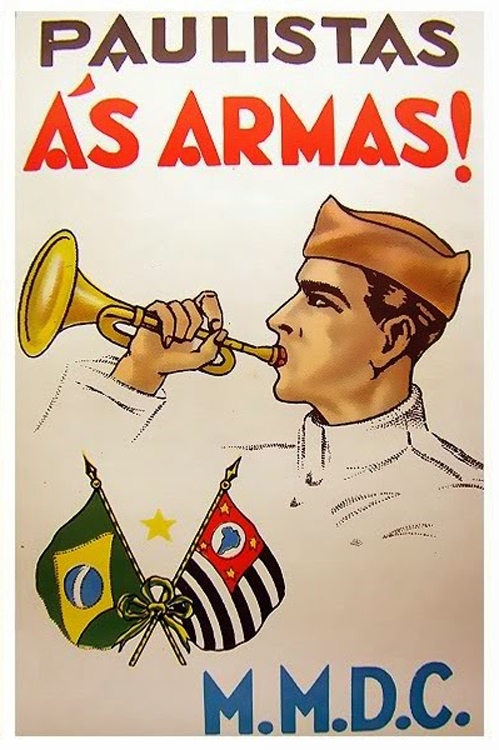
Paulista recruiting poster

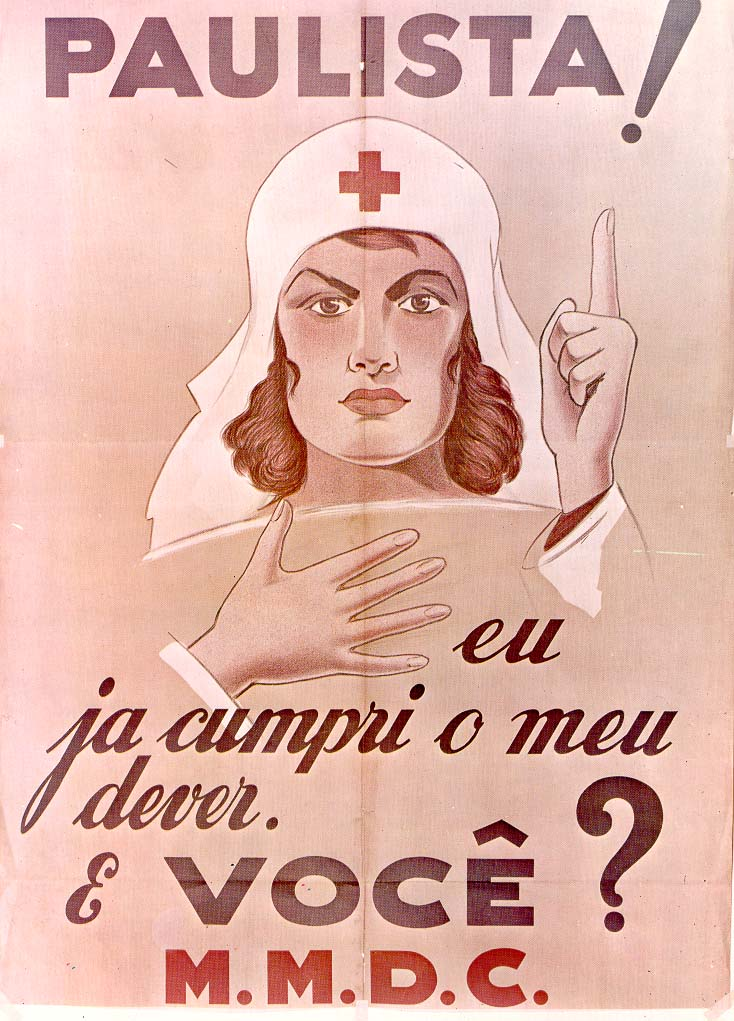
Recruiting poster for Paulista volunteer nurses

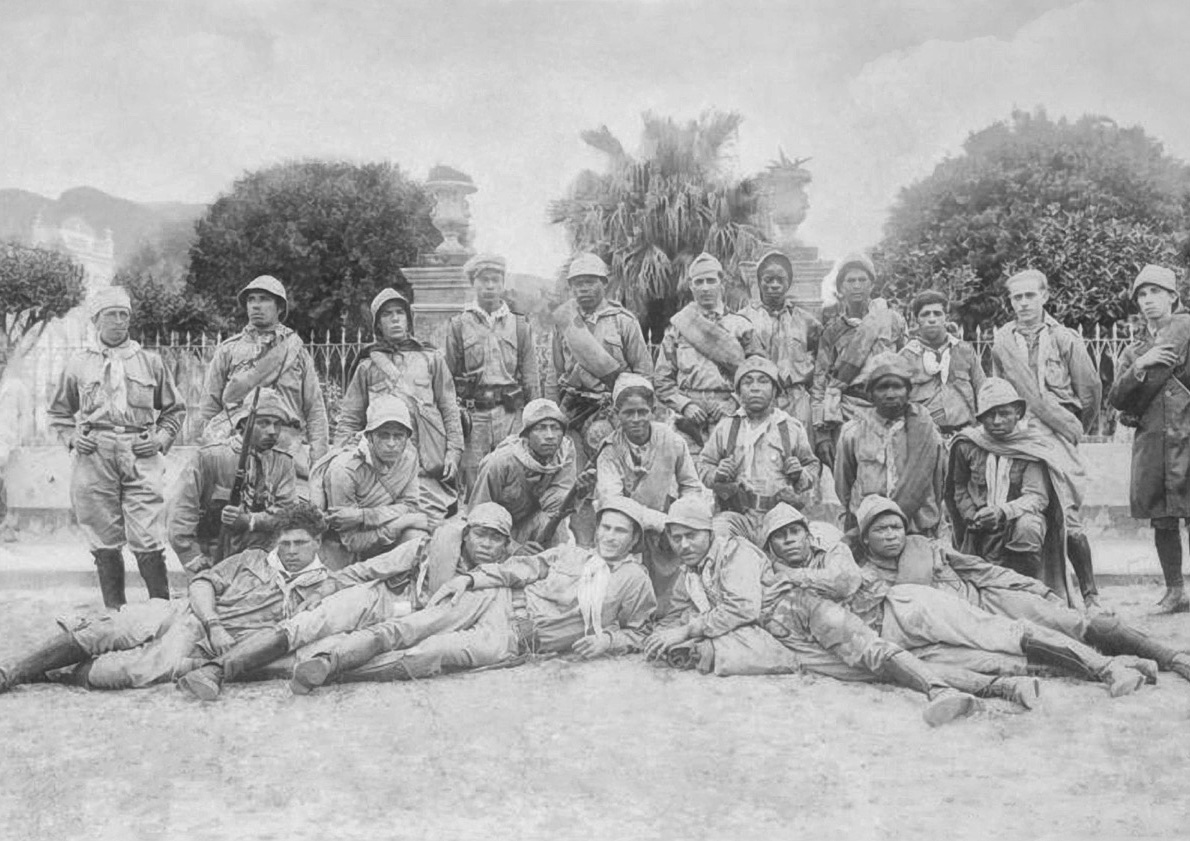
Rebel troops

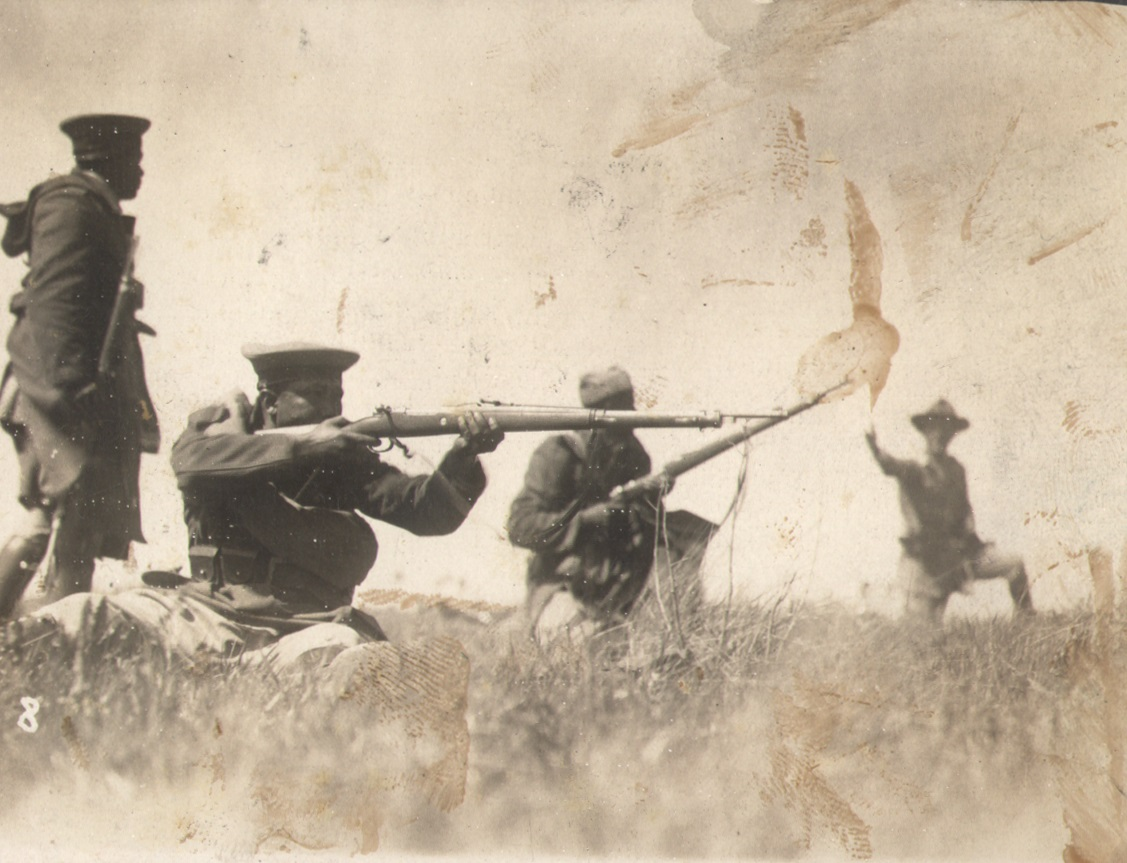
Loyalist soldiers in combat

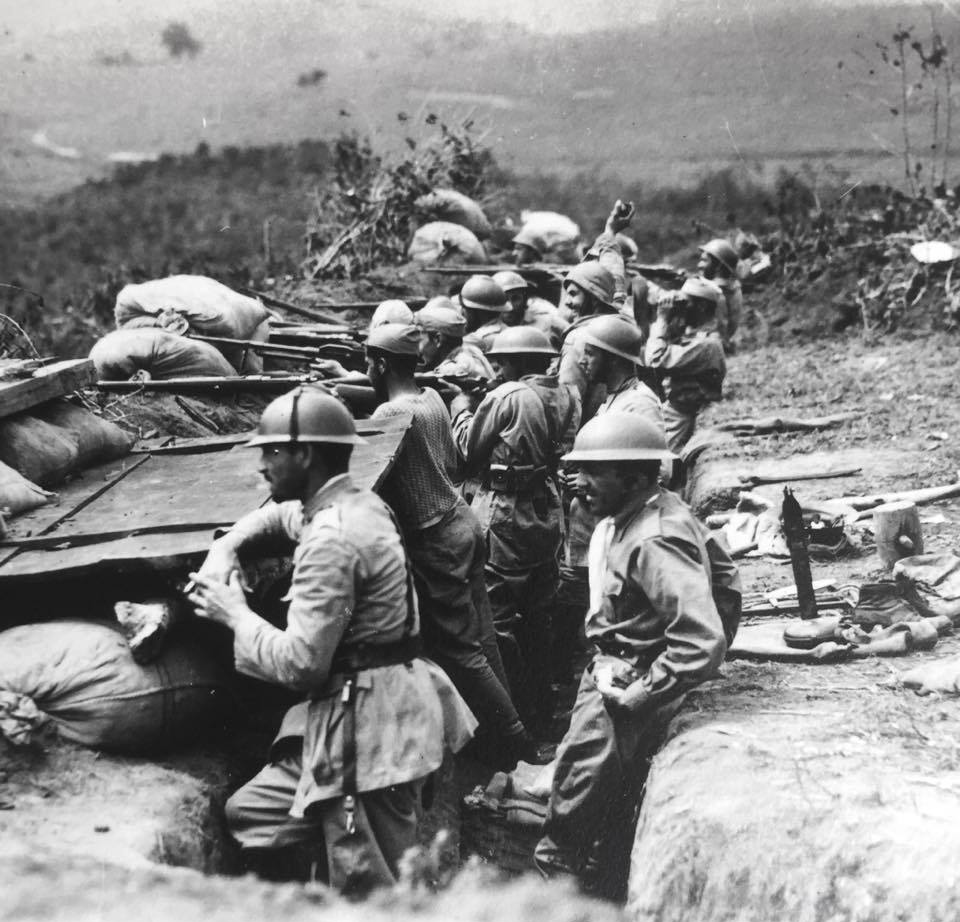
Rebel soldiers on the outskirts of Amparo

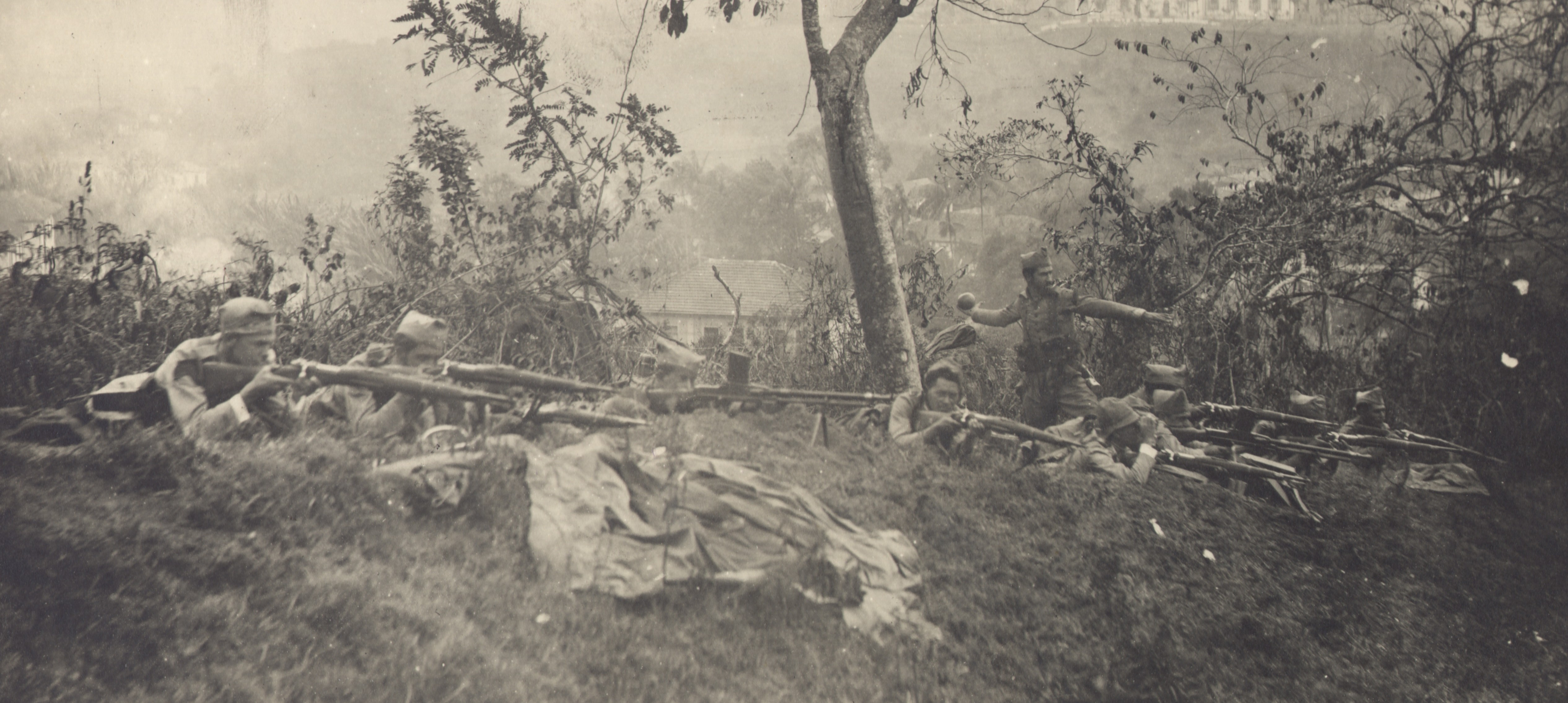
Loyalist soldiers in combat

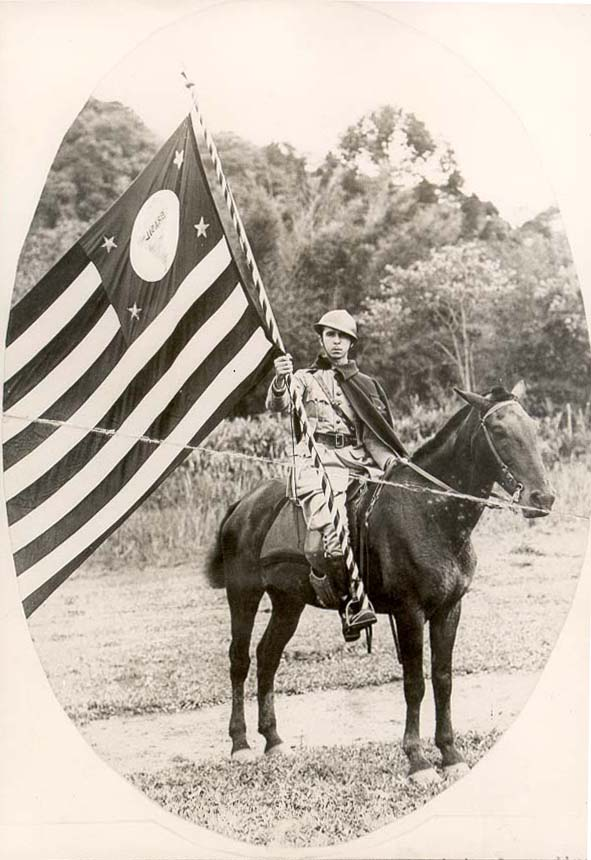
Paulista cavalry volunteer

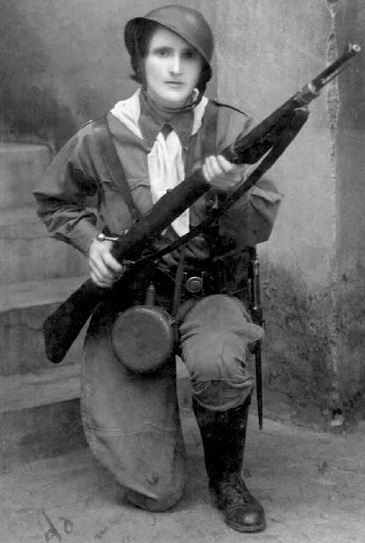
Teacher Maria Sguassábia, who volunteered for the São Paulo trenches

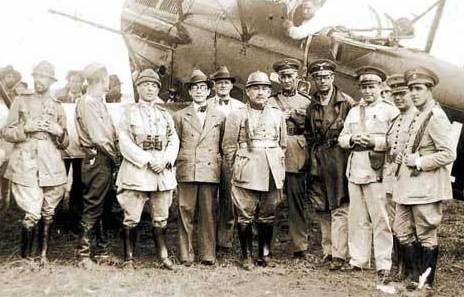
Loyalist troops in September 1932

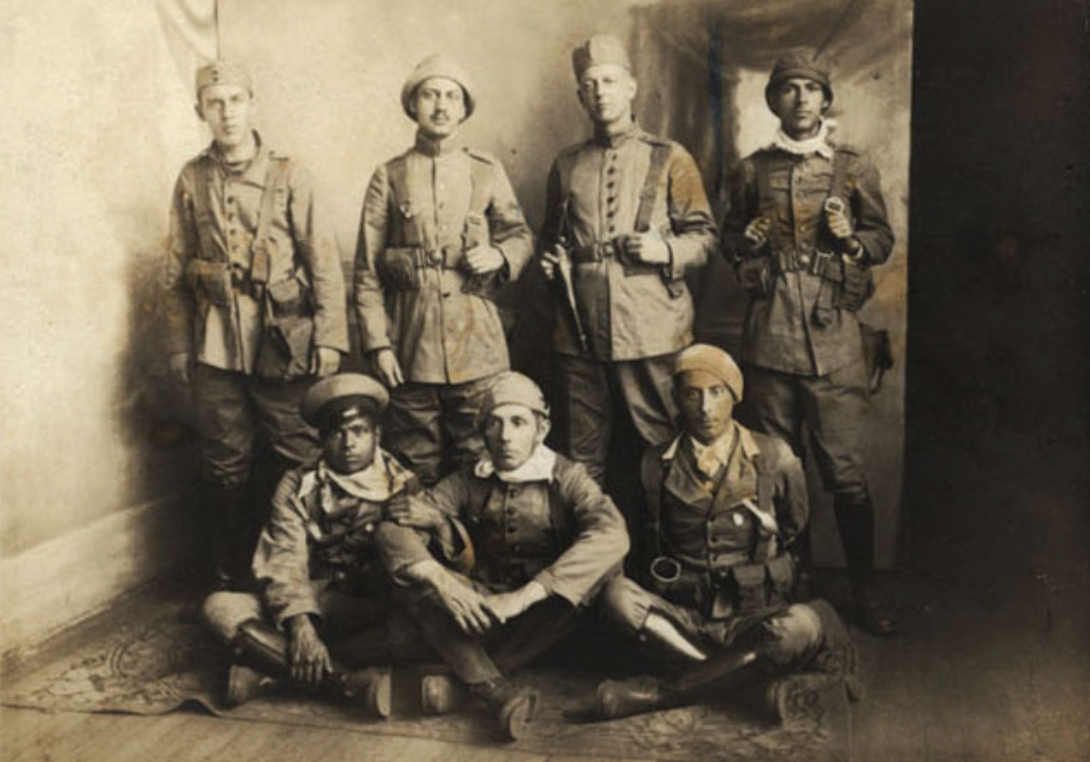
Soldiers from São Paulo, photographed by Claro Jansson in Itararé

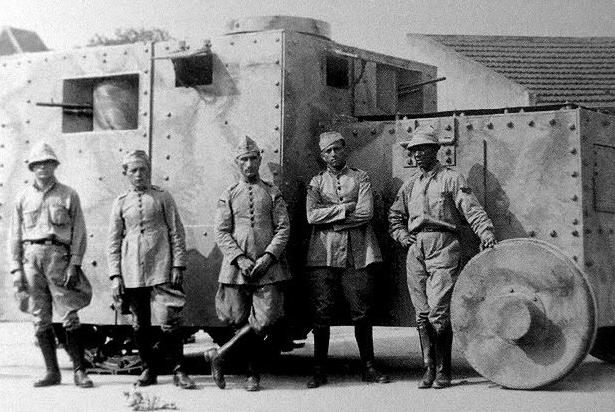
FS-6 armored tractor

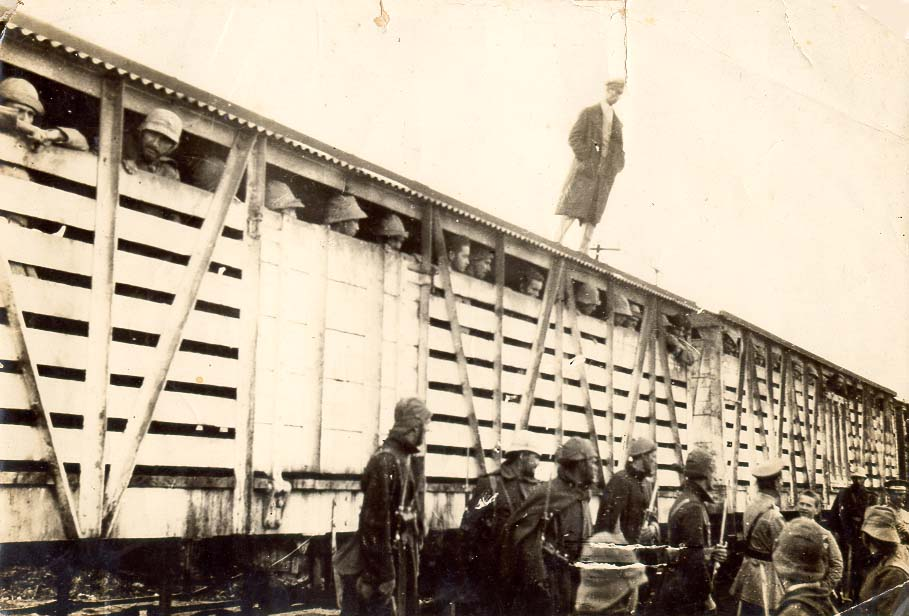
Loyalist train transporting rebel prisoners of war

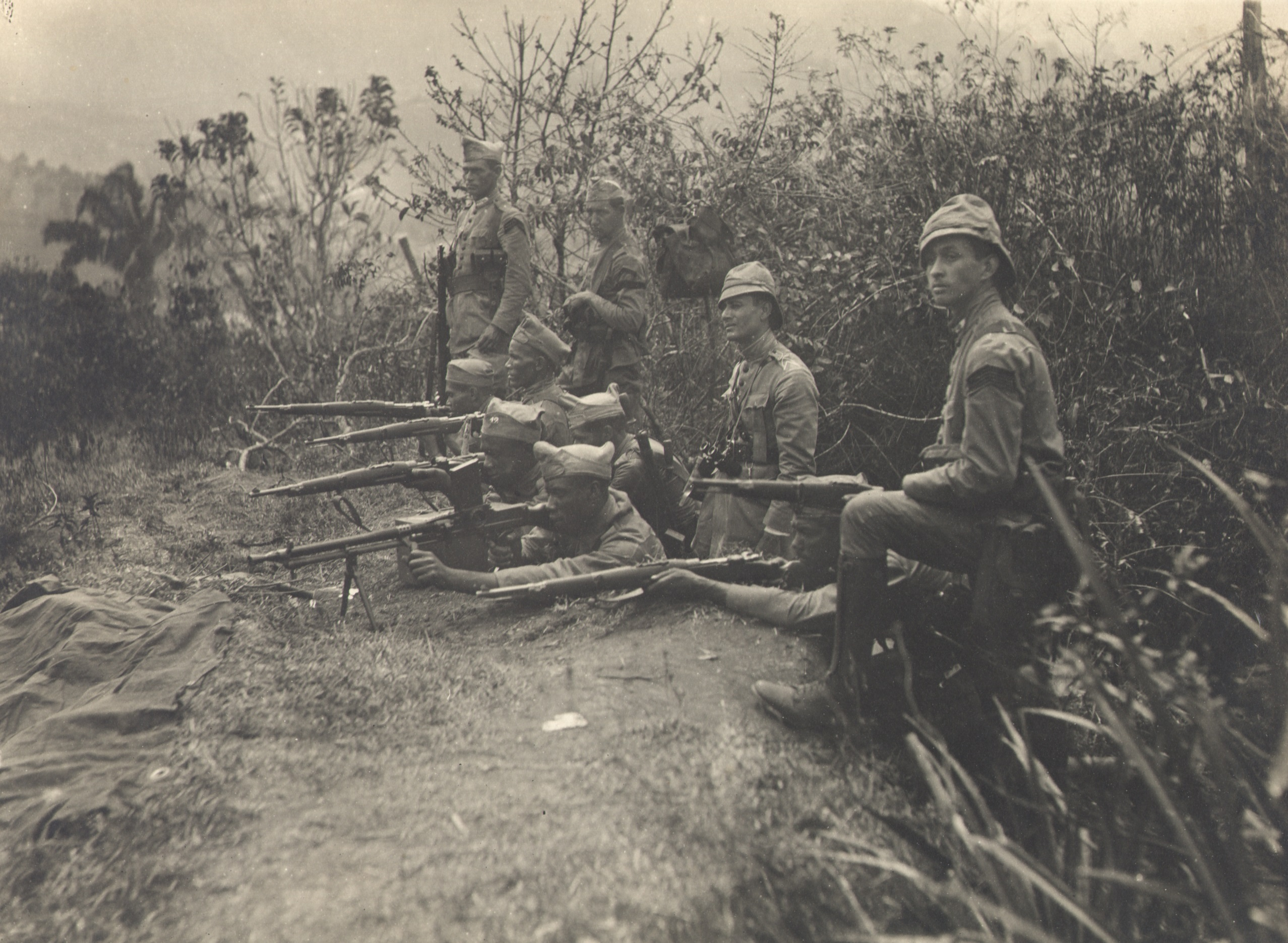
Loyalist soldiers

== See also ==
- List of rebellions and revolutions in Brazil
- São Paulo Revolt of 1924

== Bibliography ==
- Carvalho e Silva, Herculano (1932). A revolucão constitucionalista: subsidios para a sua história, organizados pelo Estado Maior da Força Publica de S. Paulo (in Brazilian Portuguese). Civilização Brasileira Editora.
- García de Gabiola, Javier (2020). The Paulista War Volume 1. Warwick UK: Helion & Company. ISBN 978-1-912866-38-0.
- García de Gabiola, Javier (2021). The Paulista War Volume 2. Warwick UK: Helion & Company. ISBN 978-1-913336-37-0.
- García de Gabiola, Javier (2012). "1932: Sao Paulo en armas". Historia y Vida (in Spanish). No. 535. Barcelona: Prisma Editorial. pp. 60–67. ISSN 0018-2354.
- Hilton, Stanley E. (1982). A guerra civil brasileira: história da Revolução Constitucionalista de 1932 (in Brazilian Portuguese). Editora Nova Fronteira.
