= Augusto Inácio do Espírito Santo Cardoso =

Augusto Cardoso
- Augusto Inácio do Espírito Santo Cardoso
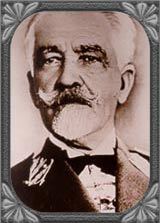
- Born: May 31, 1867; Goiás, Brazil
- Died: September 23, 1947 (aged 80); Rio de Janeiro, Rio de Janeiro, Brazil
- Education: Praia Vermelha Military School
- Military career
- Allegiance: Empire of Brazil; First Brazilian Republic; Vargas Era
- Branch: Imperial Brazilian Army; Brazilian Army
- Service years: 1884 – 1938
- Rank: Brigadier General
- Conflicts: Tenente revolts Constitutionalist Revolution

Augusto Ignácio do Espírito Santo Cardoso (1867-1947) was a Brazilian general who was a primary commander during the Constitutionalist Revolution that served for the Second Brazilian Republic.

== Biography ==
Augusto was the father of General Dulcídio do Espírito Santo Cardoso and Marshal Ciro do Espírito Santo Cardoso, he was brother of General Joaquim Ignácio Baptista Cardoso and great-uncle of former President Fernando Henrique Cardoso.

He enlisted in the Imperial Brazilian Army on 1884 in the cavalry course at the Praia Vermelha Military School and became an ensign in 1890. Afterwards, under the command of Major Marciano de Magalhães, he marched on foot to the neighborhood from Botafogo and, from there in donkey-drawn trams, to Campo de Santana, along with other companions to overthrow the Cabinet of the Viscount of Ouro Preto, following the Proclamation of the Republic in 1889. He was promoted to captain in 1906, major in 1912, lieutenant colonel in 1917 and to a full colonel in 1919. He was then given command of the 4th Cavalry Regiment and stationed at Rio Grande do Sul and Rio de Janeiro before the Tenente revolts broke out while he was at Três Corações and help quell the revolts and later took residence there.

He was then made Minister of War and Brigadier General by Getúlio Vargas, in the midst of the crisis that preceded the Constitutionalist Revolution of 1932, remaining in office until 1934.

Cardoso retired on July 1, 1938, with about 44 years of service before dying at Rio de Janeiro on September 23, 1947.
