= Battle of Quatiguá =

Battle of Quatigá
- Part of the Revolution of 1930
- Loyalist trench in Quatiguá
Date	12–13 October 1930
Location	Quatiguá, Paraná, Brazil
Result	Revolutionary victory

Belligerents
Revolutionaries; Brazilian Army; Rio Grande do Sul Police	Loyalists; Brazilian Army; São Paulo Police; Volunteers

Commanders and leaders
Alcides Etchegoyen	José Sandoval

The Battle of Quatiguá, during the Brazilian Revolution of 1930, pitted loyalists faithful to the government of Washington Luís against revolutionaries supporting Getúlio Vargas. In one of the conflict's major engagements, revolutionaries from the Army and the Military Brigade of Rio Grande do Sul defeated loyalists from the Army and the Public Force of São Paulo at the Quatiguá railway station, located on the border between São Paulo and Paraná. Following minor skirmishes at Colônia Mineira and Afonso Camargo, the revolutionaries repelled a loyalist offensive at Quatiguá on 12–13 October and secured the rest of the region for the remainder of the revolution.

Quatiguá formed a flank of the main war effort at Itararé and would have paved the way for a revolutionary offensive toward Bauru, in São Paulo. The commanders in the sector were Alcides Etchegoyen, a revolutionary, and the loyalist José Sandoval de Figueiredo. Although the loyalists were on the defensive along the entire border, they decided to attack the revolutionary vanguard—a cavalry squadron from the Military Brigade—which was awaiting reinforcements in Quatiguá. Initially holding a numerical advantage on the afternoon of the 12th, they surrounded the station but were repelled upon the arrival of the rest of Etchegoyen's detachment. The combat was modern in nature, involving trenches, machine guns, and artillery.

During their retreat on 13 October, the Loyalists destroyed bridges and ferries along the border. Many were captured and taken prisoner, along with large stockpiles of ammunition. The Public Force of São Paulo was losing its reputation for invincibility. The revolutionaries drove the remaining Loyalists out of Paraná and prepared for a general offensive on the 25th, but this was halted by the fall of the Brazilian government and the victory of the Revolution.

== Operational background ==
Map of forces along the Ourinhos–Itararé sector

A civil-military insurrection against Washington Luís, the President of Brazil, began in Rio Grande do Sul, Minas Gerais, and Paraíba between 3 and 4 October 1930. The revolution rapidly took control of the south and advanced toward the federal capital, reaching the border between Paraná and São Paulo—the latter being the federal government's main stronghold. In the 5th Military Region, comprising Paraná and Santa Catarina, the Army and the Public Force of Paraná joined the movement. On 5 October, General Mário Tourinho assumed control of the Paraná state government. Troops from Rio Grande do Sul and Santa Catarina entered the state and joined forces with the Paraná troops for the offensive toward São Paulo.

The leader of the revolution, Getúlio Vargas, established his headquarters in Ponta Grossa on 16 October. On the Paraná-São Paulo border, the revolutionaries clashed with loyalist forces—comprising Army units from São Paulo and Rio de Janeiro, the Public Force of São Paulo (FPESP), and civilian volunteers ("legionnaires"). There were four battlefronts: Quatiguá, Sengés-Itararé, Capela da Ribeira, and Cananeia. Lacking the manpower for an offensive, the loyalists focused solely on halting the revolutionary advance. For both sides, Itararé was the center of gravity. The São Paulo-Rio Grande Railway ran through the area, offering the fastest route to transport the largest possible force to São Paulo. The Ourinhos-Quatiguá and Ribeira fronts, being less heavily defended, served to protect Itararé's flanks.

In Jaguariaíva, the railway branched to the right toward Itararé and to the left toward Colônia Mineira (present-day Joaquim Távora)—located in the Norte Pioneiro region, or along the Paranapanema Branch, where Quatiguá is situated. By crossing the Paranapanema River at Ribeirão Claro, or the Itararé River at Porto Maria Ferreira or Carlópolis, one could travel from the Ourinhos region to the railway junctions of Bauru and Botucatu. From there, the revolutionaries envisioned linking up with their allies in Minas Gerais.

Coffee growers in the Norte Pioneiro region were enthusiastic supporters of the Liberal Alliance and of Getúlio Vargas in the 1930 election. Ribeirão Claro was a Vargas stronghold. The Revolution found moral, political, and material support among the coffee growers of Ribeirão Claro, Jacarezinho, Santo Antônio da Platina, and Cambará. In Colônia Mineira, Liberal Alliance leader Paulo Chueiri arrested political bosses and government officials who might pose a threat to the revolution. In Cambará, a shootout resulted in fatalities. In Santo Antônio da Platina, the engineer and coffee grower Coriolano de Lima was killed. In Jaguariaíva, Liberal Alliance supporters from Jacarezinho attacked the police detachment and the town hall.

== Opposing forces ==
General Staff of Commander Trajano Marinho (with a mustache)

Even before the revolution, the 1st Squadron of the 2nd Cavalry Regiment of the Military Brigade of Rio Grande do Sul, based in Santana do Livramento, was deployed to Marcelino Ramos, on the border with Santa Catarina. This unit was to serve as the vanguard of the revolutionary offensive under the command of Captain Trajano Marinho. On 3 October, the squadron was placed under the command of General Miguel Costa. Without significant difficulty, (Note: The first train, carrying Lieutenant Gumercindo Duarte's platoon and 22 civilians, departed for Santa Catarina at 13:30. At 02:30 on 4 October, it arrived at the station in Herval, Santa Catarina, where it engaged in a firefight with and captured a detachment of the Public Force of Santa Catarina. Arms and ammunition were scarce, so Captain Marinho requisitioned supplies from Public Force depots and local political leaders. To avoid arousing the curiosity of railway stationmasters, Marinho told them the train was transporting pigs.) the column entered Paraná on the 5th. On the 9th, it was reinforced by a contingent from the Municipal Guard of Passo Fundo and other elements, forming a Provisional Cavalry Corps led by Captain Marinho.

The Marinho squadron formed the vanguard of Colonel Alcides Etchegoyen’s detachment, which was composed of units from the Army and the Military Brigade. The main body of the detachment traveled in nine heavy, slow-moving train convoys. It consisted of three light infantry battalions and a mixed group comprising one light infantry battalion, a battery from the 6th Horse Artillery Regiment (6.º RAM) based in Cruz Alta, and three heavy machine-gun companies. The light infantry battalions were the 1st (elements of the Military Brigade and the 9th Light Infantry Battalion from Caxias, under Major Alcides de Araujo), the 2nd (elements of the 1st Battalion of the 7th Infantry Regiment from Santa Maria, under Colonel Nestor da Silva Soares), and the 3rd (elements of the 1st Battalion of the 8th Infantry Regiment from Passo Fundo, under Lieutenant Colonel Olímpio dos Santos Rosa). (Note: The numbering of these battalions was temporary and bore no relation to the battalions of the same name in Rio de Janeiro and Espírito Santo.) At Quatiguá, the detachment would deploy eight 75mm cannons.

The Etchegoyen detachment operated in the region stretching from Cambará to Jaguariaíva, confronting a loyalist detachment active between Salto Grande and Jacarezinho under the command of Public Force Colonel José Sandoval de Figueiredo. The loyalist forces amounted to the equivalent of two battalions: four hundred soldiers from the Public Force of São Paulo—comprising a squadron from the 2nd Cavalry Regiment and two infantry companies—along with the Army's 1st Company of the 4th Battalion (4º BC), consisting of 110 soldiers, and 160 legionnaires (civilians). The Army troops came from Quitaúna, while the civilians were recruited by Federal Deputy Ataliba Leonel. The total number of soldiers in Quatiguá is estimated at 3,500, including an initial force of 2,014 in the Etchegoyen Detachment.

== Norte Pioneiro front ==
The first Rio Grande do Sul forces to reach the border region were those of the Marinho Squadron. They advanced along the railway line on foot, without their horses. On 7 October, the vanguard exchanged fire with the 5th Divisional Cavalry Regiment (RCD)—a loyalist Army unit—between the Jaguariaíva and Cachoeira stations. The loyalists withdrew when the column halted to return fire. On the 8th, the Marinho Squadron arrived at Colônia Mineira, installed new municipal authorities, and repaired the railway and telegraph lines, which had been sabotaged by the loyalists. The following day, the unit entered Afonso Camargo (present-day Siqueira Campos), where it was attacked at 14:00 by a company of the Public Force of São Paulo—a force that was "superior in numbers and well-equipped." The attackers withdrew after one hour, having suffered eleven dead and five wounded, with 35 taken prisoner, according to Captain Marinho's report.

Shootouts continued in Afonso Camargo on the 10th and 11th. According to his report, Captain Marinho withdrew to Quatiguá, "given the information that the enemy was to receive reinforcements and considering my own situation—being without support and low on ammunition." At Colônia Mineira, there was a risk of encirclement. Quatiguá offered a more advantageous defensive position, thanks to the proximity of a mountain ridge and steep cliffs, from where the rest of the Etchegoyen detachment could be awaited. The newspaper Estado de S. Paulo proclaimed a Loyalist victory: "In Jacarezinho, Paraná, the column of patriots stationed there under the command of Major Agnelo de Souza inflicted a decisive defeat on the rebels who were preparing to attack it, advancing as far as Colônia Mineira."

=== Loyalist attack in Quatiguá ===
On 12 October, the Marinho squadron was awaiting reinforcements in Quatiguá. The 1st BC, the detachment's vanguard, carefully disembarked one kilometer before the station and proceeded along the railway line. At 06:30, they were informed—possibly by Democratic Party cells—of the arrival of eighty trucks carrying São Paulo troops in Afonso Camargo. Other loyalist forces were stationed in Santo Antônio da Platina, Ribeirão Claro, Jacarezinho, and Carlópolis.

Some reinforcements were already in position when the loyalists attacked at 16:00 or 17:00. The fighting dragged on into the night, lasting until 11:00 the following day. It bore the characteristics of modern warfare, featuring trenches, machine guns, mortars, grenades, and artillery batteries directed via telegraph from the rear. Machine guns were mounted on the roof of the railway depot, and railway staff served as observers, guides, and combatants. According to Roberto Bondarik, it was "one of the fiercest battles of the 1930 Revolution, surpassing even those on the Sengés front." Historian Ruy Christovam Wachowicz, from Paraná, described Quatiguá as the "major battle of the 1930 Revolution." Both sides received reinforcements.

Captain Marinho's report estimated a force of six hundred defenders and 1,200 attackers during this initial phase. Lieutenant Anápio Barcelos Feio, from Rio Grande do Sul, estimated the opposing force at 1,600 men. The Loyalists held the numerical advantage and attacked in a crescent formation around the Quatiguá station. According to Vanderley Verás, a revolutionary, "The gunfire intensified against their lines. Their firepower was formidable! Their heavy machine guns, firing in successive bursts, raked the small, completely open hamlet, which consisted of small, widely spaced houses. Our platoons at the front returned the besiegers' fire with admirable fearlessness."

=== Counterattack and withdrawal ===
With the arrival of the bulk of the Etchegoyen detachment, the revolutionaries launched a counterattack at 05:00 on 13 October. The 6th RAM's artillery was positioned in a coffee plantation on the flank of the Public Force of São Paulo. Due to a lack of centralized command between the legalist Army and Public Force columns—which were advancing along separate roads—the revolutionaries managed to envelop the São Paulo force led by Captain Custódio Rodrigues de Moraes. By 10:00, the enemy was in flight. According to Lieutenant Anápio Barcelos Feio,

At 05:30 on 13 October of the current year, I began [...] the approach march along the northern flank at a location known as Quatiguá—on the border between Paraná and São Paulo. Upon arriving there with my company—specifically the fourth platoon—and after ascending a very steep slope spanning four hundred meters, we were suddenly attacked by forces from the São Paulo police and the Army's 4th Light Infantry Battalion. A battle ensued involving the three aforementioned platoons, which sought, in successive maneuvers, to engage the enemy as closely as possible. The fighting concluded only at 10:00 with the enemy's complete defeat. Following this defeat, small pockets of resistance remained; these were eliminated as the fighting continued until 11:30 that same day.

According to Colonel Etchegoyen's account,

Their formation disintegrated; panic seized their ranks, giving way to disorder and confusion. Nothing could halt those terror-stricken troops, whose sole thought was flight—a flight cut short by the fire of our heavy machine guns, which mowed them down en masse. The population of the towns and villages along the Quatiguá–Jacarezinho railway line bore witness to the utter disarray and demoralization of the fleeing enemy forces; gripped by terror and traveling in trucks, the troops used gasoline to torch bridges and culverts along the route to hinder our pursuit, while barbarically dynamiting the bridges spanning the Paranapanema River and setting fire to every raft, skiff, and canoe at the river's various crossings, ultimately abandoning the State of Paraná.

The loyalist forces continued their retreat toward Carlópolis. Amidst the woods and coffee plantations, the 7th Infantry Regiment caught up with the São Paulo cavalry squadron on what is now the PR-092 highway. One hundred and forty loyalists were captured after their trucks ran out of fuel; among them were three lieutenants from the Public Force, one from the Army, and Captain Custódio, who had sustained a gunshot wound. The revolutionaries also seized war materiel, weaponry, and ammunition—the latter amounting to ten percent of the revolutionary forces' total stockpiles. The pursuit continued. The Rio Grande do Sul forces requisitioned every available horse—even those belonging to milkmen, bakers, and funeral homes—but were unable to keep pace with the rest of the São Paulo troops, who were motorized.

On 18 October, the United States Consul General in São Paulo reported the battle to the Secretary of State: "Government column advancing from Ourinhos seriously defeated a few days ago. Government now on the defensive. São Paulo-Paraná railway transporting requisitioned goods, and all bridges destroyed by the government. Entire São Paulo-Rio Grande do Sul railway cooperating with revolutionaries."

=== Later actions ===
Rio Grande do Sul revolutionaries in Jacarezinho after the combat in Quatiguá

The revolutionaries occupied the remainder of the Norte Pioneiro region, driving out remaining loyalist forces. By 15 or 16 October, they had reached Carlópolis, and on 19 October, they installed officials in Ribeirão Claro and Jacarezinho; in the latter town, the physician Gustavo Lessa was appointed "Provisional Municipal Governor," and Major Guimar de Assis Moreira became the police chief. Reconnaissance along the banks of the Itararé River continued as far as Porto Maria Ferreira. The Marinho Squadron remained in Quatiguá as a security force until the 17th, when it joined the reconnaissance operation. On the opposite bank of the Itararé River, loyalist troops were positioned three kilometers from Carlópolis. On the 18th, a cavalry picket engaged in a firefight but withdrew in the face of the enemy's superior strength.

The general offensive against São Paulo was scheduled for noon on 25 October. A cavalry detachment was assembling at Castro to advance on Bauru. Loyalist forces had destroyed the São Paulo-Paraná railway bridge—connecting the Sorocabana railway to the Parananema branch line—as well as the road suspension bridge at Ribeirão Claro and bridges over the Paranapanema River. Barges were constructed for crossing the Itararé River.

On the 24th, the Marinho Squadron began its march closer to the positions, and the following day it shifted to a combat march. The São Paulo bank of the river was undefended, and the loyalist forces had withdrawn to Fartura and Piraju. A military coup in Rio de Janeiro deposed Washington Luís and ordered an end to the fighting. On 9 November, the Marinho Squadron arrived in Sorocaba, from where it was summoned to São Paulo by Miguel Costa. He issued direct orders for the disbanding of the detachments, and the Rio Grande do Sul forces returned to their home state.

== Aftermath ==
Quatiguá marked the revolutionaries' first significant victory in the sector and shattered the image of invincibility surrounding the Public Force of São Paulo. The São Paulo troops retreated in disarray, while the revolutionaries demonstrated their logistical capabilities, organization, and discipline. Vargas himself visited the loyalist prisoners to gauge the views of the government's defenders.

Casualties are difficult to quantify. Newspapers and reports from the time mention between twenty and two hundred deaths, and Colonel Etchegoyen's report records five hundred loyalist casualties. Captain Marinho compiled a list of the dead, wounded, and missing from his squadron, but these records were not found in the Military Brigade Archive in 1987. Marinho's squadron recorded three dead, eleven wounded, and four missing at Quatiguá. Lieutenant Anápio Feio's company suffered two dead and two wounded.

In 2011, Professor Roberto Bondarik noted the absence of detailed academic studies regarding the events in the Norte Pioneiro in 1930. He speculates that news of the defeat influenced generals and admirals in Rio de Janeiro to oust Washington Luís and declare the Revolution of 1930 at an end.
