= Battle of Itararé =

Battle of the Revolution of 1930 in Brazil

- Part of the Revolution of 1930
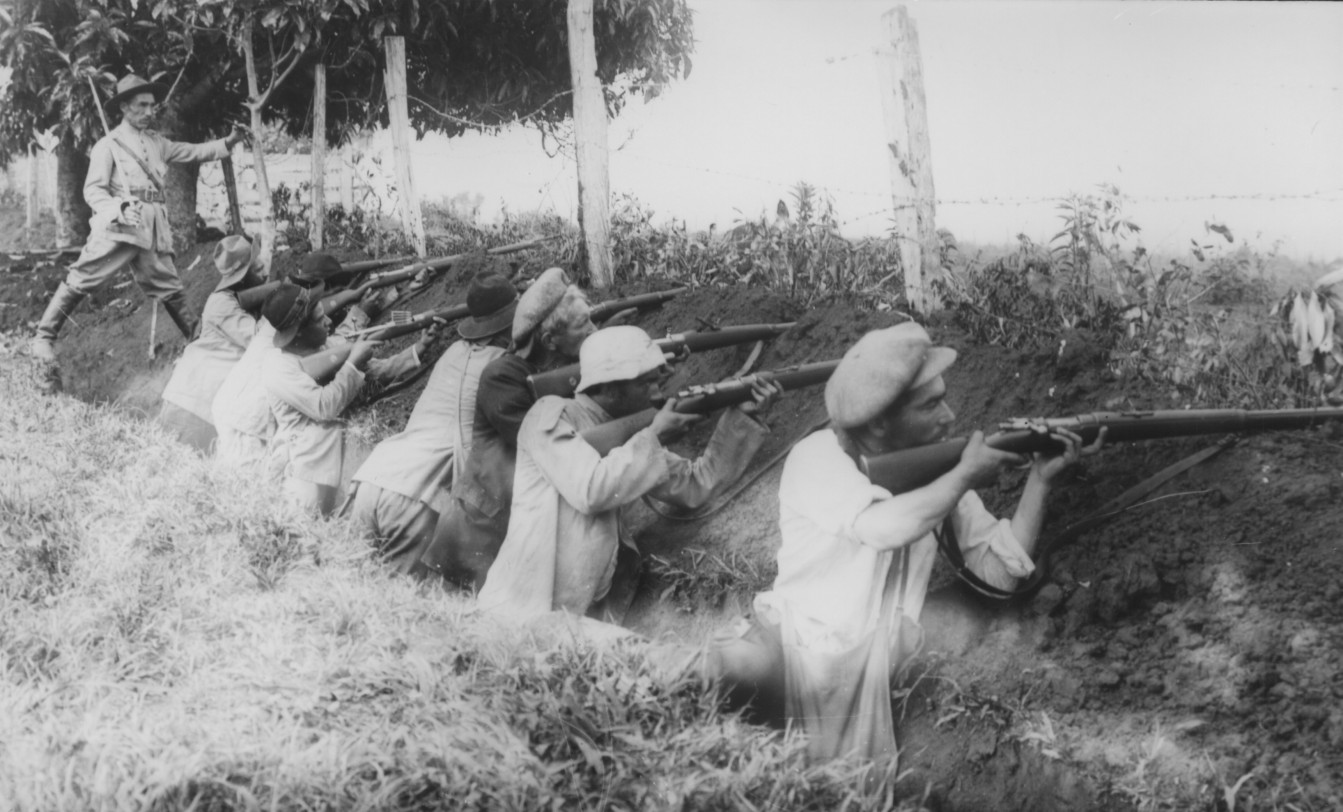
- Revolutionary trench at the Morungava Farm
Date	8–24 October 1930
Location	Sengés, Paraná and Itararé, São Paulo, Brazil 24°7′17″S 49°22′59″W
Result	Revolutionary victory

Belligerents
Revolutionaries; Brazilian Army; Paraná Police; Rio Grande Police; Volunteers	Loyalists; Brazilian Army; São Paulo Police; Volunteers

Commanders and leaders
Miguel Costa	Paes de Andrade

Strength
7,800; 18 guns	2,400–2,600; 8 guns 4 aircraft

Casualties and losses
- At least 45 killed and 168 wounded (Note: 45 dead buried in the Itararé cemetery and 168 wounded evacuated, some of whom died.)

The Battle of Itararé was the main confrontation of the Brazilian Revolution of 1930 on the border between São Paulo and southern Brazil. On the São Paulo side were units of the Brazilian Army, the Public Force of São Paulo, and civilian volunteers loyal to the government of President Washington Luís, under the command of Colonel Paes de Andrade. On the other side, coming from Paraná, were revolutionaries from the Army, the Public Forces of Paraná and Rio Grande do Sul, and volunteers, under the command of Miguel Costa. The advanced positions of the loyalists in Sengés, in Paraná territory, were taken in combat, but the final offensive in São Paulo territory, in the municipality of Itararé, was canceled when a military coup in Rio de Janeiro deposed the president on 24 October 1930.

Itararé had strategic value because the São Paulo-Rio Grande Railway passed over the supposedly impassable ravines of the Itararé River. The city had already almost been the scene of combat during the Federalist Revolution of 1894 and had a reputation for invincibility. It was one of the sectors in which the revolutionaries launched their offensive towards São Paulo, after dominating most of the southern states in the first days of October. Both sides brought thousands of men, with infantry, cavalry, and artillery; the loyalists also had air power. The troops of the Public Force of São Paulo were well-trained and equipped, but the revolutionaries had more men and cannons, under firm military and political leadership. The theater of operations would see tactics of entrenchment, flanking maneuvers, and bombardment.

From 8 to 14 October, the revolutionaries conquered and held the city of Sengés, from where they attacked the Morungava Farm, in the same municipality, on 16 October. This battle lasted fourteen hours on a four-kilometer front, under torrential rain. The revolutionary infantry was repelled, but the loyalist defenders themselves were exhausted and abandoned the position at night, returning to the last line, already in São Paulo territory. Morungava was the key feature of the terrain, with a line of sight for the artillery to bombard Itararé. Miguel Costa planned a frontal attack to fix the position, while detachments on the left and right flanks would surround the defenders of Itararé. With news of the coup in Rio de Janeiro, the defenders laid down their arms. Getúlio Vargas, leader of the revolution, entered Itararé on 28 October.

The contending armies suffered dozens of deaths and hundreds of wounded. Their bombardments and logistical requisitions caused much damage to the populations of the small towns of Itararé and Sengés. Forces loyal to Vargas would have another victory over São Paulo troops in the same location during the Constitutionalist Revolution of 1932. The events of 1930 went down in history as the "battle that never happened," (Note: See, for example, Schwarcz & Starling 2015, ch. 14, McCann 2009, p. 376, Fico 2017, p. 28 and Costa 2014, p. 50.) and the city became an object of ridicule or a symbol of shameful defeat. Some writers, especially from the municipality of Itararé, consider this characterization unfair and prefer to emphasize the battle that actually took place in the municipality of Sengés, a few kilometers away. (Note: See Santos 2015, Estado de S. Paulo 1999, Rachum 2016, p. 265 and several authors discussed in Nascimento 2022.)

== Background ==
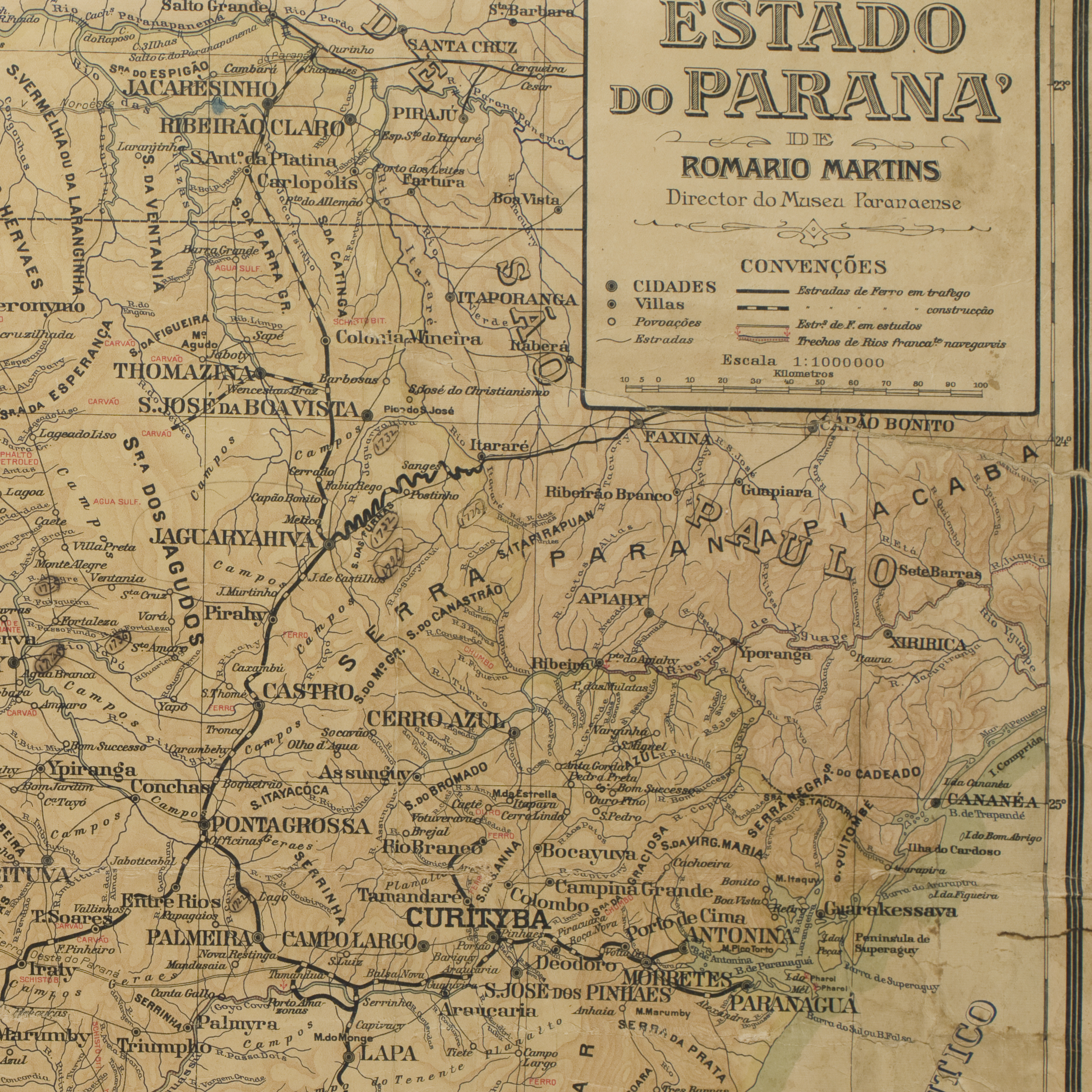
The border between Paraná and São Paulo, from Ourinhos to the coast, on a 1921 map

A civil-military insurrection against Washington Luís, president of Brazil, began in Rio Grande do Sul, Minas Gerais, and Paraíba from 3 to 4 October 1930. In the 5th Military Region, corresponding to Paraná and Santa Catarina, the Brazilian Army and the Public Force of Paraná joined the revolution. On 5 October, the government of Paraná was taken over by General Mário Tourinho. Initially, only the garrisons of Palmas, Castro, Florianópolis, and São Francisco do Sul remained loyal to legality. By mid-October, this list was reduced to Florianópolis, where the Brazilian Navy protected the last legalist stronghold in Southern Brazil.

With Paraná joining the revolution, troops from Rio Grande do Sul and Santa Catarina entered the state and joined the Paraná forces in the offensive towards São Paulo. Due to the distances involved, the main revolutionary forces in contact with the enemy were from Paraná. Volunteers enlisted and newspapers in Curitiba requested donations of all kinds, from cattle to uniforms, to supply the troops. The leader of the revolution, Getúlio Vargas, established his headquarters in Ponta Grossa on 16 October, with military command assigned to Lieutenant Colonel Góis Monteiro.

On the Paraná-São Paulo border, the revolutionaries fought the loyalists, consisting of Army units from São Paulo and Rio de Janeiro, the Public Force of São Paulo (FPESP), and civilian volunteers ("legionnaires"). There were four battlefronts: Quatiguá, Sengés-Itararé, Capela da Ribeira, and Cananeia. Lacking the manpower for an offensive, the loyalists were only concerned with halting the revolutionary advance. For both sides, Itararé was the center of gravity. The São Paulo-Rio Grande Railway passed through there, allowing the largest possible contingent to be transported by the fastest route to São Paulo, passing through Itapetininga and Sorocaba. The final destination would be the federal capital in Rio de Janeiro. The flanks at Ourinhos/Quatiguá, Ribeira and Cananeia were less protected. Ourinhos would open the way to the railway junctions of Bauru and Botucatu. Capela da Ribeira would open the way to Apiaí and Capão Bonito, isolating Itararé, but the area was inhospitable, with dense forest and poor roads. The Cananeia axis, on the coast, was of little strategic value.

Logistics favored the loyalists. The southern coast was under Navy control, forcing the revolutionaries to supply all their forces via the São Paulo-Rio Grande Railway, a 1,400-kilometer route from Santa Maria to Itararé, with railway material in short supply. São Paulo's defense had nearby supply bases and an excellent railway network to the front. The further the revolutionaries advanced, the wider the front would become to protect the flanks and the further they would be from their depots, while the loyalists would be closer to theirs.

São Paulo was able to equip the hundreds of volunteers who came forward to fight, unlike Rio Grande do Sul. The lack of ammunition was a problem, and on 17 August, Oswaldo Aranha, the interim president of Rio Grande do Sul, telegraphed Vargas informing him that "our forces have enough ammunition for another month of fire". The loyalists in São Paulo felt emboldened enough to maintain an offensive in southern Minas Gerais and the Triângulo Mineiro region. However, the loyalist commanders remained hesitant and inactive. The specter of a coup to interrupt the fighting loomed over Rio de Janeiro.

== Opposing forces ==
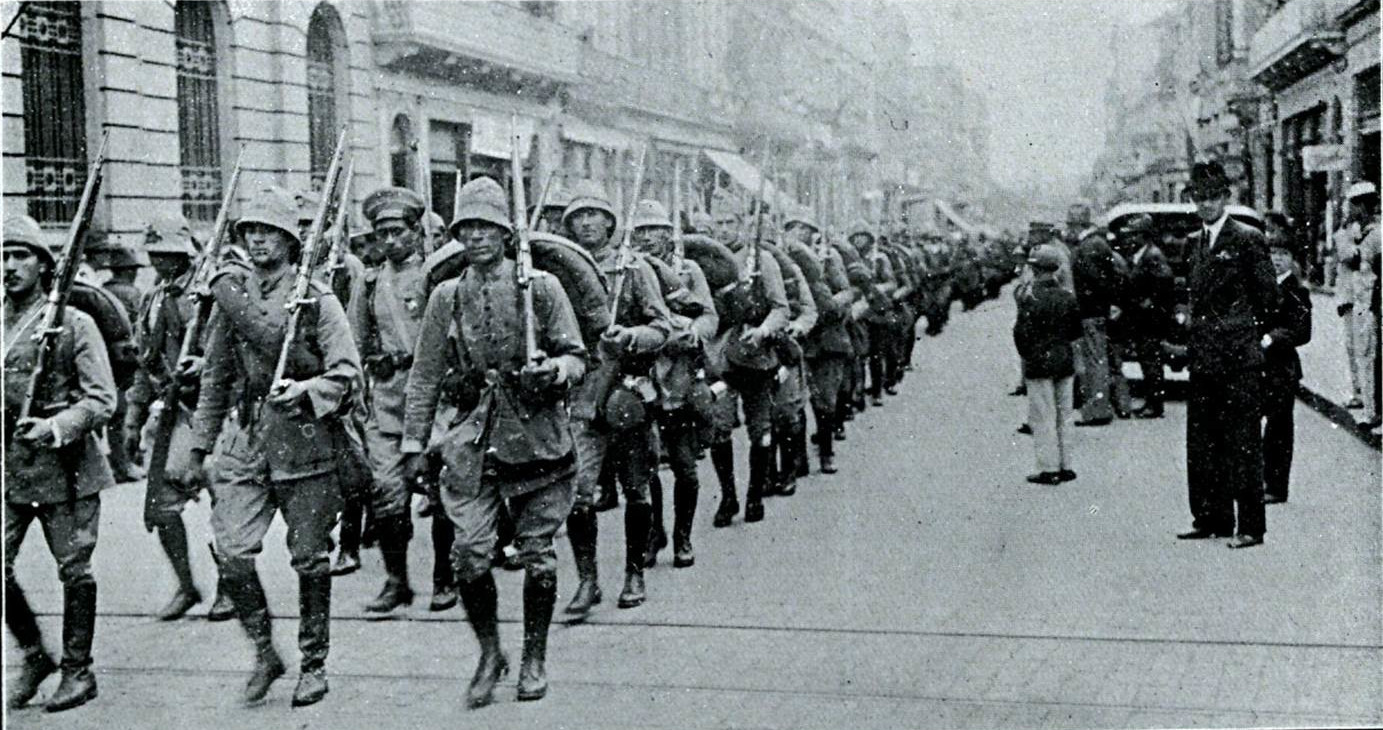
Revolutionaries march in Curitiba on their way to the Itararé front

In the Itararé region, both sides had infantry, cavalry, and artillery. The revolutionaries also brought an engineering contingent, and the loyalists, a squadron of four aircraft from the São Paulo Public Force. More than half of the loyalist force on the border with Paraná was supplied by the FPESP. The force had a reputation for being elite and its troops were well-equipped and trained, although they had suffered defeats in the tenentist campaigns of the previous decade. (Note: See Public Forces (Brazil).) The revolutionaries were inferior in troop quality, but concentrated greater numbers and materiel and had a talented military leadership and firm political resolve.

The loyalist force throughout the southern border of São Paulo, from Ourinhos to Iguape, reached five to six thousand soldiers, including three thousand from the FPESP, 1,600 from the Army, and one thousand volunteers. The records are incomplete and the number may have been higher. (Note: Other sources cite a force of the same proportion, with up to 6,200 loyalists, specifically in Itararé.) Specifically in Itararé there were 2,400 or 2,600 loyalist soldiers. According to the oral tradition of the São Paulo Military Police, at the end of October, when the battle ended, there were still troops on their way to Itararé.

At its peak, the revolutionary force reached 7,800 men. On the São Paulo-Rio Grande Railway, 15,700 soldiers were waiting in 108 convoys. The total revolutionary army on this front may have reached more than thirty thousand soldiers. The force deployed in Itararé was divided among the detachments of Colonel Silva Júnior (4,300 men), General Flores da Cunha (1,100 men), Major Alexínio Bittencourt (1,600 men) and Colonel Batista Luzardo (1,200 men), plus an extra corps of five hundred engineers, many of them railway workers. The Flores da Cunha detachment, which included volunteers from Rio Grande do Sul, was the most mobile one, as it consisted only of mounted troops. The Bittencourt and Flores da Cunha detachments began arriving on the 14th. The Luzardo detachment only arrived in Ponta Grossa on the 23rd.

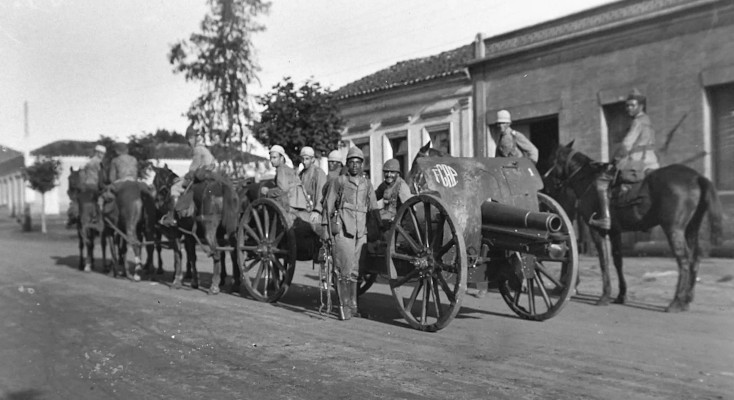
Loyalist 105mm artillery piece

The loyalist command initially fell to FPESP Lieutenant Colonel Herculano de Carvalho e Silva, and later to Army Colonel Arnaldo de Souza Paes de Andrade. Lieutenant Colonel Herculano was appointed Chief of Staff of the Itararé Detachment, and later, Commander of the Public Force Battalion Group. The revolutionary operations were commanded by Miguel Costa, an officer of the FPESP. Ironically, he led large contingents of the Army against Paes de Andrade, an Army officer responsible for a large contingent of the FPESP. Miguel Costa was an experienced guerrilla fighter from the days of the Miguel Costa-Prestes Column, who would prove equally skilled in the tactics of positional warfare. His Chief of Staff was Army Colonel João de Mendonça Lima.

The composition of the artillery has not yet been fully studied. Both sides had 75-millimeter Krupp guns, and the superior range of the more modern Revolutionary guns would be crucial. But the loyalist 1st Heavy Artillery Group had 105-millimeter guns at Itararé. The loyalist artillery, according to sources, had eight 75-millimeter guns, and the revolutionaries, twelve or eighteen guns. In total, the loyalists had 23 infantry companies, two cavalry squadrons and three artillery batteries against 27 infantry companies, 18 cavalry squadrons and nine artillery batteries.

=== Order of battle ===
List of units deployed to the Itararé front
Loyalists	Revolutionaries
Itararé Detachment: 5th Infantry Regiment, from Lorena; 2nd Infantry Battalion of the Public Force; 3rd Infantry Battalion of the Public Force; 5th Infantry Battalion of the Public Force; 6th Infantry Battalion of the Public Force; 4th Battalion of Caçadores, from São Paulo (partly); 2nd Cavalry Regiment of the Public Force; 5th Divisional Cavalry Regiment, from Castro (partly); Silvio de Campos Legionnaires Battalion; 4th Horse Artillery Regiment, from Itu; 1st Heavy Artillery Group, from Rio de Janeiro; Public Force Aviation Squadron	Miguel Costa Detachments Group: Colonel Silva Junior Detachment; 8th Infantry Regiment, from Cruz Alta; 13th Infantry Regiment, from Ponta Grossa; 15th Battalion of Caçadores, from Curitiba; Colonel Quim César Regiment (cavalry); 9th Horse Artillery Regiment, from Curitiba; 5th Mountain Artillery Group, from Lapa; General Flores da Cunha Detachment; 1st Cavalry Regiment of the Military Brigade of Rio Grande do Sul; 8th Independent Cavalry Regiment, from Uruguaiana; 5th Independent Horse Artillery Group, from Livramento; Pires Contingent; Major Alexínio Detachment; 13th Battalion of Caçadores, from Joinville; Cavalry Regiment of the Public Force of Paraná; Section of the 5th Mountain Artillery Group; Colonel Batista Luzardo Detachment; 5th Independent Cavalry Regiment, from Uruguaiana; Virgílio Viana Battalion, from São Borja; 2nd Independent Horse Artillery Group, from Uruguaiana; Engineering corps

== Terrain ==
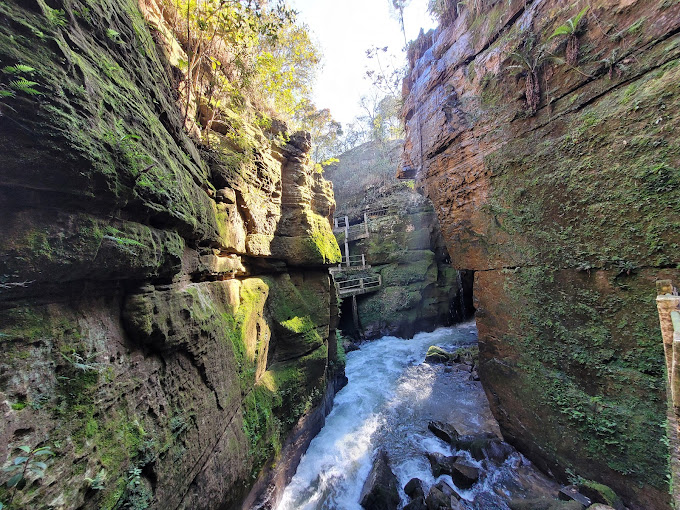
Itararé River ravines

The theater of operations covered more than twenty kilometers in width by twenty in depth, crossed on the east-west axis by the São Paulo-Rio Grande do Sul Railway. The Itararé River separates the municipalities of Itararé, in the state of São Paulo, and Sengés, in the state of Paraná. Their town centers are thirteen kilometers apart in a straight line. Itararé was a town of poor housing and less than seven thousand inhabitants. Sengés was tiny. Most of the area between the two towns was farmland. The weather conditions in mid-October 1930 were torrential rains.

The Itararé River is known for its impassable ravines, granite cliffs up to twenty meters deep, which extend for twenty kilometers, mainly south of the city. Memoirs often exaggerate this aspect. Claro Jansson compared Itararé to Thermopylae. But the reputation for natural invincibility must be put into perspective: the São Paulo frontier is extensive, the steep ravines are limited to a few kilometers, and any fixed defense can be bypassed. It is feasible to cross the river a few kilometers south or northwest of the city. A continuous line protecting these flanks would require a much larger number of troops than were available in 1930. A single line at Itararé would only serve to cover a retreat to the east.

To avoid encirclement or flanking, it was necessary to control the major obstacle in the topography, the Morungava hill. The Morungava Farm (Note: A former stopping point for tropeiros, Morungava is frequently mentioned in the local history of Itararé, although it is not located within the municipality. The farm is currently called Santa Gil.) is located in Paraná state, eight kilometers west of Itararé. Between Sengés and the river, south of the railway, are the hills of Cafezal (average elevation of 810 meters), Pelame or Pelado (830 meters), Morungava (840 meters) and Funil (940 meters further south, but without obstructing the dominant view of Morungava). The Funil hill separates the Funil stream from the Itararé river. East of the Itararé river, a final elevation before the city does not exceed 700 meters. North of the railway the terrain is gentler, descending to elevations of 500 to 600 meters. On this side of the railway, a hill with an elevation of 730 meters dominates the view over the Morungava railway station. Behind it, to the northwest, are the Ribeirão do Onofre and a 740-meter elevation, where the Sítio and Passo do Cipriano are located. North of Cipriano, the Itararé River is easily passable.

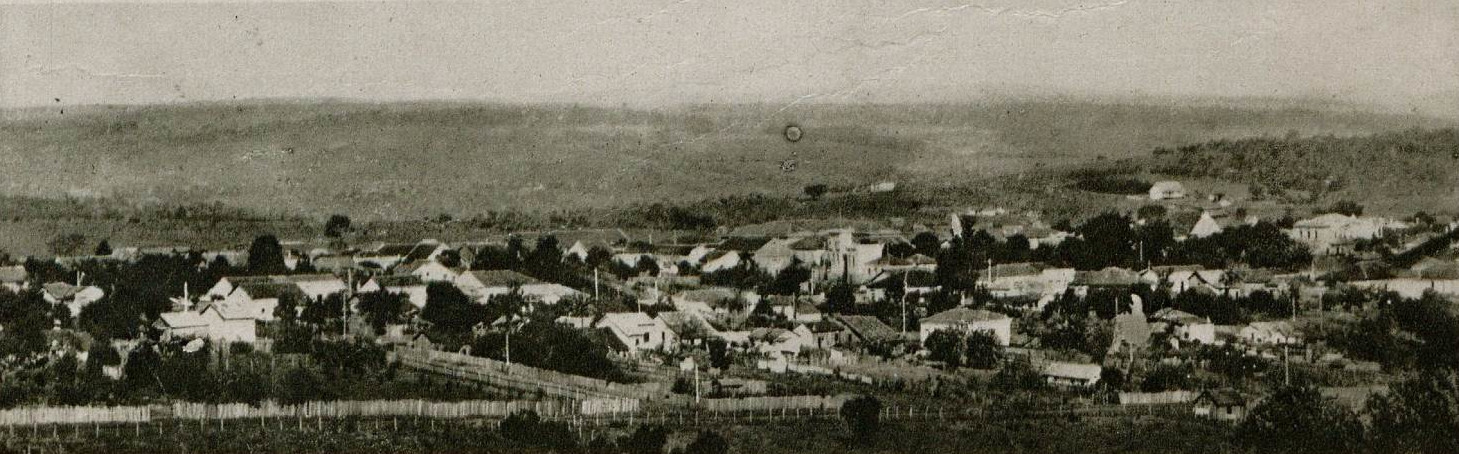
Panoramic view of Itararé in 1930

Located 336 kilometers from the city of São Paulo and 283 from Curitiba, Itararé, along with the Paraná River, Ourinhos, and Capela da Ribeira, was one of the only easily passable points between the two states before the development of highways and air transport. For armies coming from the south, it was an obligatory passage. During the Federalist Revolution, loyalists from São Paulo positioned themselves in Itararé awaiting an offensive by federalists coming from Rio Grande do Sul. On the eve of the battle, in March 1894, the federalists of General Antônio Carlos da Silva Piragibe withdrew upon hearing news of the defeat of the Naval Revolt in Rio de Janeiro and the advantageous situation for the loyalists in Santa Catarina. In the Constitutionalist Revolution of 1932, constitutionalist and federal forces clashed in the same positions as in the battle of 1930.

The defensive positions in Itararé were themselves far less important than the overall picture of forces in 1894. However, the city became a symbol of invincibility in the national consciousness. Dilermando Monteiro de Assis, recalling the 1932 campaign, asserted that the fall of Itararé was not only a material loss for the people of São Paulo, but also "a death blow to the illusion of those who supposed that the São Paulo Verdun was there, where the fearsome waves from the South would be stopped".

== Battles in Paraná ==
=== Initial movements ===
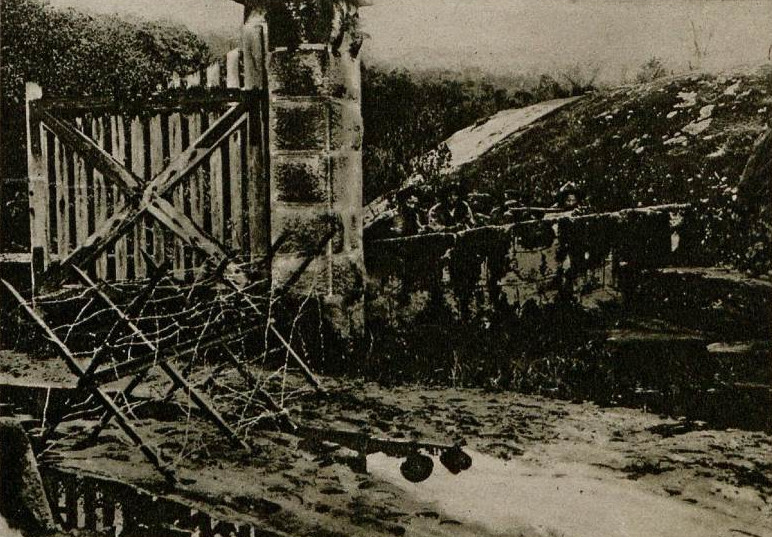
Barbed wire on the bridge over the Itararé River

On 3 October, as soon as the revolution began, Lieutenant Colonel Herculano left São Paulo for Itararé with the 2nd Infantry Battalion of the Public Force (BIFP). Part of the Itapetininga battalion contingent already occupied the city. From the following day, the loyalists established advanced defensive positions in Sengés and at the Morungava Farm. On the same day, the 5th Divisional Cavalry Regiment (RCD), from the Paraná city of Castro, refused to join the revolution and went to Itararé to join the loyalists from São Paulo. An incursion as far as Jaguariaíva damaged the railway and sent nine locomotives to Itararé as a measure of interdiction, but the loyalists remained on the defensive near the state border. On the 9th, the newspaper Gazeta do Povo, from Curitiba, pointed out: "Government forces having been in Itararé since the beginning of the revolutionary movement, remained there without attempting anything against us, when in fact they could have advanced at least as far as Castro, since the road was open to them".

Paes de Andrade took maximum advantage of the hills and ravines of the Itararé River. He organized two lines of resistance, a main one along the river, in the region of Gruta da Barreira, and another advanced one on the Paraná side, to establish contact with the enemy, assess their strength and gather information. In this way, the defense was made in front of the obstacle (the river), with depth: Sengés, Morungava and Itararé. Meanwhile, Miguel Costa's column departed from Marcelino Ramos and by 4 October had already reached the border of Santa Catarina with Paraná in Porto União.

=== Sengés ===
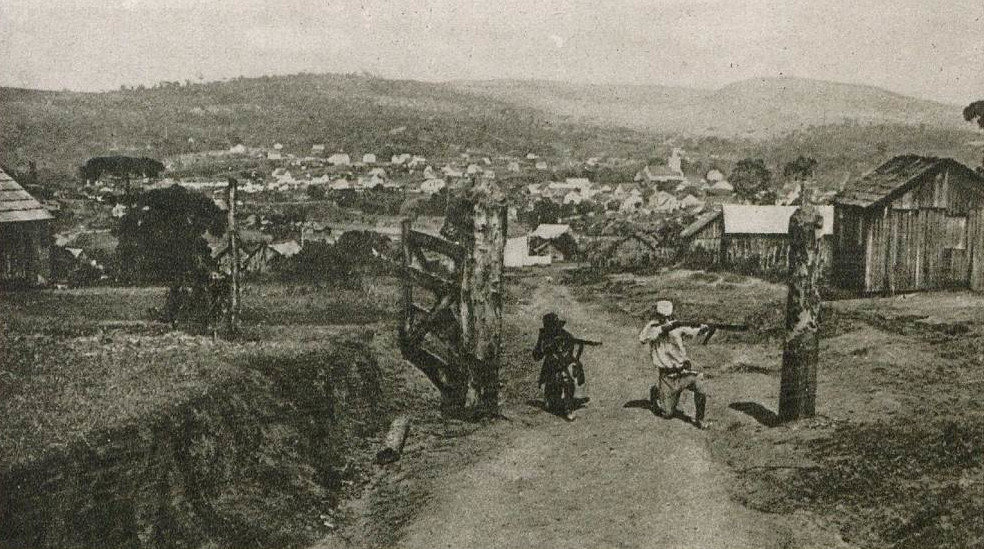
Panorama of the city of Sengés

The revolutionaries attacked Sengés on 8 October or in the early morning of the 9th. The 1st Company of the 13th Infantry Regiment (RI), under Captain Ayrton Plaisant, and the Cavalry Squadron of the Paraná Public Force (FPPR) approached the railway station, informed by a civilian that there were no defenders there. The revolutionaries were met with bursts of machine-gun fire and rifle fire from over one hundred men of the São Paulo Public Force. The cavalrymen retreated, dismounted and, together with the infantry, expelled the São Paulo force, which suffered several dead and wounded. Two hours of combat were fought on the hills above the train station. According to another source, the attacking force consisted of three companies of the 13th RI and two infantry companies and a cavalry squadron of the FPPR.

Paes de Andrade still tried to retake Sengés. A first loyalist reconnaissance was carried out by Captain Heliodoro Rocha Mendes, with 104 men. According to his account, "The advance is arduous. We have rugged terrain ahead of us. In addition, from time to time, rebel elements lying in wait fire upon us. But, at nightfall, we sighted Sengés. We took up position and left the troops ready for attack". There was open combat between infantry detachments. After three days, a loyalist reinforcement of 317 men arrived, eighteen light and four heavy machine guns, under Major José Teófilo Ramos, of the 4th BIFP. Heliodoro pressed Sengés, while Captain Mário Rodrigues Alves made a flanking maneuver on the left. The loyalists found the city well defended. Major Ramos reported: "To proceed here is suicide". HQ ordered him to fix his positions where he was. At dawn, revolutionary reinforcements arrived by train. Faced with the revolutionary counter-offensive, Paes de Andrade authorized the retreat.The Dicionário das Batalhas Brasileiras dates the engagement of Sengés on 14 October.

The fighting continued daily. Sengés gave time to prepare the defense of Morungava hill, which would force the revolutionaries to once again deploy for a costly battle, in the last resistance before Itararé. The revolutionaries had in the vicinity of Sengés the 13th RI, a cavalry squadron of the FPPR, 8th RI, 15th Battalion of Caçadores (BC) and 9th Mounted Artillery Regiment (RAM), with twelve cannons. The artillery positioned itself on Morro do Cafezal, pointed at the Morungava Farm, and began bombardments on the 14th. One of the pieces exploded in a firing incident. The loyalists bombarded Sengés with their aircraft.

=== Morungava Farm ===
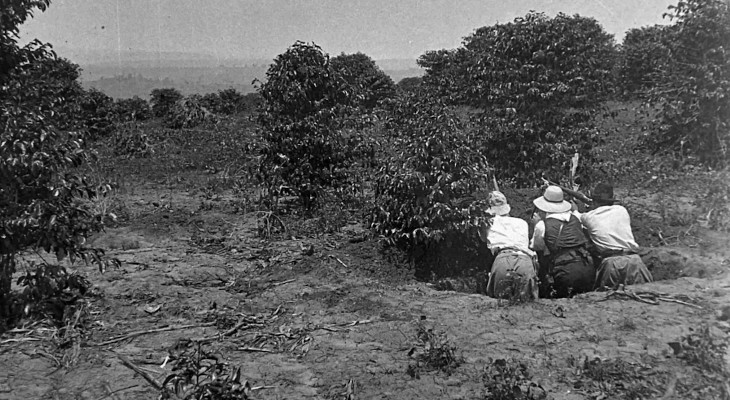
Coffee plantation at Morungava Farm

16 October was a day of torrential rain. In the morning, artillery on Cafezal hill bombarded the loyalist positions, restricting the movement of the defenders, but they held their ground. The loyalist defense consisted of 760 soldiers and automatic weapons entrenched on the slopes of Pelame and Morungava Farm hills. 4,300 revolutionaries (Note: Or more than five thousand.) attacked across the entire line: a reinforced brigade, equivalent to about ten battalions, against two loyalist battalions. The attacking formation had the Quim César Battalion on the left, the 1st battalion of the 8th RI in the center, and a battalion of the 13th RI on the right. The 15th BC, made up of medical students from Curitiba, was positioned on Cafezal hill. Ayrton Plaisant had occupied a base for night operations.

The attack, which had been two kilometers long, extended to four kilometers over the course of the day. Miguel Costa personally established himself on Cafezal hill. The 8th RI and 15th BC attempted movements on the loyalist flanks, without success. The 8th RI came closest, and even then had to retreat, leaving 77 men prisoners. The last effort was made by the 15th BC, launched at the edge of the loyalist line. At noon this battalion received orders to reinforce the 13th RI, which had run out of ammunition. At 14:00, they were ordered to return. According to the account of Gavino Muggiati, a civilian volunteer from Paraná, the 2nd Company got lost and ended up fixed in a position targeted by enemy machine guns. The battalion's own machine gun company identified them as enemies and opened fire until a sergeant, raising a flag, informed them of the disagreement at 16:00.

Colonel Mendonça Lima reported:

We're already more than four kilometers ahead. We've made almost no progress. The situation is becoming difficult. We only have two reserve companies left, and the enemy gunfire is becoming increasingly intense. Bursts of fire are coming from every fold of the terrain, making further advance impossible.

The shooting lasted fourteen hours, at the end of which the attackers retreated to their starting point. One unknown factor is the absence of loyalist artillery: the defenders only used automatic weapons, machine guns and occasional aerial bombardments. Possibly, Paes de Andrade wanted to keep his heavy artillery in Itararé because he anticipated a retreat. According to Hélio Silva, "Paes de Andrade could not do much. His guns did not have the range of the revolutionary artillery. Firing from Itararé, his shells sometimes fell on the loyalist lines of Morungava themselves. However, legality makes every inch of ground expensive".

=== Loyalist retreat ===
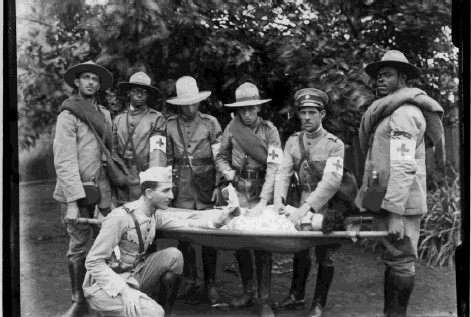
Loyalist volunteer wounded in combat

The loyalists also had many casualties and their prolonged resistance was uncertain. Major Teófilo Ramos informed Paes de Andrade that "even my P.C. [Command Post] today is being battered by enemy artillery. The bombardment is so effective and accurate that it even blocks the door of the P.C. We can't even distribute lunch to the troops". The loyalists abandoned Morungava during the night, leaving behind some of their dead who could not be transported. The revolutionary advance had been delayed by two weeks. With the retreat, the 13th RI and 15th BC occupied the trenches.

Morungava had stories like that of FPESP lieutenant Francisco Martins, who, wounded in the leg, refused appeals to return to the rear: "let the bad blood flow out". He would later be hit by a burst of machine gun fire in the abdomen, dying four days later. On the revolutionary side, the commander of the 15th BC, Captain Isaltino Pinho, was killed by a burst of machine-gun fire while leading the attack. His name was later given to the Morungava railway station.

The victory was announced in a telegram by Miguel Costa:

General Plínio Tourinho, Regional Commander – Curitiba – The revolution achieved another memorable victory yesterday. The enemy occupied the left bank of the Itararé River with strong defensive positions and a large abundance of automatic weapons. We began the attack at 08:30. We fought fiercely all day, conquering, one by one, all the enemy's trenches. Taking advantage of the night, the enemy broke contact, abandoning the last trench. Due to deficient cavalry, a pursuit was not possible. We seized a large quantity of ammunition and automatic weapons, not yet inventoried. We took some prisoners. Troop morale is increasingly high. Greetings.

The following day, another message from the commander, published in Gazeta do Povo, mentioned the Itararé and Quatiguá-Ourinhos fronts:

A calm day across the entire front, with only one PRP reconnaissance plane over São José da Boa Vista and Wenceslau Braz station. On the Itararé branch line, the Silva Júnior detachment spent the day consolidating positions gained from yesterday's attack and inventorying the materiel left behind by the enemy during their retreat. On the Ourinhos branch line, the Alcides Etchegoyen detachment spent the day reconnoitering over the Itararé River and transporting twenty-three wounded enemies and 150 prisoners, including four officers, one from the Army and three from the São Paulo Public Force. An indescribable enthusiasm reigns among our troops.

The triumphant tone of the official accounts, aimed at the society of the large centers, contrasts with the hardships of a firsthand account from the front line. According to Muggiati, "despite our victory, we were not satisfied, as the entire troop was exhausted. [...] Our platoon organizes the surveillance service under a formidable amount of rain, without coats, without blankets and hungry".

=== Aerial operations ===
The loyalist squadron was commanded by Captain João Negrão. The planes took off from airstrips in Itapetininga and Itararé, the latter improvised on a plateau next to the city. The flights were reconnaissance flights, and from the 11th or 12th, bombing flights. In Sengés, their main target was the railway bridge over the Jaguaricatu River. Due to the rudimentary method of dropping bombs, the military objective was not achieved, but the revolutionaries had to improvise an anti-aircraft defense service with platoons on the heights of Sengés. A lower and more precise bombing would have forced Miguel Costa to modify the plans, but the loyalist aviation was not efficient. A more precise attack was achieved on the morning of 17 October, causing many casualties. The soldiers, most of whom had never seen a plane before, wasted their ammunition on bullets fired indiscriminately. Some of the airmen made low passes to strafe revolutionary positions.

== Final offensive ==
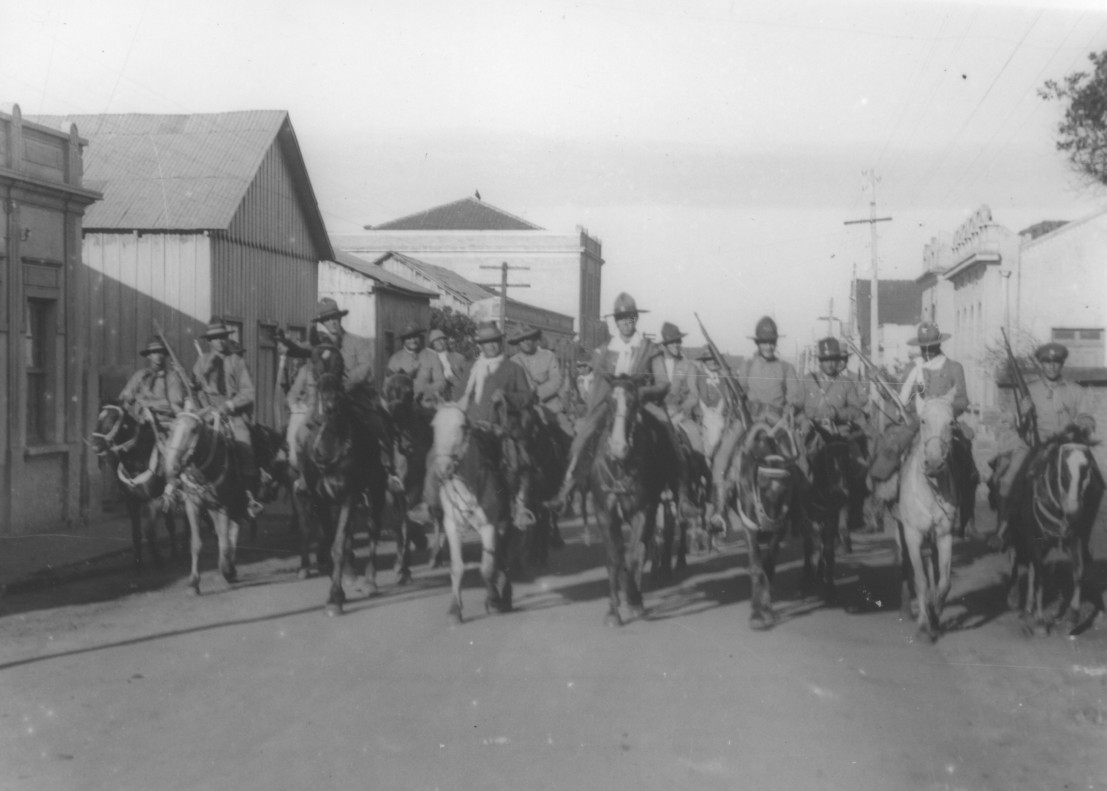
Flores da Cunha's cavalry in Itararé

Having taken possession of Morungava, the binoculars were already pointed at their targets in Itararé. The artillery positioned on the heights of Morungava could directly bombard the loyalist positions near Gruta da Barreira, four kilometers away, without response from the loyalist artillery. The constant bombardment, by itself, was not enough. Miguel Costa spent another week concentrating forces. From 20 to 24 October, bad weather prevented a general offensive. Paes de Andrade, with the information gathered from the air raids, knew of the imminent maneuver and wanted to attack before the revolutionaries received more reinforcements and completed their deployment. He asked his superiors for authorization for an offensive, but received the order: "defend Itararé at all costs". An attack would be the only way to maintain the defense of Itararé, but there was neither military strength nor political will.

The loyalist line on the right bank of the Itararé River was perhaps ten kilometers long. Miguel Costa's campaign plan was to engage Colonel Silva Júnior's detachment in a frontal attack on Itararé, while the Flores da Cunha and Alexínio Bittencourt detachments would make a pincer movement from the north and south. Batista Luzardo would remain in reserve. The frontal attack, in a four-kilometer advance, would pinpoint the defenders and neutralize their reaction. On the southern flank, the Alexínio Detachment would cross the river at an unprotected ford to attack the heart of the loyalist position, in a 45-kilometer march. On the northwest flank, the Flores da Cunha Detachment, in a 27-kilometer march, would cross the river at Passo do Cipriano, bypass the defensive line, and take the Ibiti Station to cut off the defenders' retreat line. The Batista Luzardo Brigade would remain near Miguel Costa's headquarters in reserve. The artillery would signal the start of the attack.

Alexínio's Detachment began its movement on the 23rd and crossed the Itararé River at an unguarded pass. It is not known which one, but judging by the topography, it was probably twenty kilometers south of Itararé. The terrain was difficult. Flores da Cunha positioned himself at Sítio Cipriano without being detected by the enemy. According to the Dicionário das Batalhas Brasileiras, "lively debates are still being waged regarding the possibilities of the city resisting or falling". In Góis Monteiro's assessment, "militarily, the government forces' position was untenable, their defeat depending only on a matter of days". On 24 October, "the bulk of the forces of the Southern States were along the border of São Paulo with Paraná, that State already having been invaded at various points on both sides of the Itararé region".

Military historian Hélio Tenório dos Santos believed that, once the final battle began, Itararé would fall to the revolution, with most or all of the loyalist troops captured. The Flores da Cunha Detachment alone would have triggered the fall, as the bibliography does not mention the presence of loyalist troops further east of Itararé, protecting the Ibiti station. The loyalists would face simultaneous threats beyond their capacity to react. Their best chance would be a retreat to Ibiti or Engenheiro Maia, but this would be difficult in contact with the frontal attack. If the entire loyalist defense plan assumed a delaying action — destroying the infrastructure and placing successive defensive positions, in the style of João Cabanas in 1924 — the fall of Itapetininga could be delayed until after 8 November. But this was not the plan. The loyalist command was clinging to the idea of trench warfare. The 1930 plan would be executed in the battle of 1932, with a frontal attack and flanking maneuvers. In 1932, the trenches of Itararé managed to contain the frontal attack and the offensive on their right flank for two days and retreat in good order.

== Revolutionary victory ==
On 23 October, Miguel Costa scheduled the final offensive for noon on 25 October. The revolution was advancing throughout the country. The last state governments loyal to Washington Luís were those of Santa Catarina, Amazonas, Pará, Goiás, Mato Grosso, Bahia, São Paulo, and Rio de Janeiro, but the political leadership in São Paulo remained optimistic. Newspapers announced "the greatest battle in South America", to be fought in Itararé, and the country anxiously awaited news from the front. The fighting would be the largest of the entire revolution. However, on 24 October, a coup d'état in Rio de Janeiro deposed the president and installed a military junta, which ordered the end of loyalist military operations.

=== Surrender ===
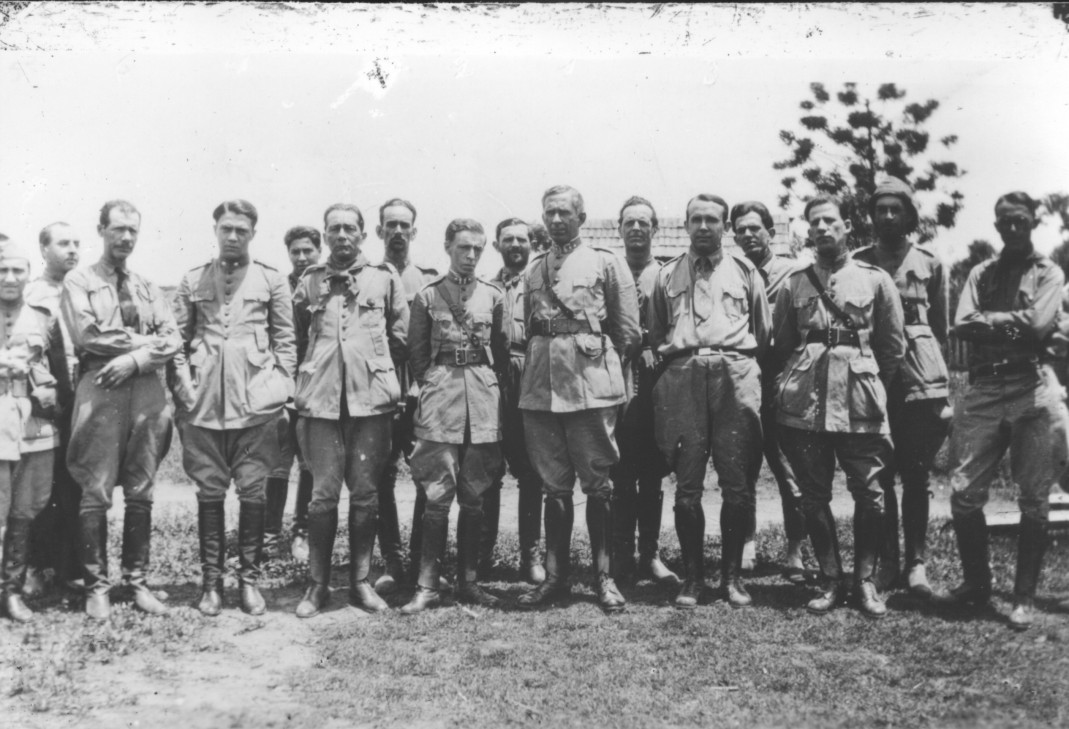
Miguel Costa's General Staff, in the center, at the Morungava Farm

On the morning of 24 October, the São Paulo lawyer Maurício Goulart brought Miguel Costa the news, transmitted from Curitiba and Ponta Grossa, of the fall of Washington Luís. Getúlio Vargas' General Staff ordered: "If tomorrow, by noon, the PRP forces have not laid down their arms, the attack must be continued". The following day, the directive to all revolutionary commanders was: "From noon today the offensives will resume against any element that opposes our advance and refuses to lay down arms". According to Muggiati's account, preparations began at three in the morning of the 25th. The march to battle began at 05:00, but the order was revoked and the troops awaited a superior decision.

At seven in the morning, congressman Glicério Alves crossed the lines with a white flag and asked to speak with Paes de Andrade. Miguel Costa’s demand was unconditional surrender. When Paes de Andrade refused, Glicério informed him of the coup in Rio de Janeiro and proposed that the loyalist commander go personally to Sengés. Paes de Andrade arrived at the revolutionary headquarters in Sengés at 11:00, where he resolved his doubts. In Itararé, Lieutenant Colonel Herculano received, late in the afternoon, a bulletin from the command of the Public Force ordering an end to hostilities. In a phone call with the force's commander, Colonel Joviniano Brandão, Herculano still insisted: "If you joined them out of fear, unjoin them. No one gets through here". Orders to abandon resistance were also coming from General Hastínfilo de Moura, commander of the 2nd Military Region and head of the state government appointed by the junta.

Paes de Andrade signed the surrender act in Sengés:

- a) From this date onward, hostilities are terminated.
- b) Colonel Paes de Andrade shall order all troops withdrawn from the trenches and returned to their quarters and bivouacs.
- c) He shall order the legionnaires to withdraw to Itararé, where they will be disarmed and their weapons turned over at the Itararé station at the disposal of General Miguel Costa.
- d) In the name of Dr. Getúlio Vargas, President of the Republic, he shall invite his officers and enlisted men to join the Revolution; those who accept shall be immediately incorporated into the Liberating Army.
- e) Once the preceding clauses have been fulfilled, he shall proceed immediately to Ponta Grossa, where he will confer with Colonel Góes Monteiro.
- f) The vanguard of the Detachment Group shall proceed to Itararé as soon as Colonel Paes de Andrade arrives there.
- g) The ammunition depots at Itararé shall be handed over to the commander of that vanguard.
- h) Colonel Paes de Andrade shall not be held responsible for anything done in his absence.

Most loyalist officers signed the "white book" of adherence and wore the red scarf of the revolution around their necks. As a result of the fighting, 45 dead were buried in the Itararé cemetery and 168 wounded were evacuated, some of whom died.

=== Vargas enters São Paulo ===
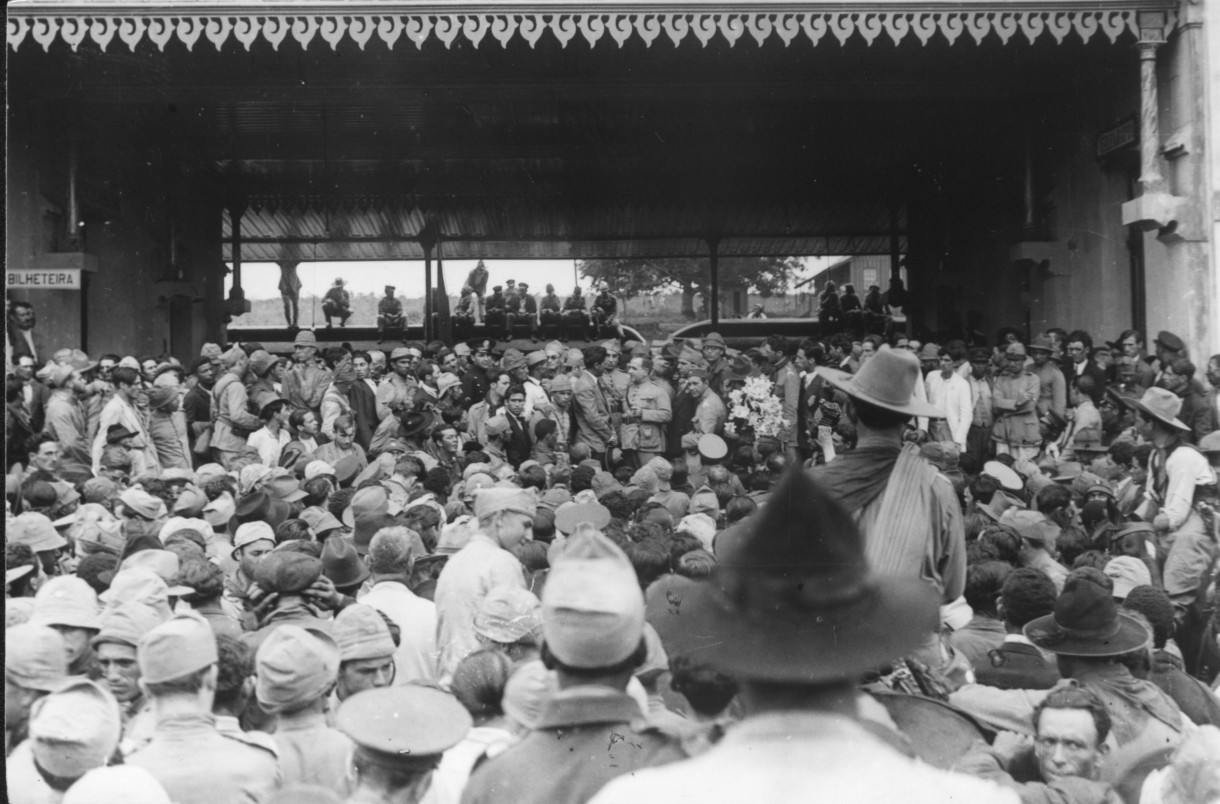
Getúlio Vargas at the Itararé train station

Getúlio Vargas's train entered Itararé on 28 October and was acclaimed by the few inhabitants who were still there. Claro Jansson took one of the most famous photographs of the revolution at the train station. A power struggle emerged between the revolutionary command in Ponta Grossa and the junta in Rio de Janeiro. Góis Monteiro sent a radio message to the junta: "Our forces, plus 30,000 men, occupying the southern state of São Paulo, will continue their advance until complete submission". General Tasso Fragoso, on behalf of the junta, handed over the government to Vargas on 3 November. In his inaugural speech, Vargas stated that, even without the coup, "within two or three weeks, the legions from the north, center, and south would knock on the gates of the capital of the Republic". Revolutionary troops from all over the country accompanied him to the capital. Itararé was the "last act of forty years of the Old Republic in Brazil", and Vargas would rule until 1945.

== Consequences for the civilians ==
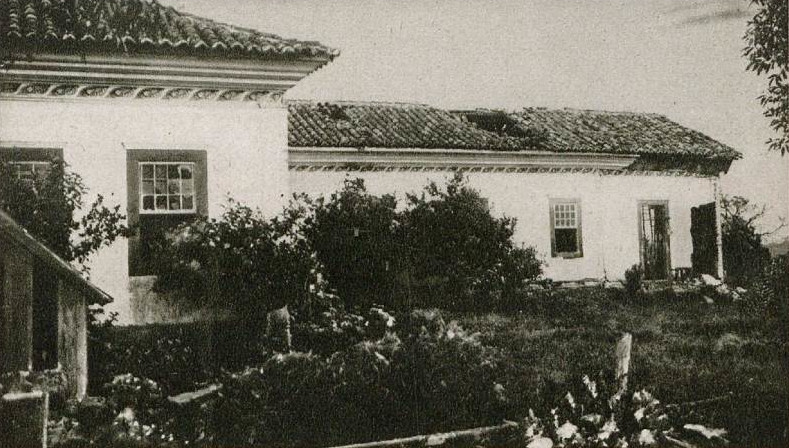
Combat damage at Morungava Farm

The defining feature of the battles of 1930 and 1932, for the populations of Itararé and Sengés, was the destruction and looting by the troops. During the conflict, both cities were abandoned by most of the population. In Sengés, all the houses became command posts and military barracks. The Presbyterian Church was turned into a field hospital. Horses, saddles, harnesses, cooking equipment, food, clothing and everything else that the numerous revolutionary army needed was requisitioned or simply taken from the city. Loyalist air raids destroyed the cotton processing factory tower, houses, the water tower and part of the church converted into a hospital.

In Itararé, Paes de Andrade established his command at the railway station and distributed the occupying troops throughout the town hall, municipal council, school and hospital. He requisitioned for himself, as a residence, a house on Rua São Pedro, the city's main street, and his officers settled in other abandoned dwellings. The city regressed with the conflict, losing its large commercial stores and telephone service. Almost all family histories depict exodus and losses. There is no record of government compensation for the damages caused.

== Legacy ==
=== "The battle that didn't happen" ===
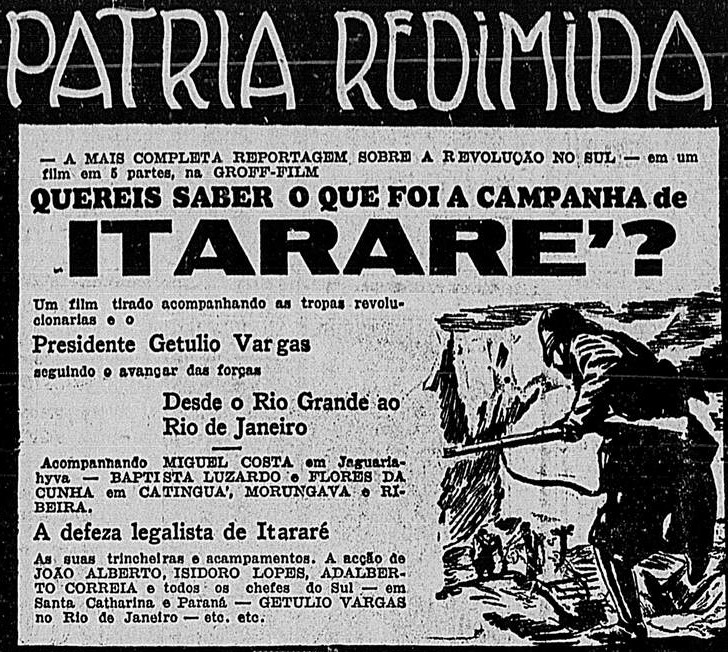
Advertisement for the screening of the documentary Pátria Redimida, by João Groff, in 1931, depicting the 1930 revolution, including the events in Itararé

São Paulo took up arms against the new regime in the Constitutionalist Revolution of 1932, resulting in the third battle of Itararé, won once again by forces loyal to Vargas. Rumors from the time of the war, and accounts from the "14th of July" academic volunteer battalion, which remained in the rear, spread that Itararé had been surrendered without a fight, through treachery or cowardice. The report of the government forces, however, confirms the occurrence of intense fighting.

In Brazilian historiography, the crystallized memory of Itararé is that it was the "battle that didn't happen". As recalled by the newspaper Estado de S. Paulo, "in 1930, according to official history, the decisive battle, announced with great fanfare, did not occur and the revolutionary troops entered Itararé without firing a shot. Two years later, in the same place, the constitutionalists suffered another defeat at the hands of the federal forces". According to local writer José Maria Silva, "our city entered history through the back door and became a laughingstock". The event's reputation for non-violence was built in part by the Rio Grande do Sul journalist and humorist Aparício Torelly, who used various noble titles followed by the name Itararé as a pseudonym in the 1930s. For Itararé writer Hélio Porto, if Torelly "wanted to make his enormous mockery, he ended up being the greatest promoter of our city to this day". The "city became a national laughingstock and jokes multiplied mocking the shameful defeat of the São Paulo troops".

According to Boris Fausto, "the 'battle of Itararé' became known in history as the battle that did not occur". Hernâni Donato, in his Dicionário das batalhas brasileiras, called it a battle "that did not happen and yet entered History". Along the same lines, Frank McCann ("in Itararé there was no battle, but a stalemate"; "neither side showed much interest in a major battle while waiting for the weather to improve and the political climate to reveal itself") and Lilia Schwarcz and Heloisa Starling (the battle "never happened" and "both sides simply decided to wait [...] It might even have been a sensible decision, but militarism was exacerbated and the general feeling was that the country was experiencing a huge anticlimax"). The historiography of the 1964 coup d'état uses "battle of Itararé", "of saliva" or "of telephone calls" as ironic figures to characterize military operations without combat.

Some sources report that "the contenders (...) after preparing for a decisive clash, withdrew to defensive positions, without firing a shot, peacefully negotiating the outcome", and that "without a single shot being fired, the battle failed". Others also acknowledge the fighting in Sengés and Morungava, although without mentioning locations: McCann mentioned that the loyalists "tested the rebel lines with incursions of small units and exchanged artillery fire". Barbosa Lima Sobrinho cited "slight encounters of vanguards". Schwarcz and Starling reported that the contenders "exchanged some shots and stopped". And the Dicionário das Batalhas Brasileiras places dates and locations and describes the events as "among the most important battles of the campaign" and preparation for "what would be the Battle of Itararé". Brazilianist Jordan Young described a "military stalemate" and a "battle waged there," characterized by "seemingly modern features, with trenches along the entire combat front, barbed wire, machine-gun nests, and artillery." Hélio Silva mentioned dozens of dead, hundreds wounded and exhausted armies in the fighting at Morungava.

=== Recovery of memory ===
In 1999, the Estado de S. Paulo newspaper reported "a campaign by the residents of Itararé to tell their version of the battles", after many years in which the revolutions of 1930 and 1932 were taboo in the city. For Hélio Porto, "to deny the fighting in 1930, on the border between São Paulo and Paraná, is to deny the existence of the revolution that brought Getúlio Vargas to power". "Exaggerations aside, it can be said that there were important battles in that October of 1930". "If there had been no battle, there would have been no deaths". His historiographical proposal, in a book published in 2019, is to include the 1932 battle in the official memory of São Paulo.

For Hélio Tenório dos Santos, Itararé, Sengés, the Army and the Public Force of São Paulo were victims of defamation and their fame is unjustified. "Many people, without having the slightest notion of the events that occurred in Itararé in 1930, have immortalized the nickname of 'battle that never happened'. Sengés lost even more: it suffered as much from the fighting as Itararé, but was omitted from the event's name. He is of the opinion that 'in 1930 the Battle of Itararé took place, extending in time and space', which would be evident in the numbers of soldiers in combat, dead and wounded.

Among other sources in the 21st century with a different opinion from the mainstream one, one states that 'contrary to the repeated cynical references to 'the greatest battle that South America never had', heavy frontal engagements, followed by partial advances, did indeed transpire in this area from 12 October onwards, resulting in dozens of deaths and many more wounded and prisoners'. Another has nuances: the "Battle of Itararé is embedded in Brazilian folklore as the famous battle that never happened. Although it is said that during the so-called Revolution of 1930, which brought Getúlio Vargas to power, there were indeed several battles in the region between São Paulo and Paraná, and only the final confrontation, about which there was great expectation, in the aforementioned Itararé, was avoided through negotiations". And another, while mentioning the "battle that never happened", stated that "the people of Paraná also fought, and bravely, in Sengés and at the Morungava station and farm, in the strategic Itararé region".

=== Material traces ===
Trenches and remains of the battle were not preserved and a house hit by a artillery shot was demolished, but some traces remain. At Passo do Cipriano, four graves of Rio Grande do Sul soldiers, killed in 1930, remain. The railway disputed in 1930 no longer operates, and the tracks of the section between Sengés and Itararé were removed in 1993. The stations were demolished. Reforestation has made the area more inhospitable today than in the past. The region has already been identified as having potential for war archaeology in a thesis from the Museum of Archaeology and Ethnology of the University of São Paulo, since "battles between loyalist and revolutionary troops, in 1930, occurred in Sengés and Jaguaraíva in Paraná and the surroundings of Itararé".
