= Flavio Rogério =

Brazilian footballer (born 1976)

Flávio Rogério
Personal information
- Full name: Flávio Rogério Ribeiro
- Date of birth: 22 December 1976 (age 49)
- Place of birth: Siqueira Campos, Brazil
- Height: 1.75 m (5 ft 9 in)
- Position: Defender

Team information
- Current team: Real Apodaca (Assistant)

Senior career*
Years	Team	Apps	(Gls)
1995–2000	Coritiba	117	(1)
2001–2004	Monterrey		
2004–2005	Coritiba		
2006–2007	Dorados de Sinaloa		
2007–2008	Tigres		
2008–2009	Club Tijuana		
2010	Hermosillo		
2011	Puebla FC		

Managerial career
- 2023–: Real Apodaca (Assistant)
- * Club domestic league appearances and goals as of 17 May 2010

Flávio Rogério Ribeiro (born 22 December 1976, in Siqueira Campos), sometimes known as just Flávio, is a Brazilian former professional footballer who last played for Puebla of the Primera División de México. He is a Mexican naturalized citizen.

== Honors ==
=== Club ===
- Monterrey
  - Primera División de México, Clausura 2003
