= Marcos (footballer, born 1976) =

Brazilian footballer

Personal information
- Full name: Sebastião Marcos Barbosa de Oliveira
- Date of birth: 21 June 1976 (age 50)
- Place of birth: Siqueira Campos, Brazil
- Height: 1.87 m (6 ft 1 1/2 in)
- Position: Goalkeeper

Senior career*
| Years | Team | Apps | (Gls) |
| 1997–2002 | Paraná | 73 | (0) |
| 2003–2009 | Marítimo | 200 | (0) |
| 2009–2010 | Renate | | |
| 2010–2012 | Braga | 0 | (0) |
| 2012 | Feirense | 12 | (0) |
| 2013–2017 | Paraná | 89 | (0) |
| Total | | 377 | (0) |
- * Club domestic league appearances and goals

Sebastião Marcos Barbosa de Oliveira (born 21 June 1976), known as Marcos, is a Brazilian former professional footballer who played as a goalkeeper.

== Club career ==
Born in Siqueira Campos, Paraná, Marcos started his career with local side Paraná, appearing regularly during six years. In January 2003, he moved abroad, joining Portugal's Marítimo; a starter from his beginnings, he made his Primeira Liga debut in a 1–0 away loss against Vitória de Setúbal, and went on to draw comparisons to his compatriot Everton Machado who played in the island of Madeira from 1988 to 1996 with great success.

In the 2004–05 season, as Marítimo finished seventh with one of the strongest defensive records, Marcos was named Goalkeeper of the Year in the country. He continued to be the undisputed starter until his departure in 2009, at 33.

In July 2010, after one year in Italy with lowly Renate, Marcos returned to Portugal and signed with Braga, as the club had lost Eduardo and Paweł Kieszek in the off-season. He was released by the Minho side in January 2012, with only one competitive appearance to his credit, a 4–0 away win against Arouca in the 2010–11 edition of the Taça da Liga.

After being released by Braga, the 36-year-old Marcos joined Feirense of the Segunda Liga. He returned to his first club Paraná the following transfer window, achieving promotion to the Série A in 2017 and retiring immediately after; across his two spells, he appeared in an all-time best 367 matches for the team based at the Estádio Vila Capanema.
