= Barão de Itararé =

Brazilian journalist (1895–1971)

Apparício Torelly
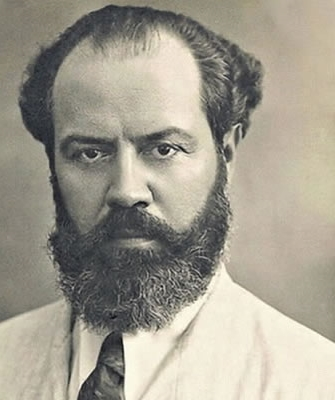
- Born: Apparício Fernando de Birkenhoff Torelly; 29 January 1895; Rio Grande, Rio Grande do Sul, Brazil
- Died: 27 November 1971 (aged 76); Rio de Janeiro
- Writing career
- Pen name: Barão de Itararé, Apporelly

Apparício Fernando de Brinkerhoff Torelly (29 January 1895 – 27 November 1971), also known as Apporelly and as the fake title of nobility of Barão de Itararé (Baron of Itararé), was a Brazilian journalist and writer.

Torelly was born in Rio Grande. He studied in a Jesuit boarding school in São Leopoldo and attended medical school, before dropping out. In 1925, Torelly moved to Rio de Janeiro, where he wrote for several newspapers, such as O Globo and A Manhã; there, he published humorous pieces, poking fun at politicians of the time. Torelly would leave A Manhã (The Morning) in 1926, founding his own humor newspaper, A Manha ( a pun with the former, meaning The Whining).

Torelly was a member of the Brazilian Communist Party. He was arrested in 1935 because of his ties with the party, then illegal. He was released one year later. When the party recovered its legal status, in 1947, Torelly ran for councilman in the Rio de Janeiro city elections.

== Origin of the title ==
During the Revolution of 1930, a rumor was spread that a battle would be fought in the city of Itararé between the federal troops loyal to president Washington Luís and the Getúlio Vargas' troops. The battle did not happen, and a compromise was reached between the two groups. Then Torelly adopted his self-styled nobility title, in honor of a battle that never happened.
