= São José da Boa Vista =

Coordinates: 23.9158°S 49.6519°W

- Municipality
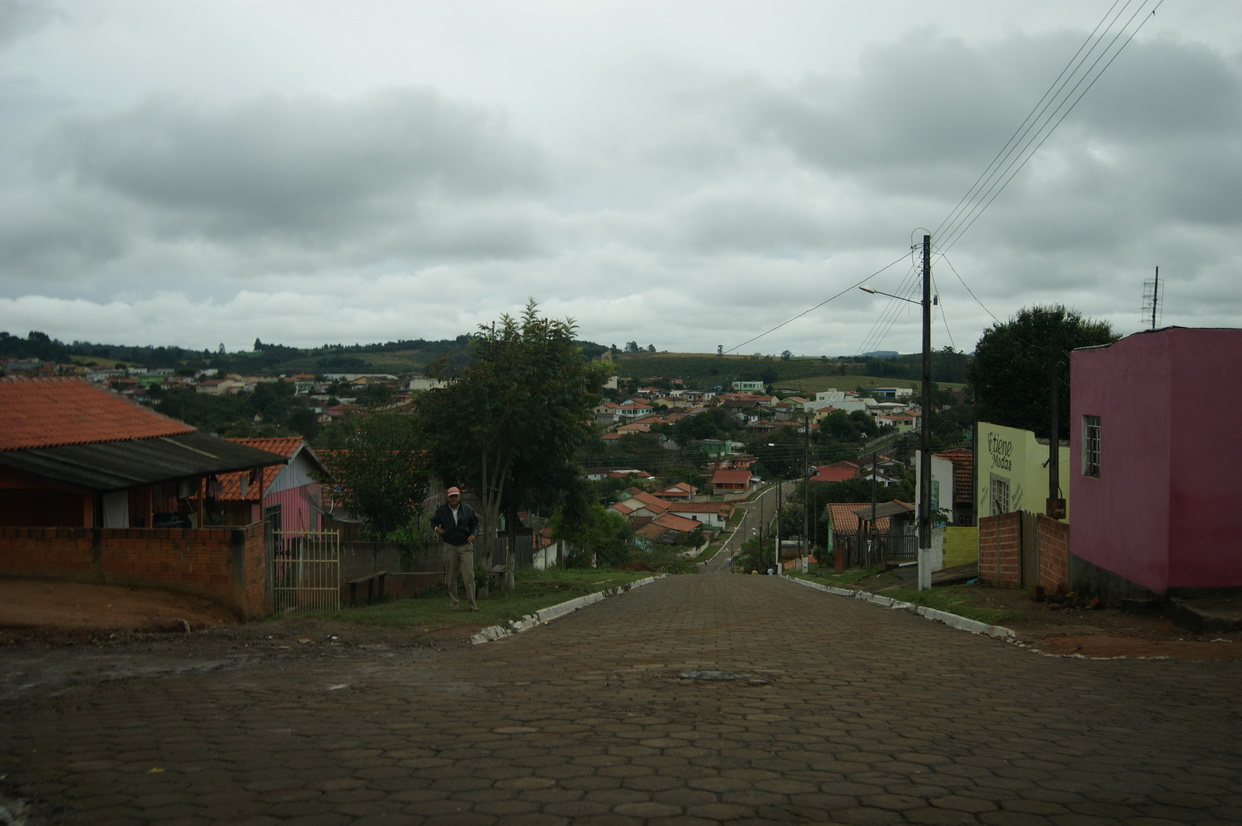

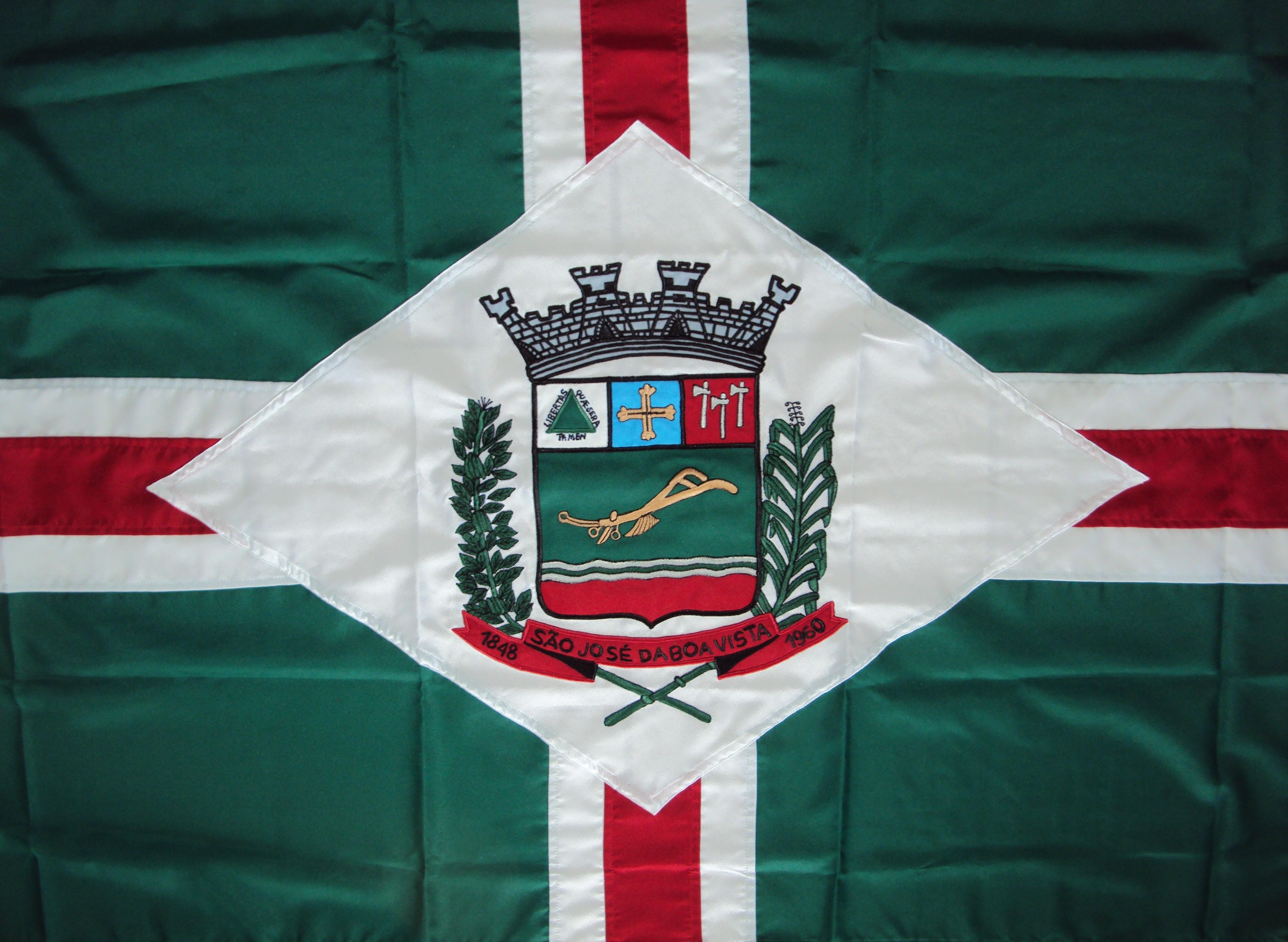
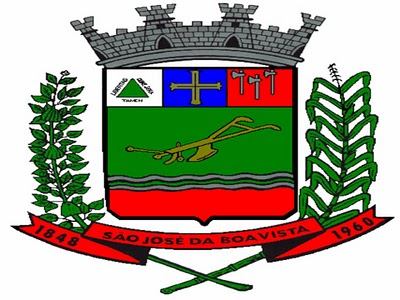
- Flag Coat of arms
- Interactive map of São José da Boa Vista
- Country: Brazil
- Region: Southern
- State: Paraná
- Mesoregion: Norte Pioneiro Paranaense

Population (2020)
  - Total: 6,160
- Time zone: UTC−3 (BRT)

São José da Boa Vista is a municipality in the state of Paraná in the Southern Region of Brazil.

== See also ==
- List of municipalities in Paraná
