= Quatiguá =

Coordinates: 23°35′S 49°55′W

- Municipality
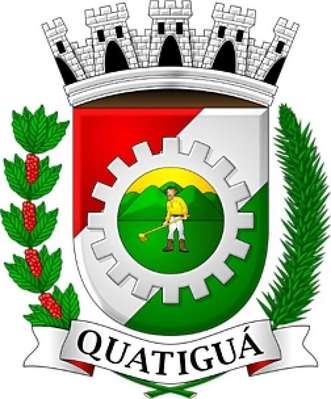
- Flag Coat of arms

- Country: Brazil
- Region: Southern
- State: Paraná
- Mesoregion: Norte Pioneiro Paranaense

Population (2020)
  - Total: 7,477
- Time zone: UTC−3 (BRT)

Quatiguá is a municipality in the state of Paraná in the Southern Region of Brazil.

== See also ==
- List of municipalities in Paraná
