= Siqueira Campos, Paraná =

Siqueira Campos
- Municipality
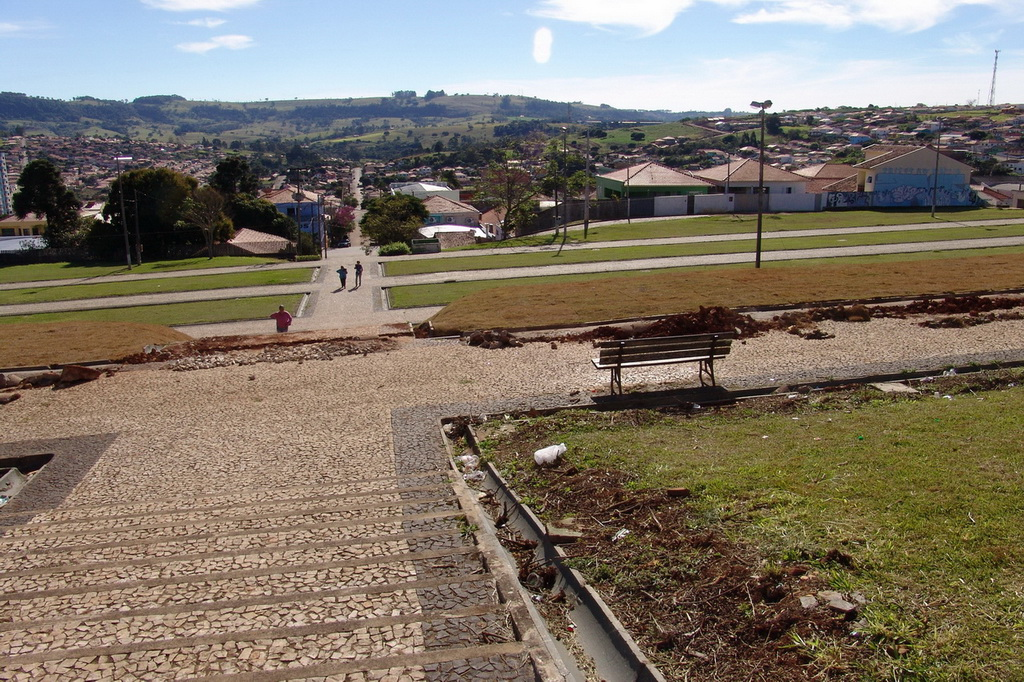

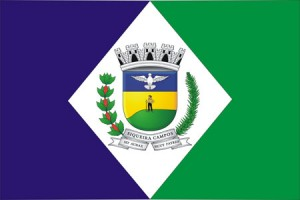
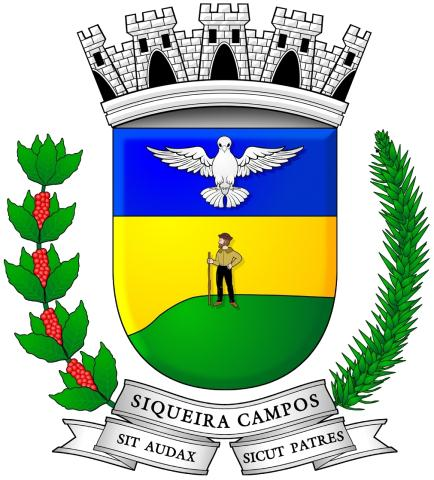
- Flag Coat of arms

- Location in Brazil
- Coordinates: 23°41′20″S 49°50′02″W
- Country: Brazil
- Region: Southern
- State: Paraná
- Mesoregion: Norte Pioneiro Paranaense

Population (2020)
  - Total: 21,249
- Time zone: UTC−3 (BRT)

Siqueira Campos is a municipality in the state of Paraná in the Southern Region of Brazil.

== See also ==
- List of municipalities in Paraná
