= Itararé =

- Municipality
- Municipality of Itararé
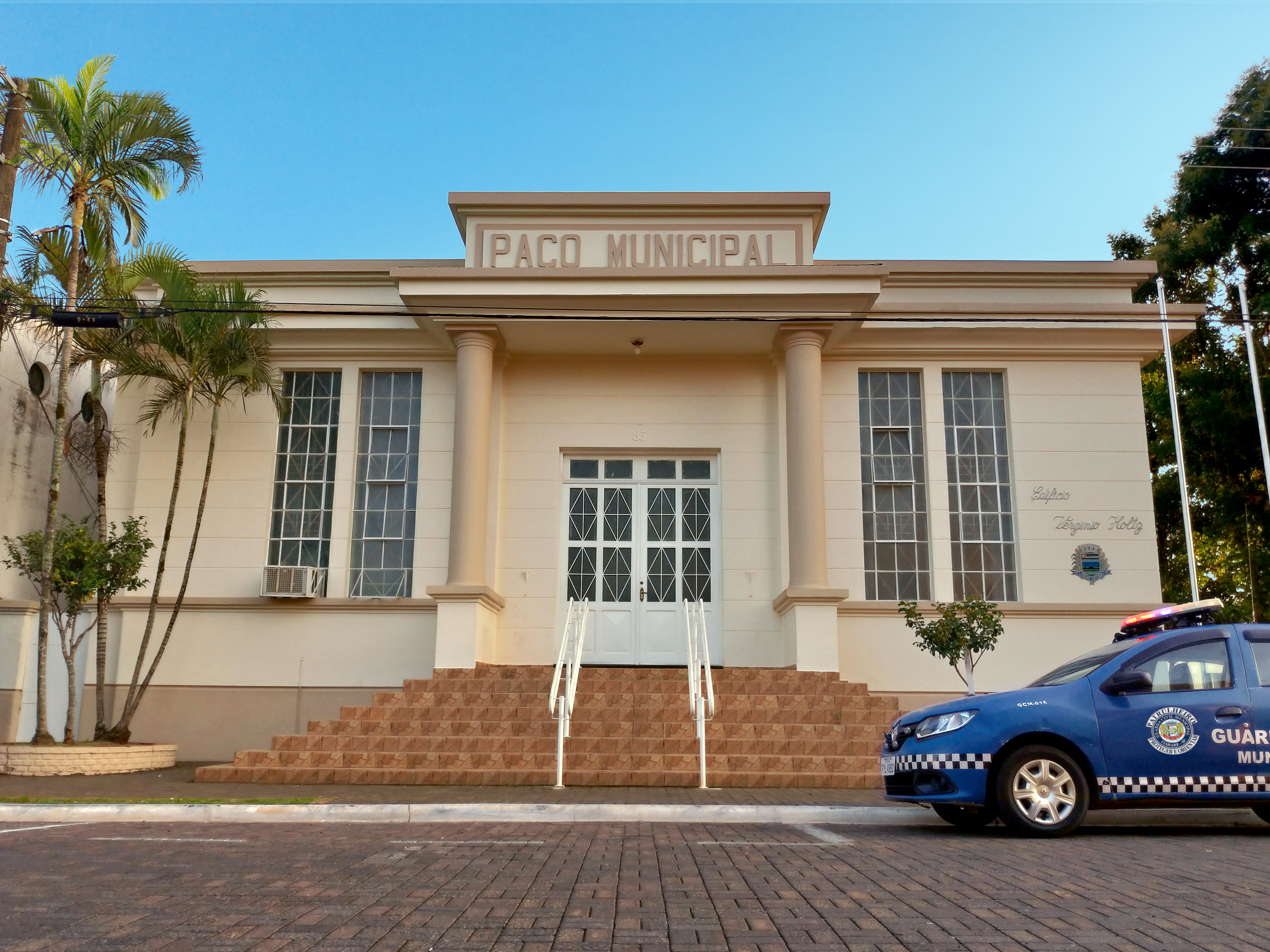
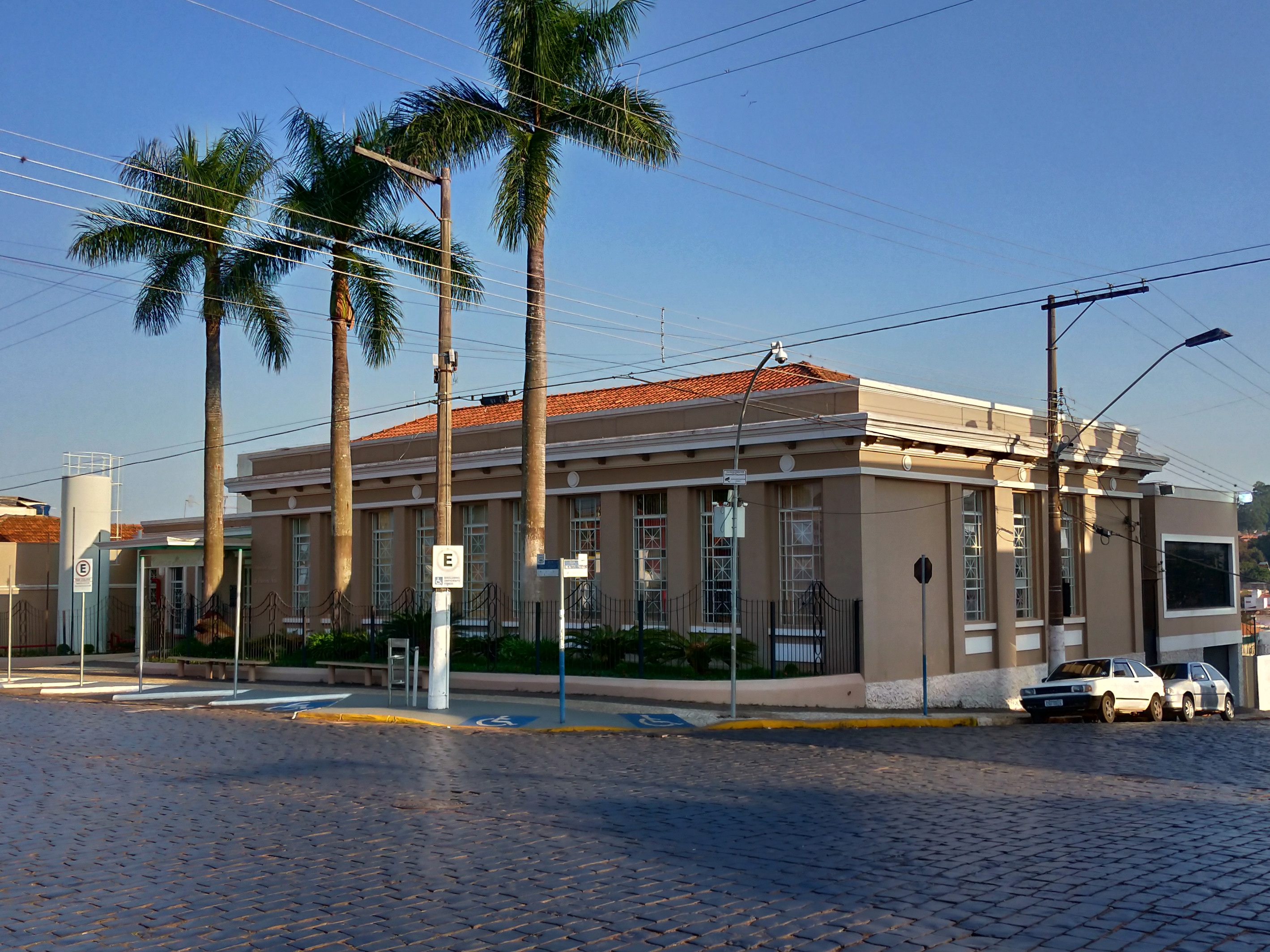
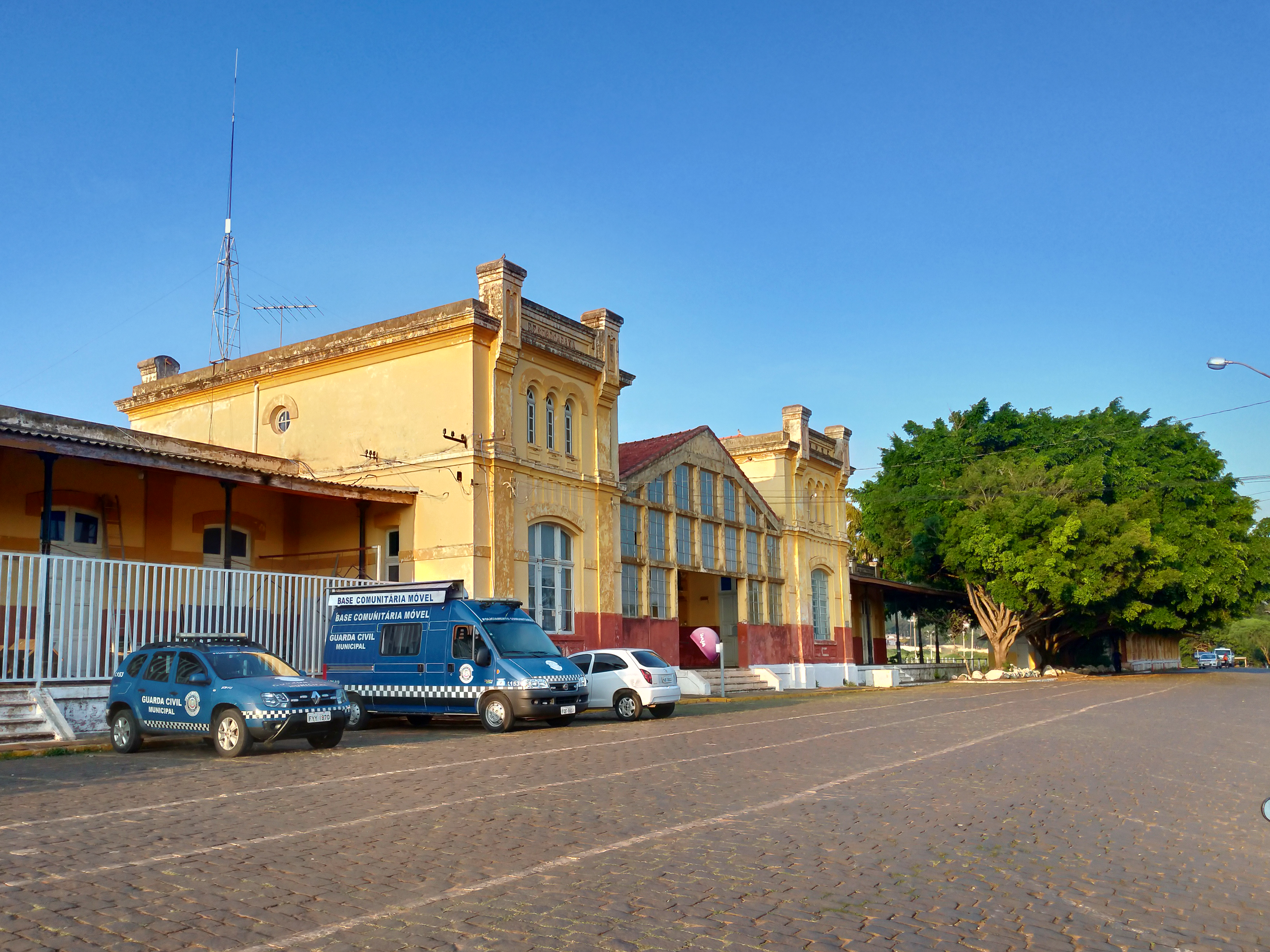
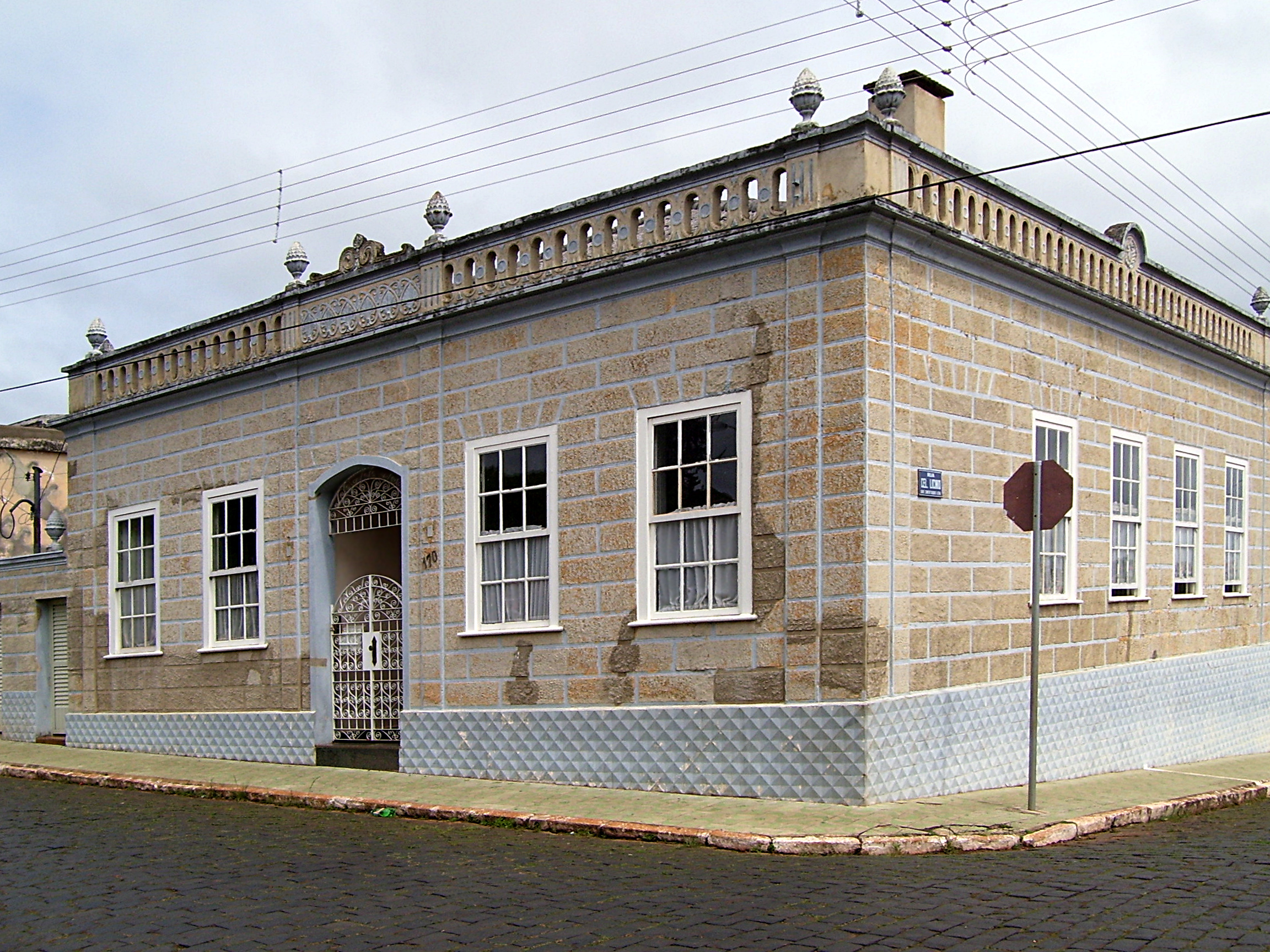
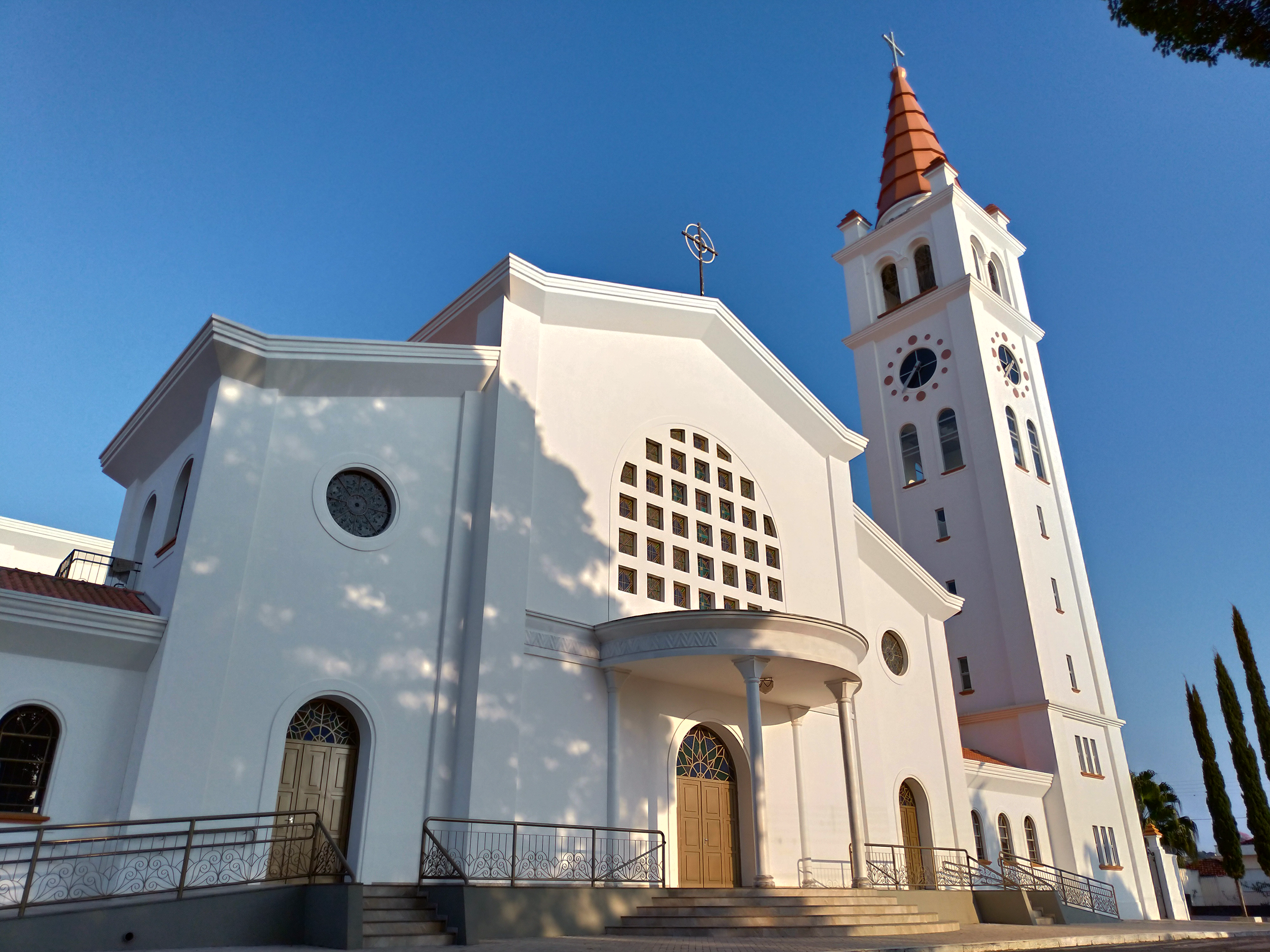
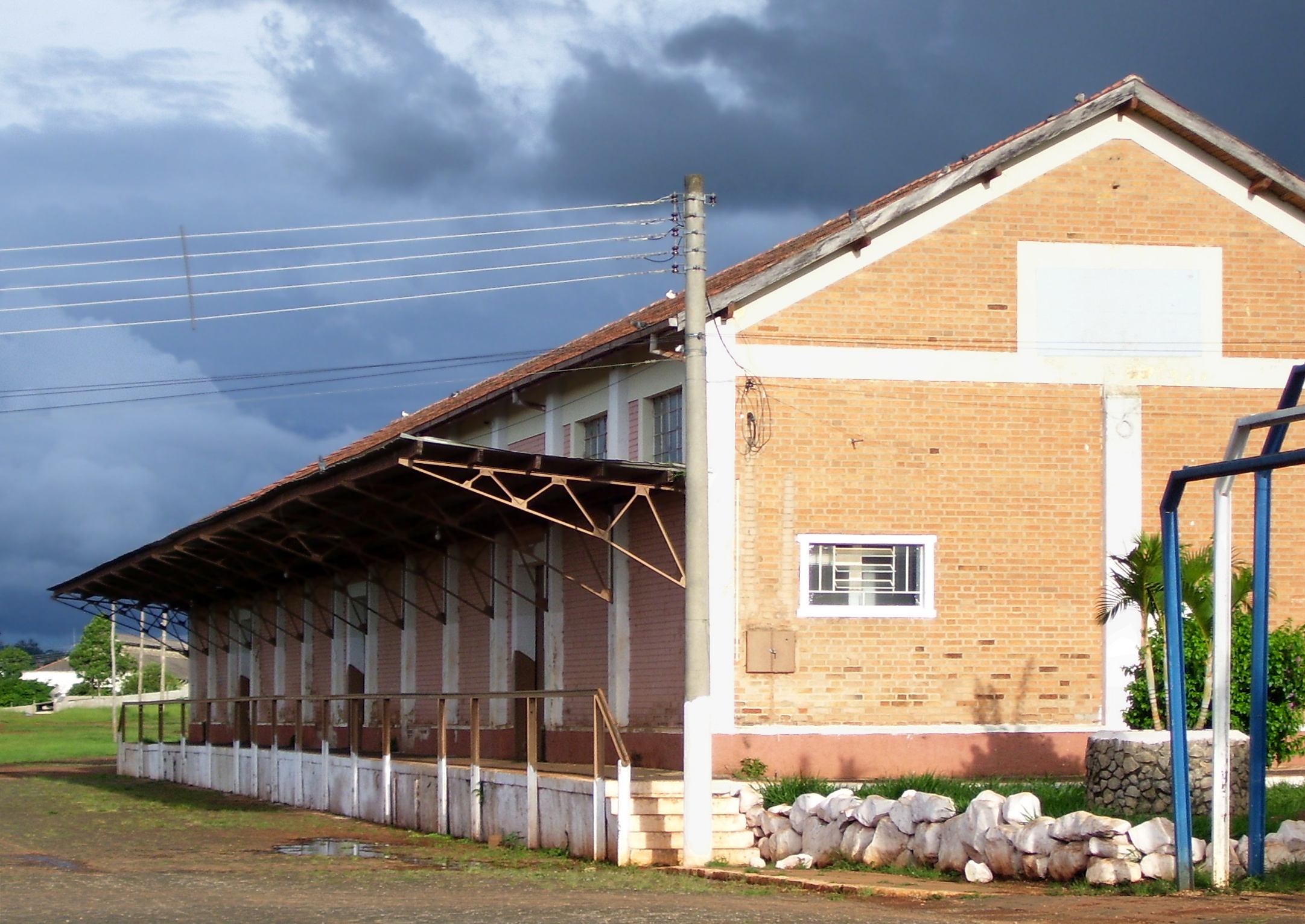

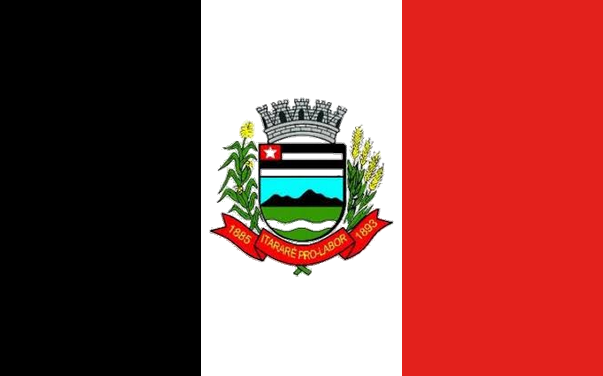
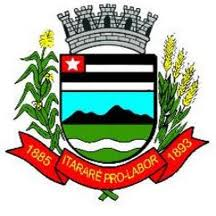
- Flag Coat of arms

- Location in São Paulo state

- Location in Brazil
- Coordinates: 24°6′45″S 49°19′54″W
- Country: Brazil
- Region: Southeast
- State: São Paulo

Area
  - Total: 1,004 km^{2} (388 sq mi)

Population (2020)
  - Total: 50,642
  - Density: 50.44/km^{2} (130.6/sq mi)
- Time zone: UTC−3 (BRT)
- HDI (2010): 0.703 – high
- Website: www.itarare.sp.gov.br

Itararé is a municipality in the state of São Paulo in Brazil. The population is 50,642 (2020 est.) in an area of 1,004 km^{2} (388 sq mi). Its elevation is of 740 metres (2,430 ft). This place's name comes from the Tupi language, and means "stone that the river has dug" because the Itararé River runs partly underground. Itararé became an independent municipality in 1893, when it was separated from Itapeva da Faxina.

== Media ==
In telecommunications, the city was served by Companhia de Telecomunicações do Estado de São Paulo until 1975, when it began to be served by Telecomunicações de São Paulo. In July 1998, this company was acquired by Telefónica, which adopted the Vivo brand in 2012.

The company is currently an operator of cell phones, fixed lines, internet (fiber optics/4G) and television (satellite and cable).

== See also ==
- List of municipalities in São Paulo
