= Prestes =

Prestes is a Portuguese surname. Notable people called Prestes include:

- Anita Leocádia Prestes (born 1936), Brazilian historian
- Francisco Prestes Maia (1896–1965), Brazilian urban planner and mayor of São Paulo
- Júlio Prestes (1882–1946), Brazilian poet, lawyer and politician
- Luís Carlos Prestes (1898–1990), Tenente, later communist militant and Brazilian politician
- Maria Prestes (1930–2022), Brazilian activist
- Olga Benário Prestes (1908–1942), German-Brazilian communist militant
- Paulão Prestes (born 1988), Brazilian basketball player
- Paulo Roberto Prestes (born 1988), Brazilian football player
- Vicentino Prestes de Almeida (1900–1953), Brazilian paleontologist

== See also ==
- Prestes Maia (building), a complex building of two tower blocks in São Paulo, Brazil
- Coluna Prestes, social rebel movement between 1925 and 1927 in Brazil, with links to Tenente revolts
- Estação Júlio Prestes, historic railroad station building in São Paulo, Brazil
- Fernando Prestes, municipality in the state of São Paulo in Brazil
- Luís Carlos Prestes, Sergipe, a village in the municipality of Carira, Sergipe, Brazil
