= Socialism in Brazil =

Socialism in Brazil is generally thought to trace back to the first half of the 19th century. There are documents evidencing the diffusion of socialist ideas since then, but these were individual initiatives with no ability to form groups with actual political activism.

== History ==
=== Old Republic (1889–1930) ===
In 1892, the First Socialist Congress of Brazil occurred in Rio de Janeiro. Later in the year in São Paulo, another Socialist Congress independent of the latter occurred and the Workers' Socialist Party (Partido Operário Socialista) was founded. This is considered to be the first socialist party in Brazil. Shortly thereafter, the Socialist Workers Party was founded. These events all took place in Rio de Janeiro within the same year. Also in 1892, Silvério Fontes, widely touted the first Brazilian Marxist, launched the Socialist Center of Santos. Santos published the socialist magazine A Questão Social (The Social Question) and newspaper O Socialista (The Socialist).

== Early socialist parties ==
The first major socialist party of the country was founded 1902 in São Paulo under the auspicious of Italian immigrant Alcebíades Bertollotti. Bertollotti was once responsible for Avanti, the official newspaper of the Italian Socialist Party. That same year in Rio de Janeiro, the Socialist Collective Party was founded by two individuals. One was Vicente de Sousa, a teacher at the Colégio Pedro II, and the other Gustavo Lacerda, a journalist and founder of the Brazilian Press Association. In 1906, the Independent Workers Party was founded, establishing a popular university that included Rocha Pombo, Manuel Bomfim, and José Veríssimo as teachers.

== Socialism during wartime ==
The diffusion of socialist ideas increased during World War I, but most of the Brazilian left-wing groups were still alienated from the general public. In June 1916, Francisco Vieira da Silva, Toledo de Loiola, Alonso Costa, and Mariano Garcia launched the Manifesto of the Brazilian Socialist Party. On May 1 of the following year, the Manifesto of the Socialist Party of Brazil was launched, signed by Nestor Peixoto de Oliveira, Isaac Izeckson, and Murilo Araújo. This group launched Evaristo de Morais to the House of Representatives and published two newspapers, Folha Nova (The New Leaf) and Tempos Novos (New Times), both short-lived.

In December 1919, the Socialist League (Liga Socialista) was formed in Rio de Janeiro. Its members started publishing the magazine Clarté in 1921, with the support of Evaristo de Morais, Maurício de Lacerda, Nicanor do Nascimento, Agripino Nazaré, Leônidas de Resende, Pontes de Miranda, among others. The group would extend its influence to São Paulo, with Nereu Rangel Pestana, and to Recife, with Joaquim Pimenta. In 1925 a new Brazilian Socialist Party (Partido Socialista do Brasil) was launched, also formed by the group led by Evaristo de Morais.

=== Communist competition ===
The foundation of the Brazilian Communist Party (Partido Comunista Brasileiro – PCB) in 1922 and its rapid growth suffocated the dozens of anarchist organizations which had played an important role in staging major strikes during the previous decade. PCB staged major strikes throughout the 1920s. Also during that period before the Revolution of 1930 and Getúlio Vargas' rise to power, Maurício de Lacerda launched the short-lived United Front of the Left (Frente Unida das Esquerdas), whose purpose was to write a draft socialist constitution for Brazil. The political agitation of the period included a movement in the tenente revolts context led by future communist leader Luís Carlos Prestes. Also, as part of the Tenente revolts, a short-lived commune was formed in Manaus. Prestes was invited by Vargas to lead the military efforts of his uprising against the São Paulo oligarchy, but he refused; he was against an alliance between tenentes and dissident oligarchs. He exiled himself to the Soviet Union and was admitted as a member of the PCB. In Moscow, he accepted the task, proposed by the Communist International, of leading a communist upheaval in Brazil.

=== Vargas Era (1930–1945) ===
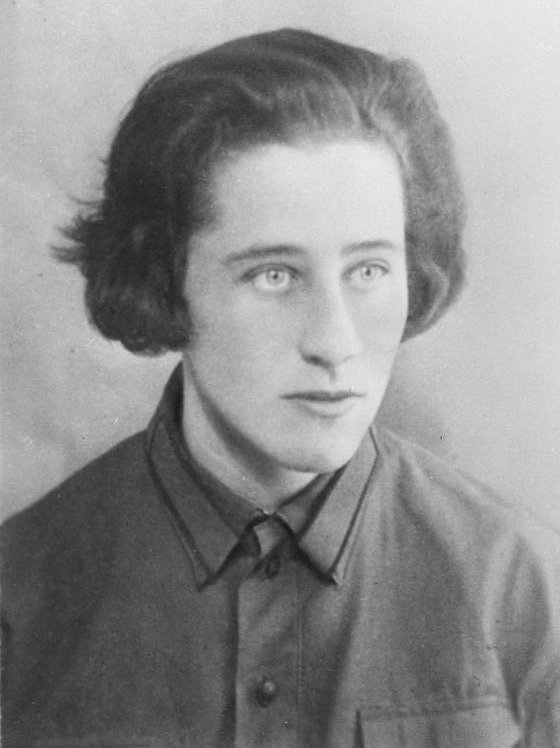
German-Brazilian militant Olga Benário Prestes (1908–1942).

Political activity was highly repressed during the Vargas regime. On November 23–27, 1935, Prestes' upheaval (Intentona Comunista) took place in Natal, Recife, and Rio de Janeiro almost simultaneously. It was led by the National Liberation Alliance (Aliança Nacional Libertadora – ANL), an organization that gathered anti-fascist (socialist, communist, liberal, progressive and nationalist) military officers. In Natal, the rebels even formed a military junta which ruled the city for four days. According to the official Vargas government account, the rebels killed 32 military officers in Rio de Janeiro, but the event is still questioned. The repression of the uprising resulted not only in the arrest of communist militants involved in it but also in the persecution of popular forces in general.

In 1936, Prestes and his wife, Olga Benário Prestes, then pregnant, were arrested as a result of their participation in the upheaval. Benário, a Jewish German-Brazilian communist militant, was deported by the Vargas regime to Nazi Germany. Benário was eventually killed at the Bernburg Euthanasia Centre in 1942; she had given birth at the facility a few years earlier and her daughter, Anita Leocádia Prestes, was handed to Brazilian authorities by the Nazis at age one. With her father still in jail upon her arrival in Brazil, she was raised by her paternal grandmother Leocádia Prestes. Another victim of the Vargas regime was the Italian-Brazilian anarchist Oreste Ristori, deported to the Kingdom of Italy in 1936 and killed by Fascist police officers on December 2, 1943.

In 1937, Vargas imposed a Fourth Constitution for the country, the so-called Polaca, after his government denounced that international military forces were trying to make a "socialist revolution" in Brazil, in what became known as the Cohen Plan. This false claim was a pretext for Vargas to perpetuate himself in power. Written by Justice Minister Francisco Campos, the Polaca was inspired by the authoritarian April Constitution of Poland, and was intended to consolidate the executive branch over the legislative and judiciary, implementing what became known as the Estado Novo regime. Polaca banned all political parties, implemented censorship in the press, and suppressed even further the organized movements of workers and of society in general.

== Post-war ==
=== Second Republic (1945–1964) ===
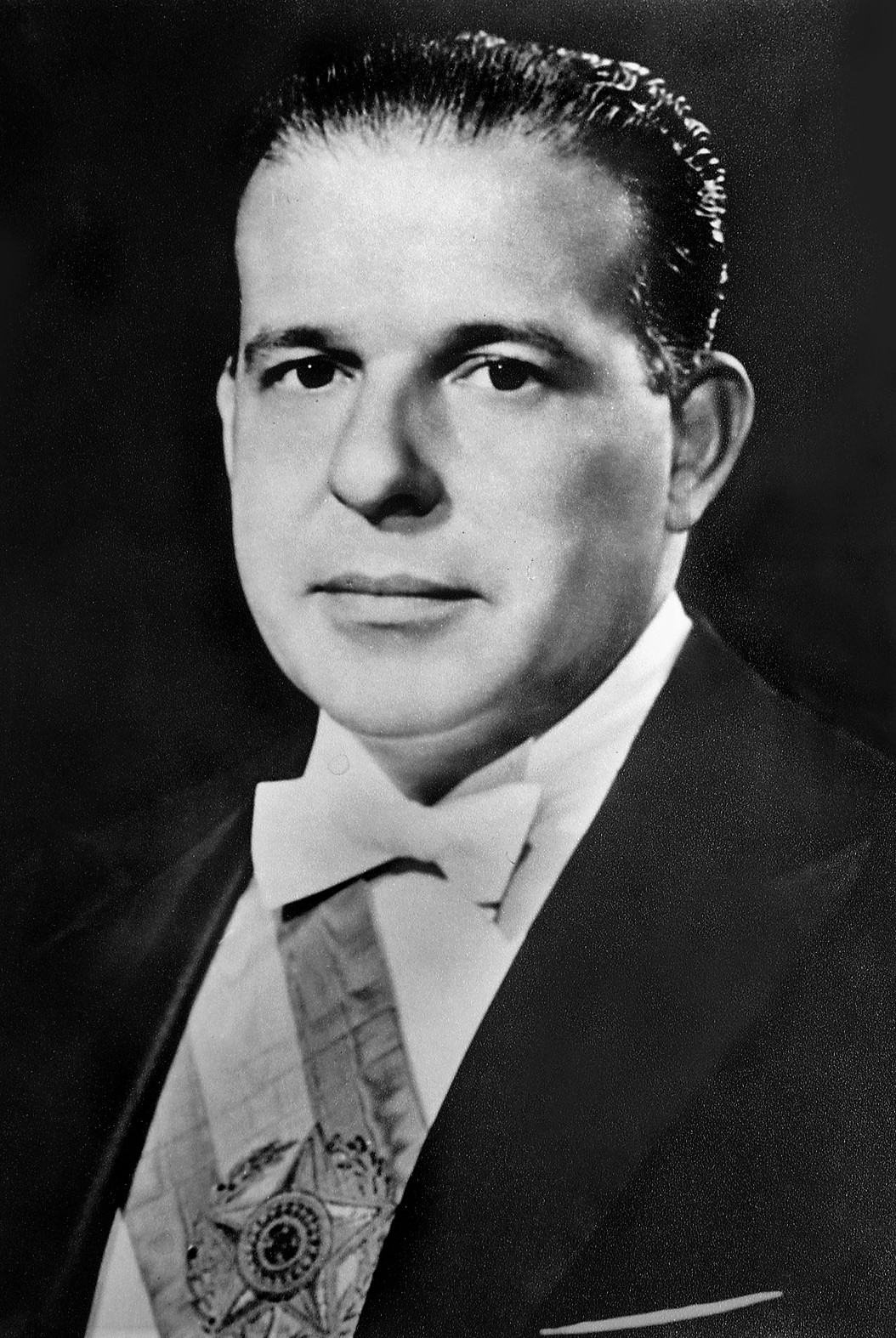
João Goulart, President of Brazil from 1961 to 1964.

After the end of the Vargas regime in 1945, socialist ideas started developing again in the Post-War period with the creation of the Democratic Left (Esquerda Democrática) party, which was eventually registered as the Brazilian Socialist Party (Partido Socialista Brasileiro – PSB) with the Electoral Justice Court in August 1947. The PCB was also re-legalized, but the fear of communism also increased among the middle and upper classes in the context of the Cold War.

In 1946, Luís Carlos Prestes became the first self-proclaimed communist Senator of Brazil, a feat which would only be repeated sixty years later, when Inácio Arruda was elected to represent Ceará. By 1947, the PCB had nearly 200,000 members, having received 480,000 votes (nearly 9% of the total) in that year's legislative election. The party, however, was denounced as being "internationalist, and therefore not committed to Brazil's own interests" by Eurico Gaspar Dutra in 1948, having its license revoked by the Electoral Justice Court. In 1956, clashes emerged in the party after Nikita Khrushchev denounced Joseph Stalin's policies at the 20th Congress of the Communist Party of the Soviet Union. The factionalization of the PCB accelerated after a new Manifesto was approved in 1958, proposing new ways of achieving communist goals, linking the establishment of socialism to the broadening of democracy. Some of its top leaders, dissatisfied with these guidelines, quit the PCB and formed a new party, Communist Party of Brazil (Partido Comunista do Brasil – PCdoB), in 1962. As a result, both parties claim to have been established in 1922.

In 1955, the Episcopal Conference of Latin America (Conselho Episcopal Latino Americano – CELAM) was created in Rio de Janeiro. It pushed the Second Vatican Council (1962–65) toward a more socially oriented stance. CELAM is the main basis for the foundation of Liberation theology, which would play a significant role on the Brazilian left in the following decades, before declining in the late 1990s.

In 1961, after the resignation of Jânio Quadros, Vice-President João Goulart, a social-democrat with popular reform proposals, took office. He would, however, rule the country de facto only in 1963, after a referendum ended the parliamentary system approved by the Congress to prevent the Military Forces from overthrowing him from office due to his progressive views. During Goulart's government, PSB's president João Mangabeira became Justice Minister. A military coup in 1964 deposed Goulart on charges that he was leading a socialist revolution with his Basic Reforms (Reformas de Base) program. Goulart's biggest political opponent – and coup supporter – was Carlos Lacerda, son of Maurício de Lacerda, founder of the PCB, who later joined the National Democratic Union (União Democrática Nacional – UDN), an anti-Communist party.

== Military dictatorship (1964–1985) ==
Workers' Party logo.

With the 1964 coup, all political parties were banned, and socialist organizations had to act clandestinely once again. The creation of bipartisanship in 1965 by a presidential decree allowed moderate left-wing politicians to join the Brazilian Democratic Movement (Movimento Democrático Brasileiro – MDB), the party of consented opposition to the military regime.

In the second half of the 1960s and all through the 1970s, socialists and other opposition groups to the military dictatorship suffered relentless persecution. The vast majority of militants in armed organizations that fought the regime professed socialist ideas, ranging from Leninism to Maoism. As during the Vargas dictatorship, the guerrilla warfare carried out by Communist groups was used by the regime's propaganda as a justification for repression. The slow redemocratization process initiated by Ernesto Geisel in the second half of the 1970s yielded its first gains in the following decade, when socialist and communist parties were once again able to organize freely and stand their own candidates.

In January 1979, at the XI Steelworkers Congress, the proposal to launch the Workers' Party (Partido dos Trabalhadores – PT), a democratic socialist party, was made. Its official foundation would occur a year later at the Catholic school Colégio Sion (Sion High School) in São Paulo. PT is a result of the approach between trade unionists of the Central Única dos Trabalhadores (CUT), intellectuals, artists, Catholics influenced by liberation theology, and the old Brazilian left. The party, however, can be described as a New Left party, once it refused "taking the path of the old Latin American left, in the form of the guerrilla movement or Stalinism".

In 1984, the Landless Workers' Movement was created as a reaction to the military regime's failed land reform program. This socialist group grew rapidly, becoming the largest social movement organization in Latin America, with an estimated 1.5 million members organized in 23 out of Brazil's 26 states. PT and MST have been closely linked to each other since the mid-1980s, but have grown apart in recent years.

== New Republic (1985–present) ==
In 1988, rubber tapper, unionist, and environmental activist Chico Mendes, a member of the PT and an activist for the preservation of the Amazon rainforest was assassinated in his house in Xapuri, Acre. He is recognized today as one of the first leaders of the Brazilian eco-socialism movement.

In the 1989 election, the PT formed a socialist coalition with the PSB and PC do B and had Luiz Inácio Lula da Silva as its presidential candidate. Although opposed because of his land reform proposals, Lula declared that neither he nor his party had ever been Marxist in a televised debate. The democratic socialist Democratic Labour Party (Partido Democrático Trabalhista – PDT), the only Brazilian member of the Socialist International, which claimed to be the actual heir of Goulart's and Vargas' Brazilian Labour Party (Partido Trabalhista Brasileiro – PTB), launched Leonel Brizola as its presidential candidate. Lula narrowly beat Brizola in the first-round and went on to the second round of the election, losing to neoliberal candidate Fernando Collor de Mello.

=== In the 21st century ===
After two unsuccessful attempts (losing both to Fernando Henrique Cardoso, a Social-Democrat, who soon adhered to the Third Way neoliberal agenda), Lula was eventually elected in 2002. In spite of criticism of his government for alliances with right-wing politicians and practicing some unorthodox neoliberal politics. Even so, Brazilians were overwhelmingly supporting a candidate and a party that harshly criticized the pro-capitalist orthodoxies of neoliberalism and contemporary globalization. This caused the departure of some factions of the PT; Lula claims he still has "socialist skills". After a pension reform that removed social rights, in addition to the establishment of alliances with the Brazilian Republican Party and the Liberal Party, a major departure from his government and his party was from the group that created the Socialism and Liberty Party (Partido Socialismo e Liberdade – PSOL). In general, the left criticized the Lula government, especially its economic policy.

In 2010, PT's Dilma Rousseff was elected the first female President of Brazil. During her term, Rousseff maintained a majority approval rating throughout her first term. There were widespread protests for better living standards (for example, in 2016, even after more than a decade of socialist rule, the general tax system still remained regressive.); nevertheless, her first government was approved by 63% of Brazilians, while her personal approval rating was at 79%, a personal high. Rousseff was also cited as the preferred candidate for 58% of the voters in the 2014 presidential election, in which she was reelected. Just in 2015, Rousseff's popularity began to decline, and in February 2015, a month before the 2015–2016 protests in Brazil began, Rousseff's approval rating dropped 19 points to 23%, with 44% disapproving of her, which ended up resulting in Dilma Rousseff's impeachment process. Dilma Rousseff lost the impeachment battle but won a separate Senate vote that intended to ban her from public office for eight years. She added: "They convicted an innocent person and carried out a parliamentary coup."

The president who succeeded Dilma Rousseff was Michel Temer, who brought great names from historical communism to compose his government, such as Roberto Freire (Ministry of Culture) and Raul Jungmann (Ministry of Defence).

In April 2018, former President Lula was arrested as part of the large-scale anti-corruption Operation Car Wash on charges of money laundering and corruption, just months before that year's general election, of which he was the frontrunner. Under Brazil's Clean Record Law, candidates who have been convicted by a decision of a collective body are ineligible to run for eight years, and so the arrest effectively ended Lula's candidacy. His party put forward former Mayor of São Paulo Fernando Haddad as their official candidate on August 31, with Federal Deputy Manuela D'Ávila as his running mate, solidifying an alliance with the Communist Party of Brazil. The Haddad-d'Ávila ticket would lose the general election to far-right candidate Jair Bolsonaro, marking the strong shift in Brazilian politics since Lula's re-election victory in 2002.

== List of Socialist and social democratic parties in Brazil ==
=== Major ===
The following parties have more than 350,000 members:

- Brazilian Socialist Party (PSB)
- Communist Party of Brazil (PCdoB)
- Democratic Labour Party (PDT)
- Socialism and Liberty Party (PSOL)
- Workers' Party (PT)

=== Minor ===
The following parties have less than 350,000 members and, amongst them, only the Socialism and Liberty Party is represented in the Chamber of Deputies:

- Brazilian Communist Party (PCB)
- Popular Unity (UP)
- United Socialist Workers' Party (PSTU)
- Workers' Cause Party (PCO)

=== Non-registered ===
The following parties are not legally recognized by the Superior Electoral Court and, therefore, are not allowed to participate in elections:

- Revolutionary Communist Party

== Personalities ==
The socialist movement in Brazil includes names like:

- Florestan Fernandes, Vânia Bambirra and Ruy Mauro Marini in sociology
- Milton Santos in geography
- Caio Prado Júnior in historiography
- Theotônio dos Santos and Paul Singer in economics
- Graciliano Ramos and Jorge Amado in literature
- Paulo Freire and Ruy Fausto in philosophy
- Luís Carlos Prestes, Carlos Marighella and Manuela d'Ávila in politics
