= Honório de Freitas Guimarães =

Member of the Brazilian Communist Party (1902–1968)

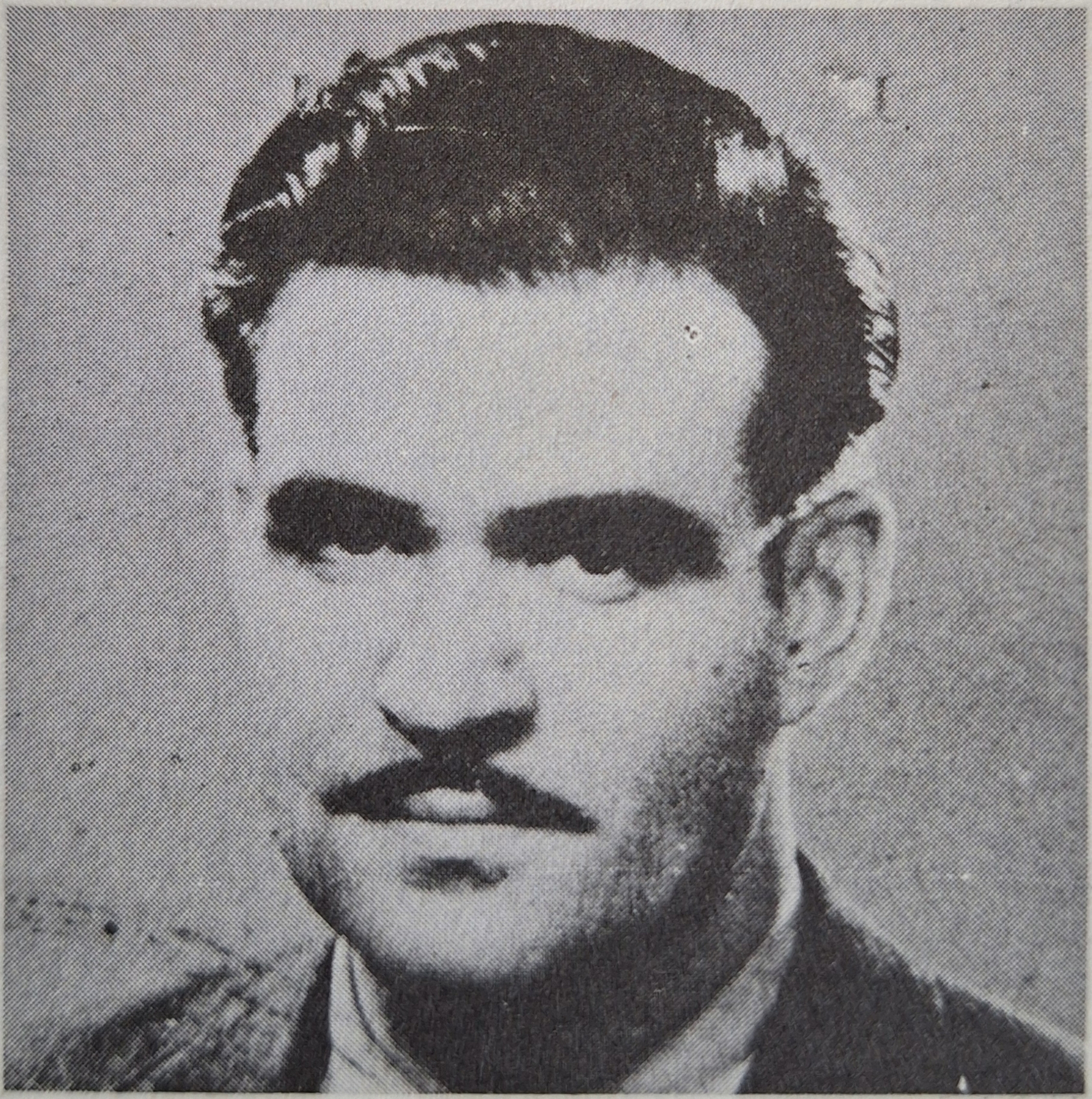
- Born: 8 July 1902 (Note: His baptismal record, dated 23 December 1906, indicates 15 October 1902 as the date of birth; his marriage record to Maria de Figueiredo corroborates the date of 8 July 1902.); Petrópolis, Rio de Janeiro, Brazil
- Died: 1 February 1968 (aged 65); Volta Redonda, Rio de Janeiro, Brazil

Honório de Freitas Guimarães (8 July 1902 – 1 February 1968) was a member of the Brazilian Communist Party (PCB). He used the aliases M., Martins, Nico, and Henrique Vieira de Sousa. Born into a family of farmers and sugar mill owners, Guimarães was descended from Brazilian nobility. During his adolescence, he studied at Eton College, and upon returning to Brazil, he became involved with socialism and communism under the influence of his first wife, who had been part of the intellectual circles in Paris at the time. Guimarães joined the PCB in 1931 and played a role in planning the Brazilian communist uprising of 1935, which ultimately failed. Arrested in 1938–1939, he was released in 1945 following amnesty for political prisoners. Guimarães did not rejoin the PCB and died in a car accident at the age of 65.

He participated in the execution of the teenager Elza Fernandes, strangled with a clothesline and buried inside a burlap sack.

== Early life ==
Honório de Freitas Guimarães was born in Petrópolis on 8 July 1902 to Álvaro de Freitas Guimarães, a prosecutor and judge, and Maria Emília Carneiro Leão de Barros Guimarães. Through his mother, Guimarães was the great-grandson of the Baron of São João de Icaraí and the great-great-grandson of the Marquis of Paraná. He belonged to a family of farmers and sugar mill owners in Rio de Janeiro, specifically in the cities of Niterói and Barra Mansa.

In 1910, his father was removed from the public office he held for supporting Rui Barbosa's candidacy for the presidency of Brazil. With money from his mother, his family moved to Europe, initially in Paris and, starting in 1914, in England, where he enrolled in Eton College. Guimarães completed the course five years later. He returned to Brazil and enrolled in the Polytechnic School of Rio de Janeiro, but abandoned the course in late 1921. In pursuit of financial independence, Guimarães joined the first class of the Reserve Officers' Training Center (Centro de Preparação de Oficiais da Reserva) and underwent a training period of over six months as a sergeant. During the Revolt of the 18 of Copacabana Fort, he defended the barracks where he had served, engaging in combat against the rebels.

In late 1922, Guimarães joined a mining expedition along the Garças River in Pernambuco, and he remained there until the beginning of 1924. During the second tenentist uprising, he volunteered and headed to São Paulo, where he stayed for a few days. Guimarães returned to Rio de Janeiro, and subsequently, his battalion was demobilized. In the following years, he resumed mining activities, this time in Minas Gerais and Goiás. He also worked conducting inspections on farms for a British mortgage company, and by the end of 1928, he served as the superintendent of a fruit plantation owned by the Guinle family in Queimados, Nova Iguaçu. Guimarães ventured into an orange export business but did not achieve success.

== Communist activities ==
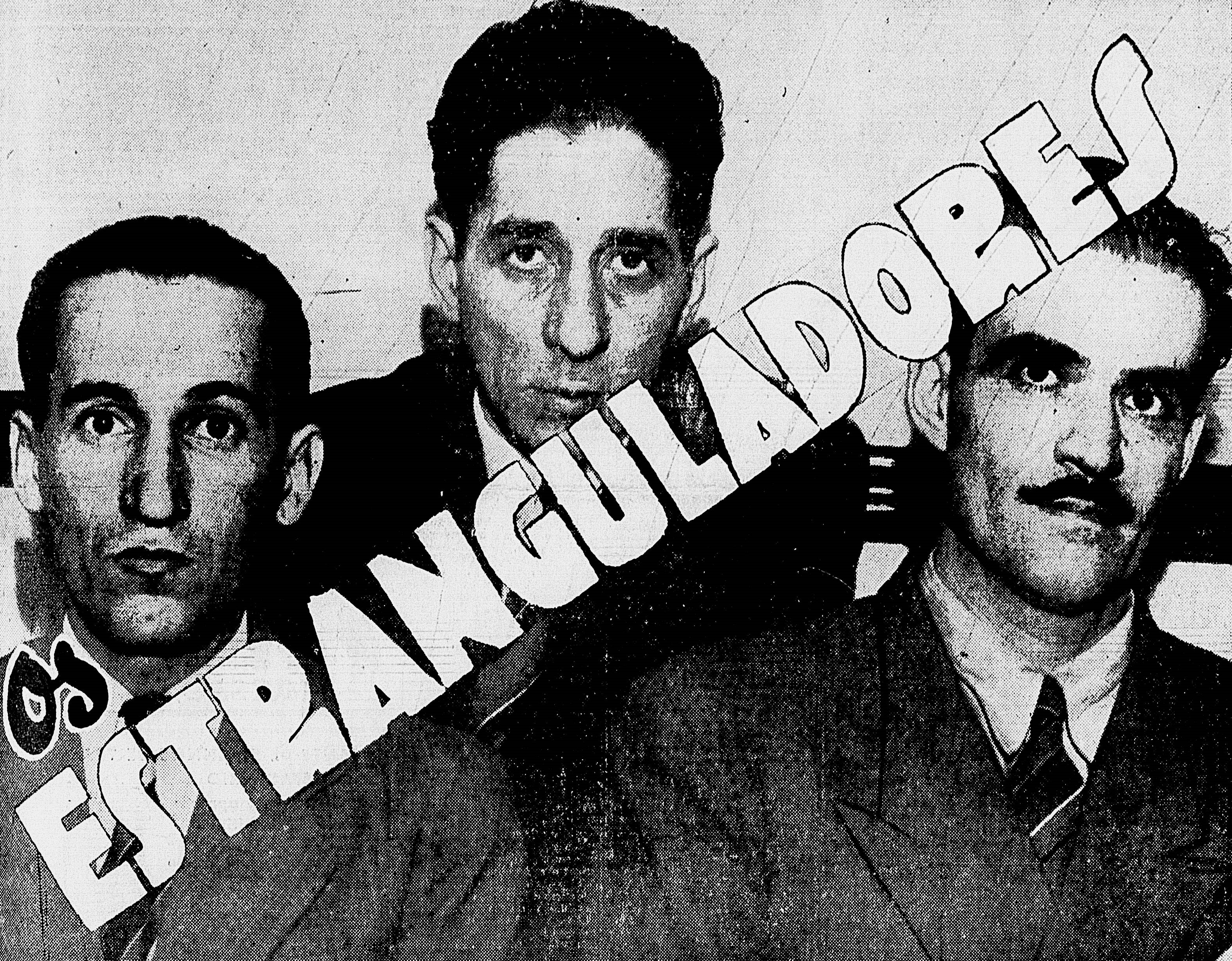
Guimarães (right) in the newspaper A Noite; it reads "the stranglers" (os estranguladores).

Honório de Freitas Guimarães was married to Maria de Figueiredo, the youngest daughter of the Count of Figueiredo. Maria had been part of the intellectual circles in Paris at the time, and as a result, around 1925, Guimarães became interested in socialism and communism. He also sympathized with the Prestes Column. After the Revolution of 1930, he went to Buenos Aires with his brother-in-law to establish contact with Luís Carlos Prestes and help him revive the Revolutionary Action League, created in July 1930 in the same city with the aim of implementing the anti-imperialist agrarian revolution.

Guimarães returned to Brazil and became associated with the Brazilian Communist Party (PCB), joining it in late 1931 and taking on the role of mimeograph technician and general services. He also worked with Eucina de Lacerda, the wife of Fernando de Lacerda, prominent members within the PCB. Guimarães became part of the national secretariat of the PCB in early 1934, with Antônio Maciel Bonfim serving as the secretary-general at the time. Later on, he also became a part of the central committee. Guimarães participated in the planning of the Brazilian communist uprising of 1935, although he did not agree with it. The armed movement failed, and the leadership of the PCB ordered the execution of Antônio Maciel Bonfim's consort, Elza Fernandes, on suspicion of betrayal. Guimarães became involved in her execution.

The Brazilian communist uprising of 1935 was followed by a strong repression against all government opponents. Guimarães took over the position of secretary-general of the PCB for a few months after the arrest of several members, replacing Miranda. He clandestinely traveled to Moscow in 1937, returned to Brazil in 1939, and was arrested at the end of that year and the beginning of 1940. Guimarães was sentenced by the National Security Tribunal to approximately 30 years in prison. While imprisoned on Ilha Grande, he attempted suicide and escapes until he was allowed to reside in a house near the prison with his second wife, Maria Nazaré Nunes Guimarães, and his children. Two of his children died there. The Duke of Gloucester and Leopold of Belgium, his colleagues at Eton, requested the release of Guimarães.

== Later years and death ==
In April 1945, 600 political prisoners were granted amnesty, among them Honório de Freitas Guimarães. He did not rejoin the Brazilian Communist Party, instead focusing on agricultural activities in Santa Maria Madalena. In 1952, he became the owner of a clog workshop and a transport company in Macaé, also engaging in the fabric trade. In 1964, he returned to Rio de Janeiro to manage his mother's assets. Guimarães died on 1 February 1968 as a result of polytrauma following a car accident on Presidente Dutra Highway, more specifically in the city of Volta Redonda. According to his death certificate, he would be buried in São João Batista Cemetery. He had two children from his first marriage, with Maria de Figueiredo, and seven from the second, with Maria Nazaré Nunes Guimarães. (Note: His death certificate states he "left behind seven children"; two of them died on Ilha Grande.)
