= Rodolfo Ghioldi =

Argentine politician (1891–1985)

Rodolfo José Ghioldi
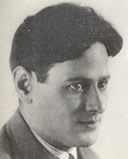
- Rodolfo Ghioldi, c. 1930s

Secretary-general of the Communist Party of Argentina
- In office 1918–1924
- Preceded by: Luis Emilio Recabarren
- Succeeded by: Moisey Kantor

Personal details
- Born: 21 January 1891 Buenos Aires, Argentina
- Died: 3 July 1985 (aged 94) Buenos Aires, Argentina
- Party: Communist Party of Argentina (1917–1985)
- Other political affiliations: Socialist Party of Argentina (1915–1917)
- Occupation: Journalist, historian

Rodolfo José Ghioldi (21 January 1891 – 3 July 1985) was an Argentine politician and journalist who was general-secretary of the Communist Party of Argentina from 1918 to 1924.

== Biography ==
Ghioldi was born in to the family of an Italian socialist immigrant who was a follower of Giuseppe Garibaldi. Ghioldi worked as a teacher until 1916 when he was dismissed from teaching because of his militant activities.

Ghioldi was one of the founding members of the Communist Party of Argentina, at the time the International Socialist Party, broke away from the Socialist Party after the October Revolution in Russia. Ghioldi was elected vice-president of the Federation of Socialist Youth (now the Communist Youth Federation) on 21 August 1917. After the party was admitted to the Communist International, Ghioldi was elected as its general secretary.

As a representative of the South American Secretariat of the Communist International, he participated in the communist uprising in Brazil, an uprising to overthrow the regime of Getúlio Vargas, which led to his imprisonment after its failure. In a 2025 article, Anita Leocádia Prestes (the daughter of Luís Carlos Prestes, who led the uprising) accused Ghioldi of betraying his comrades to the police, including her father and his driver, Victor Allen Barron. Rio de Janeiro police chief Filinto Müller claimed that it was Barron who betrayed Prestes, and after Barron fell from the window of the police station to his death it was ruled a suicide.

After years living in exile, Ghioldi returned to Argentina in 1940 with the hopes of building an anti-fascist and democratic front, which led to his arrest and imprisonment. After his release he resumed political activities and took leadership of the party newspaper La Hora. In 1951 he suffered an assassination attempt. In 1957 he participated in the Constituent Assembly as a representative of Santa Fe that repealed the Peronist constitution of 1949.

From the 1970s onwards Ghioldi mostly worked as a journalist and historian, he was designated as an honorary doctor of the Institute of the International Workers' Movement of the Academy of Sciences of the USSR in 1977, and decorated in the Soviet Union with the Order of the "October Revolution" in 1972 and in 1977 with the Order of the "Friendship of Peoples".
