= Tenentism =

Brazilian military political philosophy of the 1920s

Tenente revolts
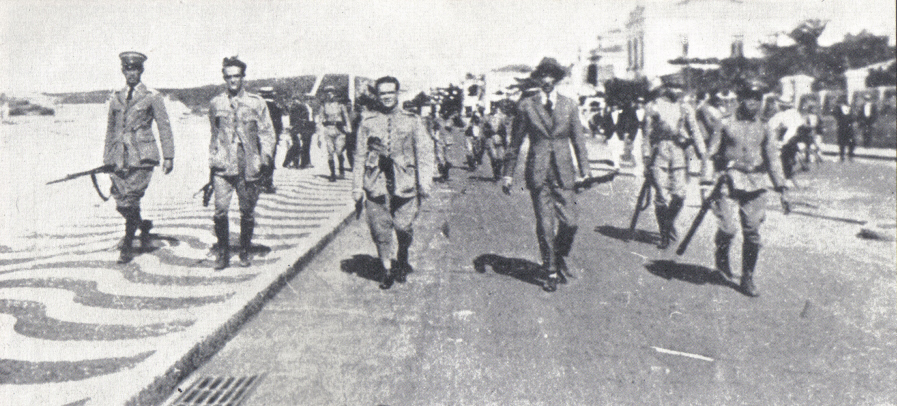
- The tenentes after leaving Fort Copacabana on 6 July 1922
| Date | 1922–1930 |
| Location | Brazil |
| Result | Revolution of 1930 |

Belligerents
| Rebels: Military personnel (Army, Navy and Public Forces); Armed civilians | Brazilian government: Brazilian Army; Brazilian Navy; Public Forces; Armed civilians |

Commanders and leaders
| Isidoro Dias Lopes; Joaquim Távora †; Miguel Costa; Luís Carlos Prestes; Euclides da Fonseca; Siqueira Canpos; Eduardo Gomes; Nílton Prado †; Ribeiro Junior; Juarez Távora | Epitácio Pessoa; Artur Bernardes; Washington Luís; Carlos de Campos; César do Rego Monteiro; Setembrino de Carvalho; Abílio Noronha; Eduardo Sócrates; Mena Barreto; Fernando Prestes |

Tenentism (Portuguese: tenentismo) was a political philosophy of junior army officers (tenentes, IPA: [teˈnẽtʃis], "lieutenants"), generally from the burgeoning middle class and unsatisfied with the oligarchic structure of the republic. This philosophy significantly contributed to the Revolution of 1930 that ended the First Brazilian Republic.

The movement advocated reforms in the country's power structure, among which the end of open ballot system (the end of the so-called vote of cabresto), a voting method that favored the coronelismo present in the Oligarchic Republic, in addition to defending the institution of secret ballots, universal suffrage and reform in public education.

== Background ==
The first decades of the 20th century saw marked economic and social change in Brazil. With industrialization on the rise, the federal government — dominated by the coffee oligarchs and the old order of café com leite politics and coronelismo — came under threat from the political aspirations of new urban groups: the proletariat, government and white-collar workers, merchants, bankers, and industrialists. In parallel, growing prosperity encouraged a rapid rise of a new working class of Southern and Eastern European immigrants who contributed to the growth of trade unionism, anarchism, and socialism in Brazil. In the post-World War I period, Brazil saw its first wave of general strikes and the establishment of the Communist Party in 1922.

A new class of junior army officers (Portuguese: tenentes) had emerged. They were trained in European war standards and believed themselves superior to their senior officers who still held antiquated ideas of the past. In addition, various senior officers had become complacent or sided with the government and its political structure, which sparked criticism from the tenentes.

Meanwhile, the divergence of interests between the coffee oligarchs and the burgeoning, dynamic urban sectors was intensifying. According to historian Benjamin Keen, the task of transforming society "fell to the rapidly growing urban bourgeois groups, and especially to the middle class, which began to voice even more strongly its discontent with the rule of the corrupt rural oligarchies". In contrast, despite a wave of general strikes in the post-war years, the labour movement remained small and weak, lacking ties to the peasantry, who constituted the overwhelming majority of the Brazilian population. As a result, rather disparate and disjointed social reform movements cropped up in the 1920s.

== July 1922: the first revolt ==
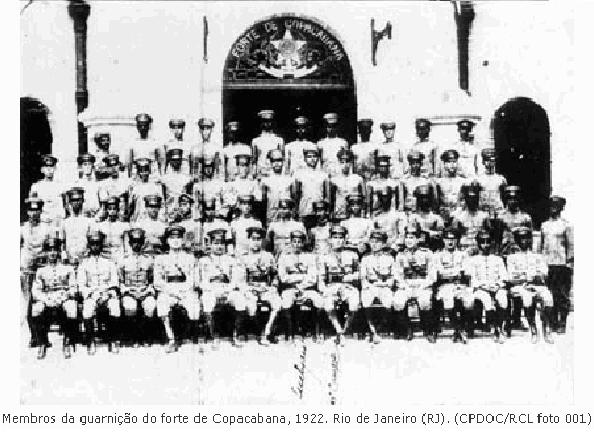
The Copacabana Fort garrison in 1922

What became known as the tenentist movement came to public notice on 5 July 1922 when a group of young army officers began a rebellion against the First Brazilian Republic at Fort Copacabana in Rio de Janeiro. Sparked initially by the punishment and brief imprisonment of marshal Hermes da Fonseca by president Epitácio Pessoa, the tenentes attempted to prevent Artur Bernardes, winner of the 1922 presidential election, from taking office. The tenentes demanded various forms of social modernization, calling for agrarian reform, the formation of cooperatives, and the nationalization of mines.

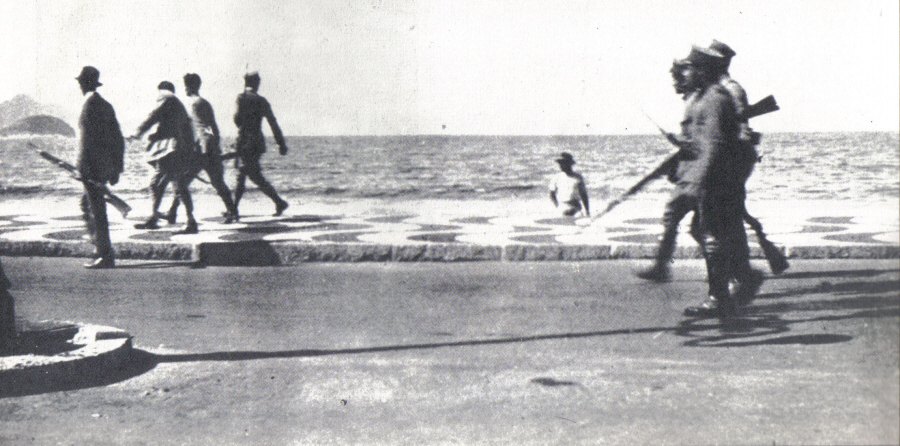
6 July 1922: The '18 of the Copacabana Fort revolt' on their way to confront army loyalists

Their early-morning rebellion was taken up by a garrison in São Paulo but not by others; only "scattered units around Rio de Janeiro revolted: the Escola Militar, some elements of the First Infantry Regiment and the Battalion of Engineers, and the garrisons of Forts Copacabana and Vigia. However, the remainder of the First Army Division stayed loyal and, with General Setembrino de Carvalho supervising the operations, easily crushed the revolt". Twenty-four hours later, just 200 rebels remained when the navy dreadnought Minas Geraes shelled the Copacabana barracks, after which two navy aircraft bombed the barracks in the first use of naval aircraft in combat in Latin America. The defenders were driven from their positions. A group known subsequently as the Copacabana Fort revolt were led down Avenida Atlântica by Antônio de Siqueira Campos and Eduardo Gomes to confront the army loyalists; the eighteen made a last stand on the beach, where sixteen were killed and two, Gomes and Campos, survived. In the aftermath, the government imposed a state of emergency, 1,000 cadets were expelled from the army school and many officers were sent to remote garrisons.

== São Paulo Revolt of 1924 ==
The São Paulo Revolt of 1924 was the second tenentist revolt and the largest conflict in the city of São Paulo. It began in the early hours of July 5 and ended on 28 July 1924. The revolt was motivated by the discontent of the military with the economic crisis and the concentration of power at the hands of politicians from São Paulo and Minas Gerais. Commanded by retired General Isidoro Dias Lopes, with the participation of several lieutenants, the main objective of the uprising was to depose President Artur Bernardes (considered to be an enemy of the military since the crisis of the fake letters). Among the demands was the adoption of the secret ballot, free justice and the introduction of compulsory public education.

Raised in the capital of São Paulo on 5 July 1924 (the 2nd anniversary of the 18 Revolt of the Copacabana Fortress, the first tenentist revolt), the revolt occupied the city for 23 days, forcing the president of the state, Carlos de Campos, to flee to the neighborhood of Penha, in the east zone of São Paulo, on July 9, after the Campos Elíseos Palace, seat of the São Paulo government at that time, was bombarded. Carlos de Campos was installed in an adapted train car at the Guaiaúna station in Central Brazil, where the federal troops that came from Mogi das Cruzes were located. Rebellions broke out in several cities in the interior of the state of São Paulo, with many prefectures being taken over by the rebels.

The city of São Paulo was bombarded by Federal Government aircraft and artillery. The loyalist Army (loyal to President Artur Bernardes) used the so-called "terrifying bombardment", reaching various parts of the city, especially working-class neighborhoods such as Mooca and Brás, and the middle class, such as Perdizes. Without equivalent military equipment (artillery or aircraft) to confront government troops, the rebels retired to Bauru in the early hours of July 28, where Isidoro Dias Lopes heard news that the legalist army was concentrated in the city of Três Lagoas, Mato Grosso do Sul. At 10 o'clock on the morning of July 28, Carlos de Campos returned to his office in the Government Palace. Isidoro Dias Lopes and Juarez Távora then planned an attack on that city. The defeat at Três Lagoas, however, was the greatest defeat of this revolt. A third of the revolting troops died, were seriously injured or captured. Overthrown, the rioters then marched south, where, in the city of Foz do Iguaçu, in Paraná, they joined Gaucho officers led by Luís Carlos Prestes, in what became the greatest guerrilla feat in Brazil until then: the Prestes Column. The final balance indicates the death of 1,000 people, 4,000 injured and an estimated 300,000 temporarily driven into the outskirts of the city.

== July 1924 – February 1927: the long march of the Prestes Column ==
Two years later, on 5 July 1924, another group of army officers mounted a rebellion in São Paulo and Rio Grande do Sul. The date was chosen to honour the 1922 rebels; the uprising "was better prepared and was intended to bring down the Bernardes government". The formal leader was retired General Isidoro Dias Lopes, with others including Eduardo Gomes, Newton Estillac Leal, João Cabanas and Miguel Costa. The rebellion began well, with control of São Paulo being secured after the governor and forces loyal to him abandoned the city early on 9 July. The rebels in the city were put under siege by government forces, and prevented from linking up with other uprisings which were breaking out in places such as Bela Vista, Mato Grosso, Aracaju, Sergipe and Manaus. The city was then subjected to a several-week artillery and aerial bombardment, of which civilians bore the brunt. On 26 July, army aircraft dropped leaflets over the city warning the remaining civilians to leave so that loyalist forces would have a free hand against the rebels.

Isidoro's various attempts at securing an agreement with the government that would at least give the rebels amnesty were rebuffed. The leaders understood that they would be wiped out, along with a good part of the city, if they stayed. On the night of 27 July they staged a careful withdrawal of 3,000 troops on thirteen trains, via the Northwest Railroad, toward Mato Grosso, where they hoped to link up with sympathetic units. This withdrawal was executed so smoothly that it went unnoticed by the government forces until the morning. However, with their route to Mato Grosso blocked, the rebels retired to an area bordering Argentina and Paraguay close to Foz do Iguaçu.

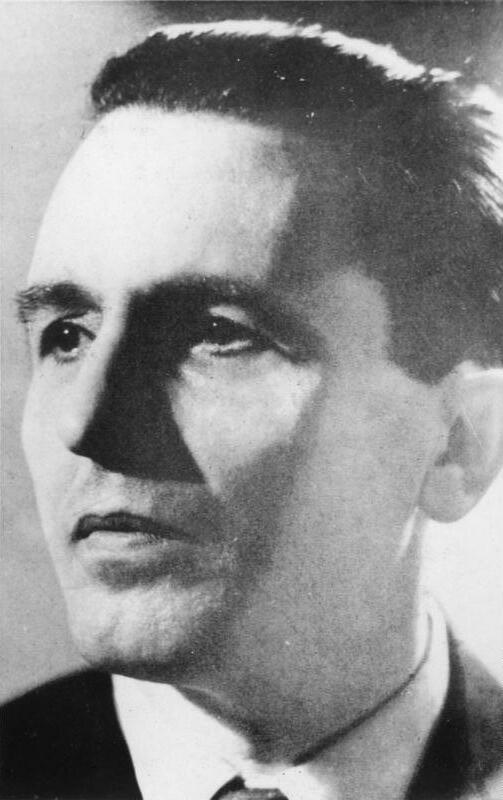
Luís Carlos Prestes

Having escaped to the interior and joined by others from Rio Grande do Sul, they began a campaign as a guerrilla force led by Luís Carlos Prestes and Miguel Costa. They became known as the Prestes Column, and covered some 25,000 kilometres from October 1924 to February 1927 as they roamed through the interior of the country seeking unsuccessfully to promote mass rebellion or at any rate to act as a moral gadfly to the nation's conscience. After losing significant numbers to desertion and sickness, escaping encirclement at Palmeira, Rio Grande do Sul, in January 1925, making a successful stand at the Iguazu Falls in February and after some initial disagreements about strategy, the rebels adopted one that amounted less to a war of movement than a moving "armed protest demonstration" that would serve as a constant call to action against the hated president Bernardes. The idea was not to defeat the forces sent against them, much less so the old objective of seizing power in Rio de Janeiro: the objective now was to stay alive, keep the column moving and seemingly invincible. In that, they succeeded as they moved through state after state from Mato Grosso to Maranhão and back, before seeking refuge in Bolivia in 1927".

Regarding the "Long March", Prestes subsequently wrote that "the tactics of swift marches, evasion as far as possible of contact with superior enemy forces and surprise attacks aimed at demoralizing the enemy and capturing arms and ammunition, demonstrated that in Brazilian conditions it was possible to stage a protracted struggle".
However, years later he was critical of the futility of his own strategy, writing that "I also defended the column's march tactics, claiming that they presented opportunities for recruiting new fighters. This, however, was not the case. The farmers sympathised with us for the simple reason that we were against the oppressors, they admired our heroism and devotion, but had no intention (with rare exceptions of some young people) of committing themselves to a struggle in whose success they could not believe".

== Legacy ==
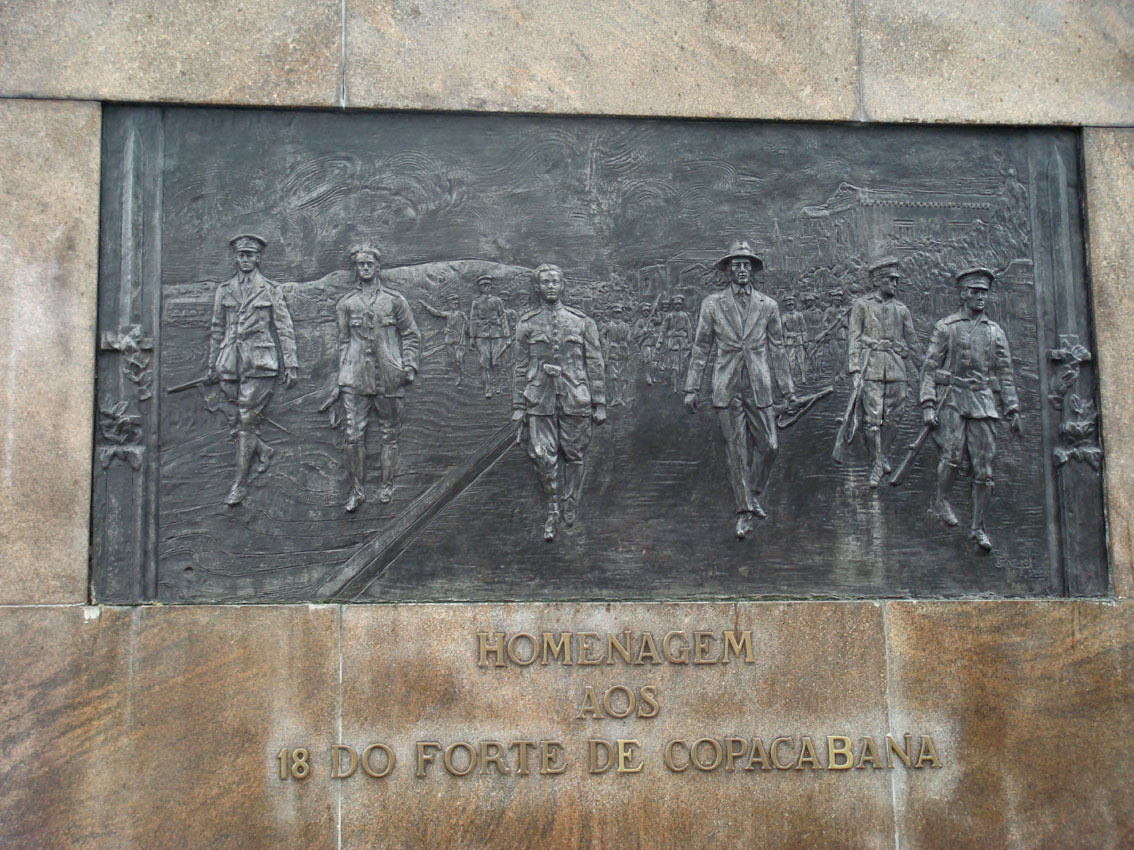
Plaque commemorating the '18 of the Copacabana Fort revolt'

The tenente revolts heralded the end of the café com leite politics and coronelismo and the beginning of social reforms. The actions and ideas that grew out of the revolts inspired other individuals, such as Getúlio Vargas, to lead the 1930 revolution against the Brazilian Government and bring down the First Brazilian Republic. The impact of the Prestes Column placed insurgents in contact with the rural peasantry of Brazil and the surrounding countryside; a contact that made the soldiers aware, for the first time, of the wretched conditions of their own countrymen. "The tenentes became the most visible proponents for revolution and helped convince Vargas that the use of force would be necessary". Subsequently, with the help of the tenentes, whom he restored to the army, often with significant promotions, Vargas "forged a highly personalised dictatorship". Prestes, however, "proclaimed his opposition to the 1930 coup and formally applied for membership of the Communist Party".

== See also ==
- Brazilian Army
- First Brazilian Republic
- Military history of Brazil
- Rebellions and revolutions in Brazil
