= Elza Fernandes =

Brazilian communist militant murdered on the orders of Luís Carlos Prestes (1921–1936)

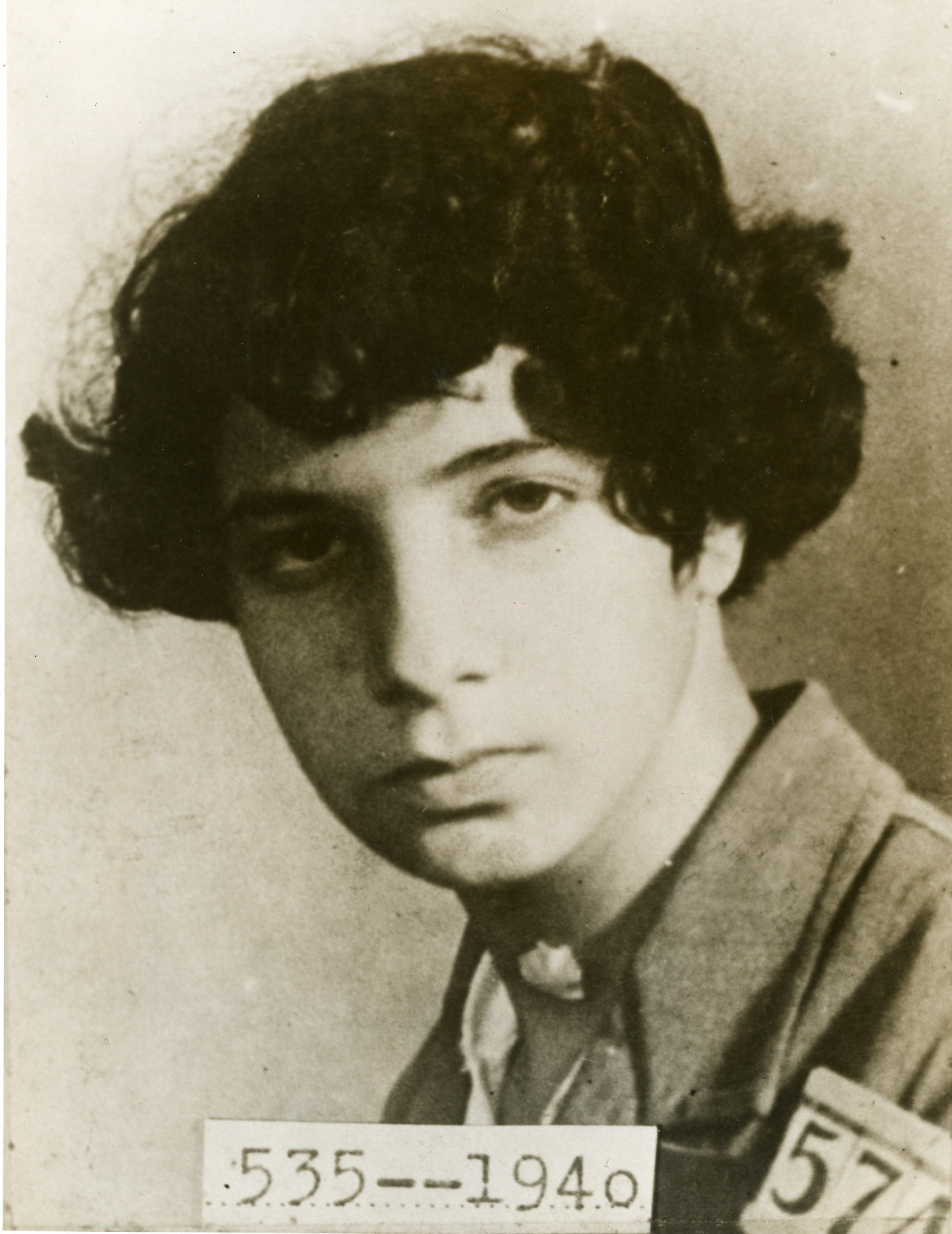
- Elza Fernandes in January 1936. This is the only known photo of her alive.
- Born: Elvira Cupello Calônio; 1 October 1921; Rio de Janeiro, Federal District
- Died: 2 March 1936 (aged 14); Rio de Janeiro, Federal District
- Cause of death: Homicide by strangulation
- Body discovered: 1940
- Partner: Antônio Maciel Bonfim

Elza Fernandes (1 October 1921 – 2 March 1936), whose real name was Elvira Cupello Calônio, was a political activist affiliated with the Brazilian Communist Party.

== Death ==
Exhumation of Elza Fernandes, in which part of her mortal remains can be seen. On the left, in a black suit, her brother Luiz Cupello Calônio

She was killed by strangulation in 1936 on suspicion of being a traitor to the communist movement. The order to execute her was given by the leader Luís Carlos Prestes. In 1940, Prestes and others were convicted and sentenced to 30 years in prison for the murder of Elza. However, in 1945, he was granted amnesty by Getúlio Vargas, who was seeking his support in the 1950 Brazilian presidential election.

Sérgio Rodrigues, a Brazilian writer, has claimed that the Brazilian left deliberately erased the memory of Elza Fernandes because her death was seen as shameful. When searching through public archives, it was always noticed that the folders related to Elza were empty. Rodrigues wrote a book about her in 2008.

== See also ==
- Antônio Maciel Bonfim
- Brazilian communist uprising of 1935
- Honório de Freitas Guimarães

== Bibliography ==
- Rodrigues, Sérgio (2018). Elza, a garota: a história da jovem comunista que o Partido matou (in Portuguese) (2nd ed.). São Paulo: Companhia das Letras. ISBN 9788535931037. (in English: Elza: The Girl. Translated by Zoe Perry. AmazonCrossing, Seattle 2014, ISBN 978-1-4778-1978-4.)
