= Eduardo Gomes =

Brazilian politician and military figure

- Gomes in 1950

Minister of Aeronautics
- In office January 11, 1965 – March 15, 1967
- President: Castelo Branco
- Preceded by: Márcio Melo
- Succeeded by: Márcio Melo
- In office August 24, 1954 – November 11, 1955
- President: Café Filho; Carlos Luz
- Preceded by: Epaminondas Santos
- Succeeded by: Vasco Alves Seco

Personal details
- Born: September 20, 1896 Petrópolis, Rio de Janeiro, Brazil
- Died: June 13, 1981 (aged 84) Rio de Janeiro, Rio de Janeiro, Brazil
- Party: UDN (1945–1965)

Military service
- Allegiance: Brazil
- Branch/service: Brazilian Air Force; Brazilian Army
- Years of service: 1918–1960
- Rank: Marshal of the Air
- Commands: See list: Mixed Aviation Group; 1st Aviation Regiment; Route and Air Base Service; 1st Air Zone; 2nd Air Zone
- Battles/wars: Copacabana Fort revolt; Constitutionalist Revolution; Brazilian communist uprising; World War II; 1964 Brazilian coup d'état

Eduardo Gomes (20 September 1896 – 13 June 1981) was a Brazilian aviator, military officer, and politician from Petrópolis.

== Biography ==
Gomes joined the Brazilian Army when he started his course at the Military School of Realengo. He finished this course in 1918 and, in December of the same year, he was transferred to Curitiba. In 1921 he started his course at the Military Aviation School in Rio de Janeiro. In the same year, the presidential campaign divided the oligarchies. Some military officers planned a coup to stop the candidate of the party in power, Artur Bernardes, if he was elected. However, the imprisonment of former president Hermes da Fonseca and the closing of the Military Club precipitated the start of a rebellion on 5 July 1922. The rebels gave up quickly and only 28 resisted inside the Fort Copacabana. Gomes proposed that the rebels leave the fortress and face the government troops. They left, armed, and the diehard rebel group is still known as the 18 of the Fort Copacabana.

Gomes was arrested but in 1923 he left prison. At the end of 1924, Gomes tried to join another rebellion in the south of Brazil led by Luís Carlos Prestes. He was arrested in Santa Catarina and transferred to Rio de Janeiro. He was transferred from one prison to another, until he was sent to Trindade Island.

When Washington Luís became President of Brazil in 1926, all the prisoners from Trindade Island were released. The next June, Gomes was nearly arrested again, but he escaped to Campos, in Rio de Janeiro. Two years later, he handed himself in to the authorities and was imprisoned for two years.

In 1930, Gomes was freed, and once again was involved in revolutionary activities—this time with the intent of preventing president-elect Júlio Prestes from taking office. With the victory of the rebels, the ouster of president Washington Luís, and his replacement by Getúlio Vargas, he remained in high military command and notably led the 1st Aviation Division against a communist uprising in 1935. However, he resigned his military command following the establishment of the Estado Novo and became an opponent of Vargas.

Gomes was in the group that created the Military Air Post (Correio Aéreo Militar, CAM) in 1931. In December 1945 Gomes was the candidate of the anti-Vargas conservative UDN for President of Brazil, but he lost the election to Eurico Gaspar Dutra. In October 1950 he ran again and lost to Getúlio Vargas.

In 1954 he was the Minister of Aeronautics in the brief administration of João Café Filho that followed the suicide of President Vargas. He was in favor of the military takeover in 1964 that overthrew João Goulart, a vice-president who had taken office in 1961 upon the resignation of Jânio Quadros. In February 1965, still as Minister of Aeronautics, Gomes signed a controversial decree that shut down Panair do Brasil, the country's flag carrier airline. He remained as Minister of Aeronautics until the end of the government of Humberto de Alencar Castelo Branco, when he left public life (1967). Eduardo Gomes died on June 13, 1981.

Eduardo Gomes International Airport, in Manaus, Amazonas, is named after him.
