= Luís Carlos Prestes, Sergipe =

Luís Carlos Prestes
- Village
- Location of Carira in Sergipe

- Location within Brazil
- Coordinates: 10°29′40″S 37°45′21″W
- Country: Brazil
- State: Sergipe
- Municipality: Carira
- Elevation: 222 m (728 ft)

Luís Carlos Prestes or Assentamento Luís Carlos Prestes (Brazilian Portuguese pronunciation: [luˈjz ˈkaɦlʊz ˈpɾɛʃti]) is a village in the municipality of Carira, state of Sergipe, in northeastern Brazil. It is named after the Brazilian politician and revolutionary Luís Carlos Prestes.

== See also ==
- List of villages in Sergipe
