= Maria Prestes =

Brazilian communist activist (1930–2022)

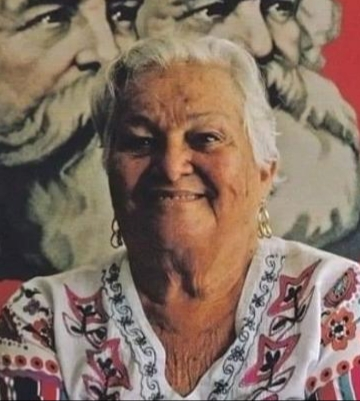
- Born: Altamira Rodrigues Sobral; 2 February 1930; Recife, Pernambuco, Brazil
- Died: 4 February 2022 (aged 92); Rio de Janeiro, Brazil
- Occupation: Brazilian Communist Party activist
- Partner: Luís Carlos Prestes (1950–1990)
- Children: 9

Altamira Rodrigues Sobral Prestes (2 February 1930 – 4 February 2022), known by the pseudonym Maria Prestes, was an activist with the Brazilian Communist Party and the partner of the party's longtime leader Luís Carlos Prestes.

== Biography ==
Prestes was born Altamira Rodrigues Sobral in Recife, Brazil, in 1930. She grew up working in the fields; her parents João Rodrigues Sobral (known as "Camarada Lima") and Mariana Ribas Pontes Rodrigues Sobral were peasants and Brazilian Communist Party activists. Her father was imprisoned for a large portion of her childhood. Her first marriage, at a very young age, fell apart quickly, leaving her with two children, Pedro and Paulo.

Like her parents, she was involved in communist activism in Brazil, and she also joined the women's rights movement. She used the name Maria do Carmo Ribeiro in an effort to avoid police persecution.

Around 1950, she began a lifelong partnership with Luís Carlos Prestes, the Communist Party's longtime general secretary, a widower. The two had met when Maria was appointed as his security guard. They had seven children together: Antônio João Rodrigues Sobral Prestes, Rosa Rodrigues Sobral Prestes, Ermelinda Rodrigues Sobral Prestes, Luís Carlos Rodrigues Sobral Prestes Filho, Mariana Rodrigues Sobral Prestes, Zóia Rodrigues Sobral Prestes, and Yuri Rodrigues Sobral Prestes. Luís also raised her sons Pedro and Paulo as his own. Their relationship lasted until his death in 1990, although they never legally married.

In 2012, Prestes wrote Meu companheiro, a memoir of her partnership with the Communist Party leader. She also published a collection of essays about her time living in exile with her family in Moscow during the 1970s, titled O sabor clandestino de Maria Prestes.

Prestes was given the Diploma Bertha Lutz, a women's rights honor issued by the Federal Senate, in 2012. She lived among her children, grandchildren, and great-grandchildren in Rio de Janeiro until her death on 4 February 2022, of COVID-19, at age 92. Brazilian women's rights activist Edna Calheiros called her death a "great loss of a compatriot, a comrade, a fighter."
