= Antônio Maciel Bonfim =

Brazilian communist (1905–1947)

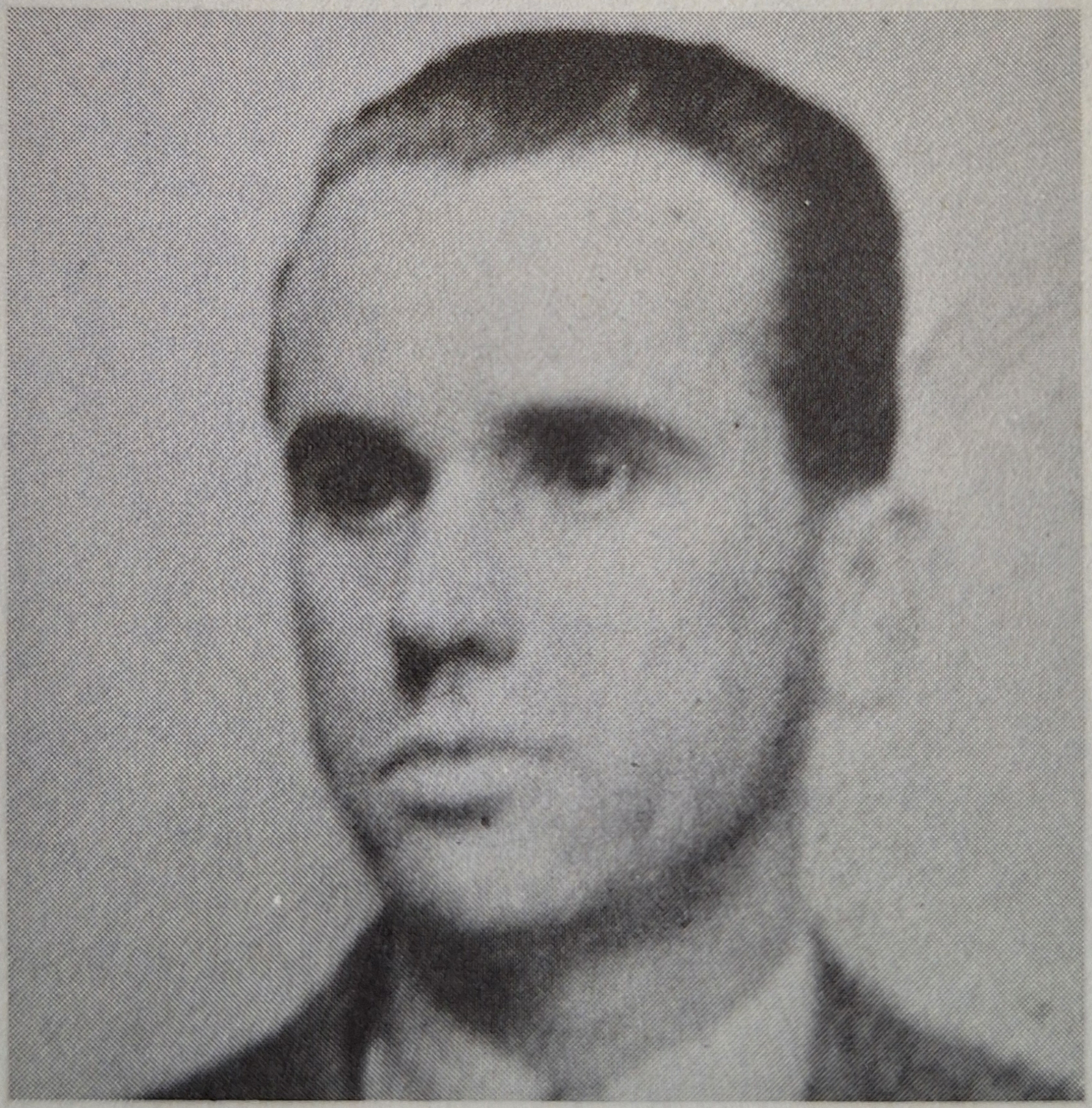
Bonfim

Antônio Maciel Bonfim (10 February 1905 – 2 April 1947), also known by the code name Miranda, was a revolutionary militant and the general secretary of the Communist Party of Brazil (PCB) between the years 1934 and 1936.

== Early life ==
Bonfim was born on 10 February 1905 in Irará, Bahia, being the son of peasants João Matos de Bonfim and Maria Maciel Bonfim. He attended a religious school in his hometown and later became a teacher hired by the Anglo-Mexican Petroleum Company. Bonfim taught secondary courses in Alagoinhas, Bahia, where he also worked as an editor for the Correio de Alagoinhas. By September 1929, he was an assistant at the Wilson, Sons & Company Ltd. firm.

== Communist activities ==
In September 1930, Bonfim was the secretary of the Workers' Center and was arrested in Alagoinhas, accused of subversive propaganda and establishing clandestine cells in Salvador, Bahia. Considered at the time as the leader of communism in Bahia, he belonged to the Revolutionary Action League created by Luís Carlos Prestes. Bonfim was sentenced to deportation to Uruguay; he managed to escape in Paraná and attempted to join the PCB, but his request was denied. He was arrested again, still in Paraná, and sent to Ilha Grande, where there were already several communists imprisoned, suspicious that Bonfim might be a police agent. Still without having joined the party, he managed to escape with other members in November 1932 and headed to Rio de Janeiro.

In the first months of 1933, Bonfim participated in a course taught by the Communist International in Brazil, achieving excellent performance, alongside Lauro Reginaldo Rocha. Finally accepted by the party, he quickly rose to the position of general secretary in July 1934. In 1933 or 1934, Bonfim allegedly sent an emissary to recruit Golbery do Couto e Silva into the party, who was then a young infantry lieutenant. Within the PCB, he became famous as Miranda, but adopted several other codenames: Adalberto de Andrade Fernandes, Américo de Carvalho, Américo, Queiroz, and Tavares.

Delegated to the Third Conference of Communist Parties of South America and the Caribbean, held in Moscow, Bonfim spoke about the Brazilian political situation and impressed the top leader of the Communist International, Dmitry Manuilsky.

== Arrest ==
Following the defeat of the Communist Uprising, he was arrested on 12 January 1936, along with his 14-year-old partner Elvira Cupello Calônio. Bonfim was tortured and received the news of her execution in prison, which was ordered by Luís Carlos Prestes and the party leadership. After that, he began to collaborate with the police and was sentenced to four years and four months in prison in 1937. He was imprisoned in Fernando de Noronha and on Ilha Grande.

== Later life and death ==
Bonfim was released on 19 July 1940, suffering from tuberculosis, without a kidney, and in poverty. He died on 2 April 1947 in Rio de Janeiro.

== Legacy ==
His alleged collaboration with the police was harshly criticized by Graciliano Ramos, Agildo Barata, Leôncio Basbaum, and Gregório Bezerra. According to some authors such as Leôncio Basbaum, Edgar Carone, and John W. F. Dulles, Bonfim may have been a police agent infiltrated into the PCB, although this has never been confirmed.
