= Olga Benário Prestes =

German Brazilian Communist militant (1908-1942)

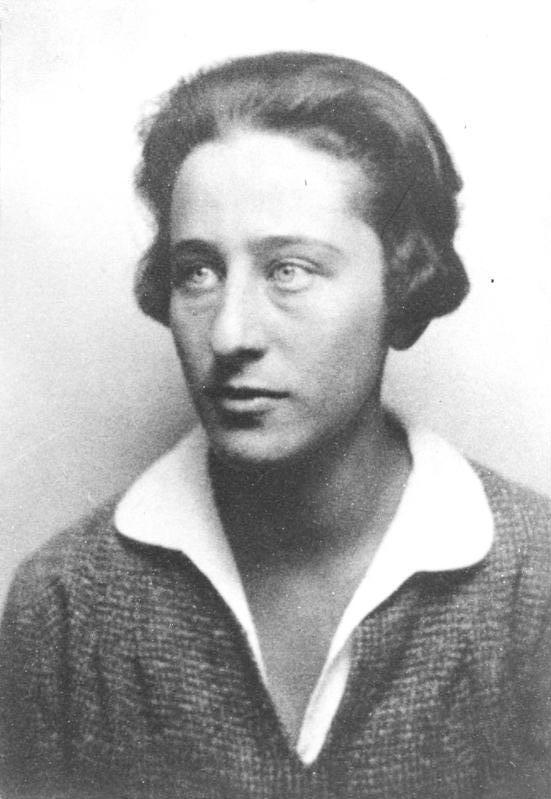
- Olga Benário in 1928
- Born: Olga Gutmann Benário; 12 February 1908; Munich, Kingdom of Bavaria, German Empire
- Died: 23 April 1942 (aged 34); Bernburg killing centre, Saxony-Anhalt, Nazi Germany
- Political party: Communist Party of Germany; Brazilian Communist Party
- Spouse(s): Otto Braun (m. 1926; div. 1931) Luís Carlos Prestes (m. 1934)
- Children: Anita Leocádia Prestes

Olga Benário Prestes (Brazilian Portuguese pronunciation: [ˈɔwgɐ beˈnaɾju ˈpɾɛstʃis], 12 February 1908 – 7 April 1942) was a German-Brazilian communist militant executed by Nazi Germany at the Bernburg killing centre.

== Biography ==
Olga Gutmann Benário was born in Munich to a Jewish family. Her father, Leo Benário, was a Social Democrat lawyer, and her mother, Eugenie (Gutmann), was a member of Bavarian high-society. In 1923, aged fifteen, she joined the Communist Youth International and her activities with the group (including putting up posters) led local police to register her as a "communist agitator". At the age of 18 she moved with her lover and fellow party member Otto Braun to Berlin where she continued her activities in the working class district of Neukoln. In this period she was arrested on charges of 'preparations for high-treason' and in 1928 she helped Braun's escape from Moabit prison. Despite German authorities offering rewards of 10,000 marks for her arrest, "Many workers gave her a home and doors were made in different places so she could escape at anytime". She went to Czechoslovakia and from there, reunited with Braun, to Moscow, where Benário attended the Lenin-School of the Comintern and then worked as an instructor of the Communist Youth International, in the Soviet Union and in France and Great Britain, where she participated in coordinating anti-fascist activities. She parted from Otto Braun in 1931.

After her stay in Britain, where she was briefly arrested, Olga attended a course in the Zhukovsky Military Academy, leading some historians to view her as an agent of Soviet military intelligence. Due to her military training, in 1934 she was given the task of helping the return to Brazil of Luís Carlos Prestes, to whom she was assigned as a bodyguard. In order to accomplish this mission, false papers were created stating that they were a Portuguese married couple. By the time they arrived at Rio de Janeiro in 1935, this cover had become a reality, as the couple had fallen in love. After a failed insurrection in November 1935, Benário and her husband went into hiding, and after barely escaping a police raid in Ipanema, they were both eventually arrested in January 1936, during the harsh anti-communist campaign declared after Getúlio Vargas had proclaimed martial law and was already plotting the 1937 coup that eventually led to the institution of the fascist-like Estado Novo regime.

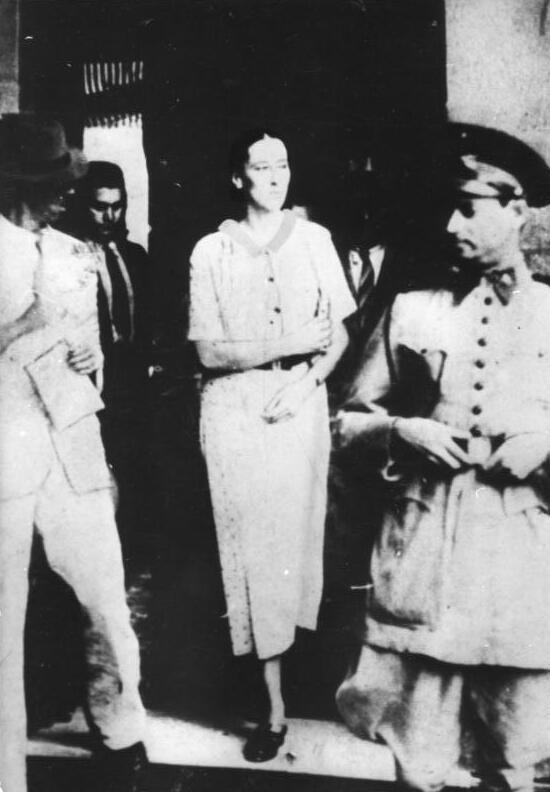
Olga Benário Prestes during her imprisonment in Brazil in 1936. She was shortly afterwards deported to Nazi Germany and executed at the Bernburg killing centre.

Pregnant and separated from Prestes, Benário clung to her alias, only to have her real identity disclosed by Brazilian diplomats, working hand-in-hand with the Gestapo. Her lawyers attempted to avoid extradition by means of a habeas corpus at the Brazilian Supreme Federal Court based on her pregnancy, because extradition would have left a newborn Brazilian national in the power of a foreign government. As Brazilian law forbids the extradition of nationals, Olga's lawyers expected to win time until Olga gave birth on Brazilian soil to an ipso facto Brazilian citizen - irrespective of the child's paternity, which remained legally doubtful in the absence of evidence for Olga's and Prestes' marriage - something that would have rendered extradition quite unlikely. The plea, however, was speedily quashed, the rapporteur-justice alleging that habeas corpus was superseded by martial law and that Olga's deportation was justified as "an alien noxious to public order".

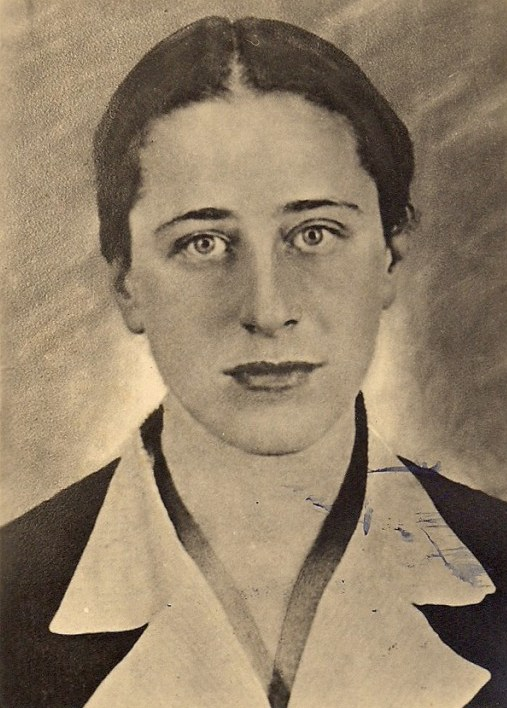
Olga Benário Prestes

After the Brazilian supreme court's decision, and despite an international campaign, Olga was forcibly returned to Germany in September 1936. The captain of the German liner that took her cancelled scheduled stops in non-German European ports, foiling communist attempts at rescuing her. On arrival, she was put in Barnimstrasse women's prison in Berlin, where on 27 November she gave birth to a daughter, Anita Leocádia. At the age of fourteen months, the child was released into the care of her paternal grandmother, Leocádia Prestes.

Her arrest in Brazil and eventual extradition to Nazi Germany, where she would die in Ravensbrück concentration camp, was also made by possible by the collaboration of Britain's MI6 with the Brazilian authorities.

After the birth of her child, Olga was sent to Lichtenburg concentration camp in 1938, transferred to Ravensbrück concentration camp in 1939, and finally to the Bernburg killing centre in 1942, where she was gassed alongside hundreds of other female political prisoners.

== Aftermath ==
As Vargas joined the United Nations and Brazil entered World War II against the Axis, Luís Carlos Prestes, Benário's former partner and Anita Leocádia's father, struck a political partnership with him in order to avoid Vargas' immediate ousting in 1945, which was demanded both by his more rightist domestic opponents and by Adolf Berle as US ambassador. This move was in line with Popular Front Communist policies of the time: Prestes argued that, by declaring himself against Vargas' immediate resignation, he wanted to avoid a "redemptory coup" as well as to take a stand against "the decrepit remains of reaction".

== Legacy ==
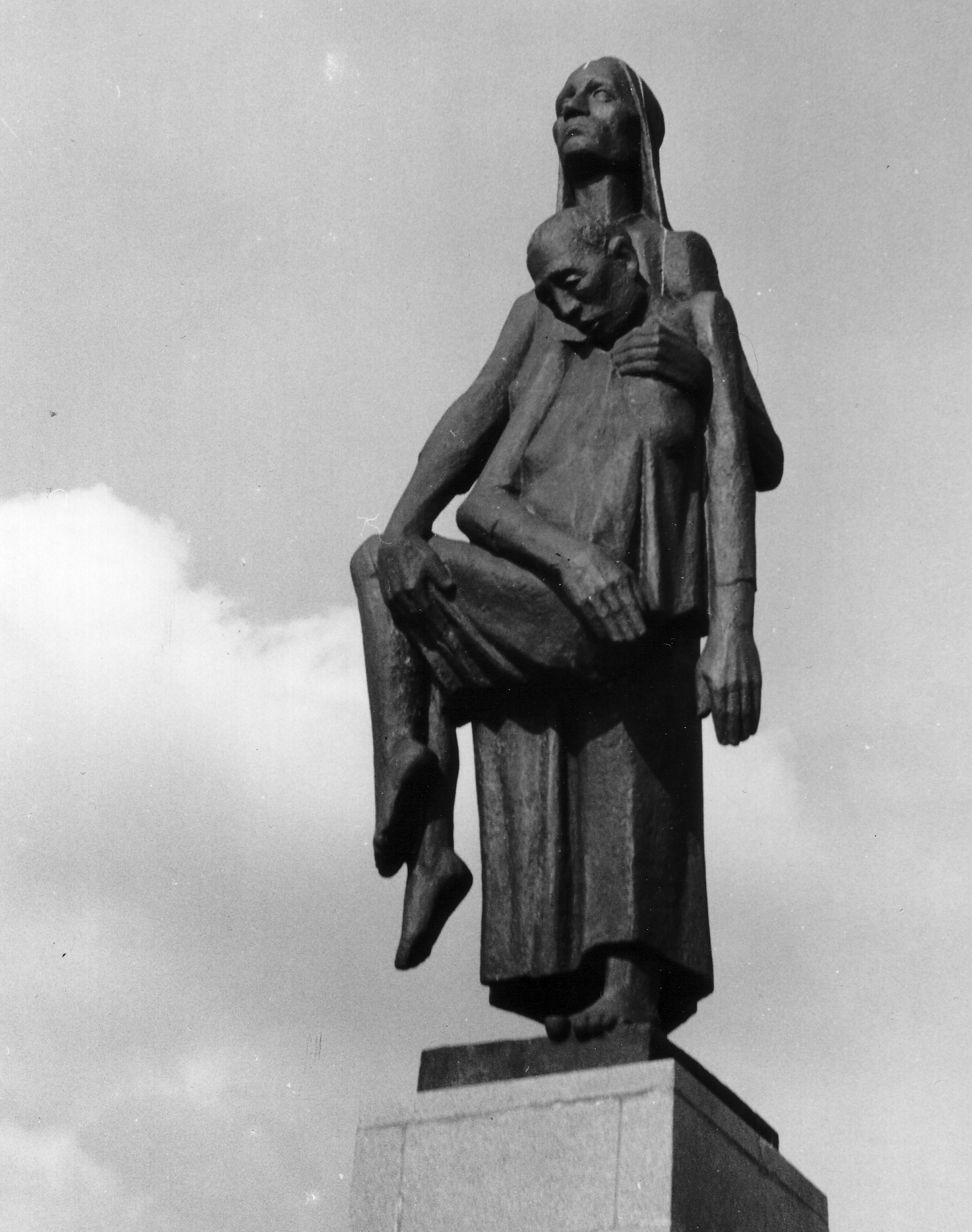
"Die Tragende" ("The bearer") by Will Lammert, memorial created after Benário Prestes at Ravensbrück KZ

In the postwar German Democratic Republic, Benário was presented as the model of the female revolutionary, and the writer Anna Seghers wrote a biographical sketch about her for International Women's Day in 1951.

Along with Yevgenia Klemm, Antonina Nikiforova, Mela Ernst, Rosa Jochmann, Katja Niederkirchner, Rosa Thälmann, Olga Körner, Martha Desrumaux, Minna Villain and Maria Grollmuß, Benário was one of the prominent prisoners in the Ravensbrück concentration camp who were publicly commemorated during the liberation celebrations at the Ravensbrück National Memorial of the GDR.

Benário was the subject of an opera Entre la Piel y el Alma by G. P. Cribari, which premiered in Glasgow at the Royal Scottish Academy of Music and Drama on 22 May 1992.

In East Germany, Ruth Werner published a biographical novel for young readers about Benario in 1961.

In 2004, a Brazilian film based on Benário's life, Olga, directed by telenovela director Jayme Monjardim, portrayed a depoliticized account of Benário's life, centered on her love affair with Prestes. German critics called it "kitsch advertising". Also in 2004 she was the subject of a German documentary (with reconstructed scenes) directed by the former assistant to Rainer Werner Fassbinder, Galip Iyitanir, Olga Benário - Ein Leben für die Revolution.

In 2009, Benario was one of three female protagonists in Swiss writer Robert Cohen's novel about the anti-fascist exile Exil der frechen Frauen.

In January 2013, the English translation of the play Olga's Room by German playwright Dea Loher, was presented by the Speaking in Tongues Theatre Company at the Arcola Theatre in London.

In 2013, Robert Cohen edited the exchange of letters from prisons and concentration camps between Benario and Luiz Carlos Prestes. In 2016, he published an edited version of the recently accessible large dossier of documents of the Gestapo on Benario. In 2019 he published an extensive research paper on Benario's life: "The Perpetrators and their Victim. A Report on the Gestapo Dossier on Olga Benario."
