= Anita Leocádia Prestes =

Brazilian/German historian (born 1936)

Anita Prestes
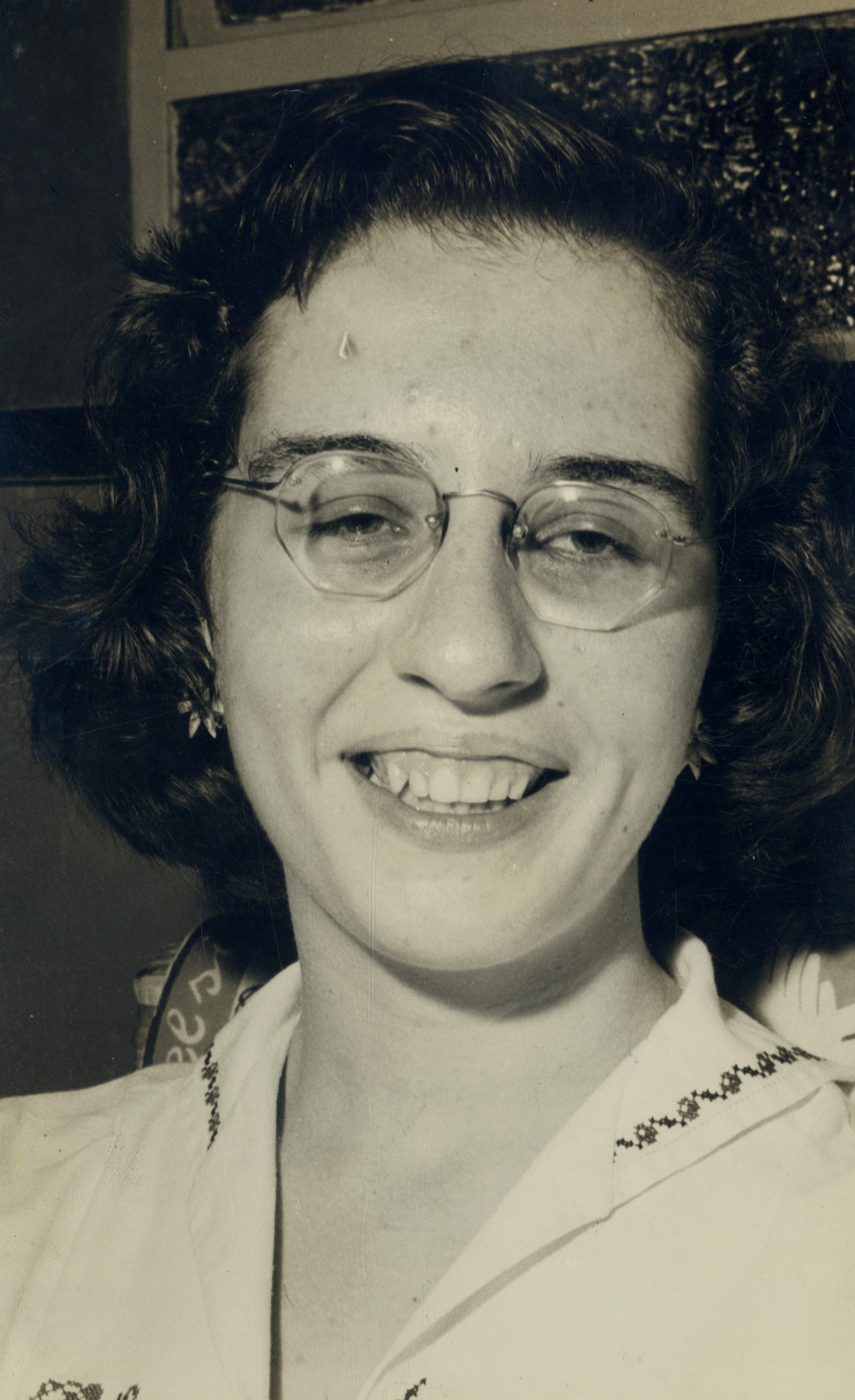
- Anita in 1957
- Born: Anita Leocádia Benário Prestes; 27 November 1936 (age 89); Berlin, Nazi Germany
- Education: University of Brazil (BS); Moscow Social Sciences Institute (M.Ec, M.Phil); Fluminense Federal University (Sc.D)
- Parents: Luís Carlos Prestes (father); Olga Benário Prestes (mother)
- Scientific career
- Awards: Casa de las Américas Prize (Cuba)
- Fields: History
- Institutions: Federal University of Rio de Janeiro (UFRJ)
- Thesis: A Coluna Prestes (1990)
- Academic advisors: Maria Yedda Linhares

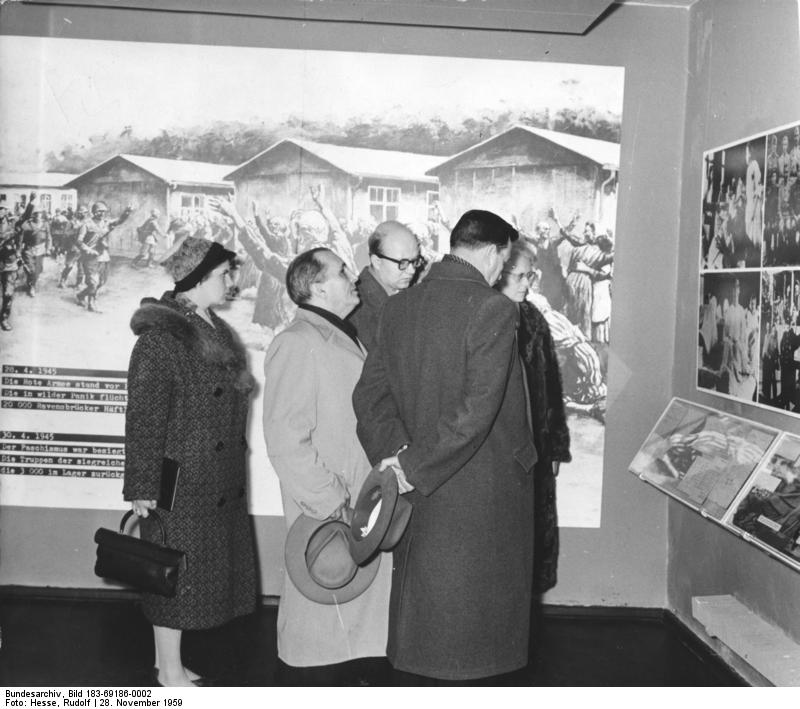
Anita Leocádia Prestes

Anita Leocádia Benário Prestes (born 27 November 1936) is a German-Brazilian historian. She is the daughter of political activists Olga Benário Prestes and Luís Carlos Prestes.

She was born in Barnimstrasse women's prison in Berlin and was handed over to the care of her paternal grandmother, Brazilian Leocádia Prestes, at age 14 months. Her mother Olga was sent to Ravensbrück concentration camp and from there to a former psychiatric hospital in Bernburg in 1942, where she was gassed.

In 1964, Prestes achieved a degree in Chemistry from the then "University of Brazil", now known as the Universidade Federal do Rio de Janeiro (UFRJ). Two years later she gained a Masters in Organic Chemistry.

== Life in the USSR ==
At the beginning of the 1970s, Prestes moved into exile in the USSR. In August 1972, she was indicted in Brazil for political activities, with the Conselho Permanente de Justiça para o Exército (the Army supreme court) sentencing her in absentia to 4 years and 6 months in prison.

In December 1975 Prestes earned a Doctorate in Political Economics from the Institute of Social Science in Moscow and four years later in September 1979, the Brazilian courts reduced Prestes's sentence by four years as part of a wider amnesty.

== Return to Brazil ==
In 1989 Prestes received a Doctorate in History from the Fluminense Federal University, Rio de Janeiro, with a thesis named A Coluna Prestes (The Prestes Column), which was the movement commanded by her father of almost 1500 men fighting against the presidency of Artur Bernardes. She is now a retired associate professor of Brazilian History, but she continues teaching on the Master's and Doctorate's Comparative History Program at the Universidade Federal do Rio de Janeiro (UFRJ).

== Books ==
- Prestes, Anita Leocádia (1994). Os militares e a reação republicana: as origens do tenentismo [The militaries and the republican reaction: the origins of tenentismo]. Vozes.
- Prestes, Anita Leocádio (1995). Uma epopéia brasileira: a Coluna Prestes [A Brazilian epic: the Prestes Column]. Editora Moderna.
- Prestes, Anita Leocádio (1999). Tenentismo pós-30: continuidade o ruptura? [Tenentismo post-1930: continuity or rupture?]. Paz e Terra.
- Prestes, Anita Leocádio (2001). Da inssureição armada, 1935 à união nacional, 1938-1945: a virada tática na política do PCB [From the armed insurgence, 1935 to the national union, 1938-1945: the tactical turnaround in PCB's politics]. Paz e Terra.
- Prestes, Anita Leocádio (2006). Luiz Carlos Prestes: patriota, revolucionário, comunista [Luiz Carlos Prestes: patriot, revolutionary, communist] (PDF). Editora Expressão Popular.
- Prestes, Anita Leocádio (2008). Luiz Carlos Prestes e a Aliança Nacional Libertadora: os caminhos da luta antifascista no Brasil, 1934/35 [Luiz Carlos Prestes and the Liberating National Alliance: the paths of the anti-fascist fight in Brazil, 1934/35]. Editora Brasiliense.
- Prestes, Anita Leocádio; Prestes, Luiz Carlos; Prestes, Lygia (2001). Anos tormentosos [Stormy Years]. Arquivo Público do Estado do Rio de Janeiro.
- Prestes, Anita Leocádio (2010). Os comunistas brasileiros (1945-1956/58): Luiz Carlos Prestes e a política do PCB [The Brazilian Communists (1945-1956/58): Luiz Carlos Prestes and the PCB's politics]. Editora Brasiliense.
- Prestes, Anita Leocádio (1997). A Coluna Prestes [The Prestes Column]. Paz e Terra.
- Prestes, Anita Leocádio (2017). Luiz Carlos Prestes: um comunista brasileiro [Luiz Carlos Prestes: a Brazilian Communist]. Boitempo Editorial.
