= Brazilian communist uprising =

Military revolt in 1935

- Part of the interwar period
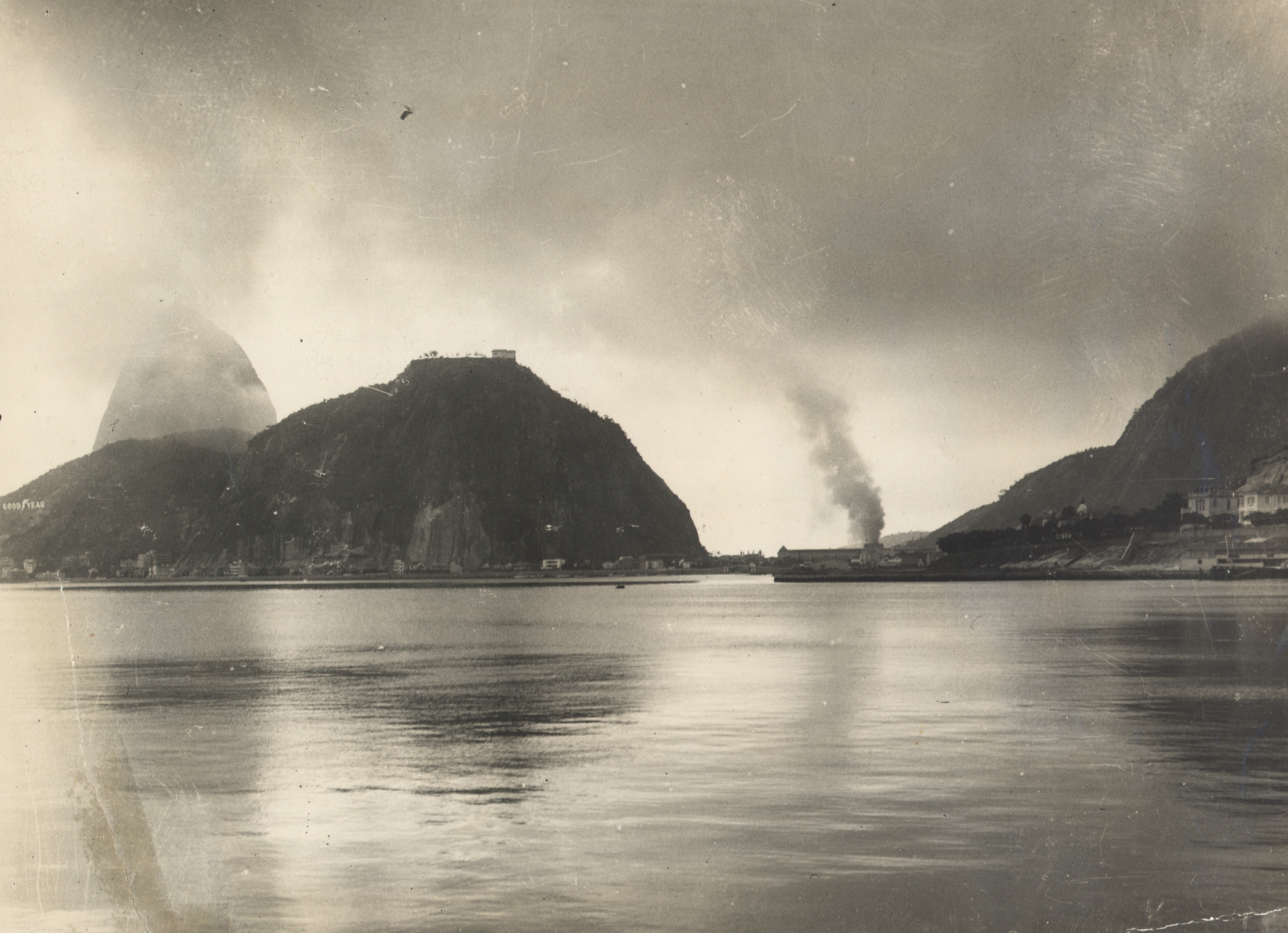
- The 3rd Infantry Regiment barracks in Rio de Janeiro on fire after the communist insurrection
Date	23–27 November 1935 (4 days)
Location	Natal, Recife, and Rio de Janeiro, Brazil
Result	Brazilian government victory

Belligerents
Brazil; Military Police; Brazilian Army; Brazilian Navy; Marine Corps	National Liberation Alliance: Brazilian Communist Party; Supported by: Comintern

Commanders and leaders
Getúlio Vargas	Luís Carlos Prestes

Casualties and losses
30+ killed	120+ killed

The Brazilian communist uprising (Portuguese: Intentona Comunista) was a military revolt in Brazil led by Luís Carlos Prestes and leftist low-rank military against Getúlio Vargas's government on behalf of the National Liberation Alliance (Aliança Nacional Libertadora - ANL). It took place in the cities of Natal, Recife, and the capital Rio de Janeiro between 23 and 27 November 1935. The uprising was supported by the Brazilian Communist Party (PCB), then called the Communist Party of Brazil, and the Communist International.

== Background ==
In July 1934, with the approval of Brazil's new constitution and the election of Vargas, the country entered a period of constitutional normality, although no one was satisfied. President Getúlio Vargas declared himself against the constitutional regime despite his authoritative role. Other opposing factions within Brazil's politics shared his point of view that the new government was weak and thus began to plot its overthrow.

The plot to overthrow the government was begun in 1934 by disgraced military officers who lost power and prestige as a result of collaborating with former Brazilian president Artur Bernardes during the Revolution of 1930. Using their position within the military, conspirators began an effort to siphon military weapons from police forces and recruited military men of sergeant rank and below to form a combat force.

These efforts gave the revolutionaries connections to most garrisons in the country by October 1934, although three factions would form within the revolutionary movement, causing a clash of ideas. The first group, based in São Paulo, was led by military officers and civilians seeking social reform. The second faction was made up of military personnel who shared authoritarian ideals, while the third was composed of communists within the military, both enlisted and officers.

The movement during this time would find itself infiltrated by the Communist International (Comintern), MI6 agent Johann Heinrich Amadeus de Graaf, and Vargas' government. Filinto Muller, an officer loyal to Vargas based in the Federal District, learned of the conspiracy against the government as early as October 1934.

Senior military leaders were rightfully fearful that the communist element in their midst would take over their movement. The Brazilian Communist Party, which was then called the Communist Party of Brazil, began its efforts to take control of the movement by January 1935 after the planning for an uprising caught the attention of the Soviet Union. Communist agents identified these political divisions within the movement, particularly the differences between officers who rallied with Artur Bernardes and those who wished for social reform. The communists took full control of the movement by March 1935 after expelling unsympathetic officers from the cause. This would act to hinder the movement, which had initially intended to begin the uprising during Carnival week, in 1935.

During this time the National Liberation Alliance was created in Brazil, inspired by popular fronts that emerged in Europe to prevent Nazi-fascist political advance. The ANL would serve to expand the conspiracy by attracting many military personnel, Catholics, socialists, and liberals into the mass movement under a unified front alongside numerous unions.

Members of the ANL viewed Vargas as a revolutionary who would continue to further plunge the country towards an authoritarian regime. The movement's platform was the fight against the exploitation of Brazil by international capital, the struggle for land reform and the struggle for democracy: for Bread, Land, and Freedom.

Luís Carlos Prestes was publicly announced as the ANL's honorary president following the party's announcement of its formation, based on his involvement in leading the revolutions of the 1920s and his high esteem among military officials. A revolutionary forerunner of Che Guevara, "Cavalier of Hope" Prestes became a staunch communist in 1930, publicly acknowledging his allegiance to the plight of the proletariat in 1931 following a visit to Moscow. Prestes' requests for membership into Brazil's Communist Party were ignored for years, while away from Brazil, until a directive was issued by the Comintern, directly requesting his acceptance into the organization.

In April 1935, Prestes would be sent back to Brazil following a winter season in Moscow with his wife, fellow communist Olga Benario Prestes, along with communists Harry Berger, Argentine Rodolfo Ghioldi, León-Julles Vallée, Franz Paul Gruber, and American Victor Alan Baron, who would join the Comintern's delegation to Brazil. The delegation from the Comintern was accompanied by a GRU agent who saw to their security during and after the trip to Brazil.

Upon his return, thanks to his reputation among military officers, Prestes assumed control of the conspiracy and plans for the revolution to come. With Prestes heading the conspiracy, the Comintern felt confident in financially supporting the movement allowing the movement to grow exponentially, allowing the party to produce new propaganda and initiate new communist youth programs.

Thanks to information provided to Vargas by Filinto Muller, Vargas was able to connect the conspirators to the National Liberation Alliance. In response, Vargas successfully urged the National Congress of Brazil (Portuguese: Congresso Nacional do Brasil) to pass the 1935 National Security law outlawing the political alliance formed by the ANL. This legislation inhibited Prestes' ability to rally widespread support from the masses, who worried about becoming targeted by the government.

At the time, Vargas' government had acknowledged the threat of revolution posed by members of the ANL, reaching the same conclusion as the Comintern when it decided to back the conspiracy. In July, the government moved against the ANL, with troops raiding offices, confiscating propaganda, seizing records, and jailing leaders. This crackdown made Prestes change his tactics, forcing him to spread additional agents throughout the army to recruit new conspirators and bolster his forces while continuing to defy Vargas by having the ANL continue to host their illegal rallies throughout the summer of 1935. By August 1935, Prestes had completed drafting his plans for the installation of a communist regime by way of military uprising in several regions to trigger strikes and revolution.

== Outbreak of uprisings ==
The first military uprising broke out on 23 November 1935, in Natal where communists successfully created a provisional government just outside the city for some time. The next day, another military uprising took place in Recife. On the 27th, a revolt broke out in Rio de Janeiro, the capital of the country at that time.

From Rio de Janeiro, Luís Carlos Prestes the day before was still attempting to rally support from other high ranking military officials, including Newton Estillac Leal, who would ignore his plea and inform the government of these attempts at communication. Citizens in Natal and Recife were distributed military surplus to fight along with the insurgent revolutionaries against loyalist troops.

The most dramatic episode of the communist uprising was the attempt to conquer the Aviation Regiment in Campo dos Afonsos, at the time part of the army (the Brazilian Air Force would only be created in 1941), with the aim of obtaining aircraft to bomb the city of Rio de Janeiro. Loyalist military soldiers managed to install artillery pieces to shell the runway and prevent any bombers from taking off. The final assault was carried out with an infantry charge supported by artillery, which retook the captured installations.

Despite uprisings in three major urban centers, other populated centers such as São Paulo and Minas Gerais with organized communist elements failed to act, as the military intercepted orders destined to communist cells in both cities. The Brazilian military confined the insurgents to the Federal District, cutting off communications between the rebel cells, isolating the uprisings to their respective cities and preventing communist leaders from organizing cohesively.

Without the support of the working class, and restricted to the three cities, the rebellion was quickly and violently put down after several weeks of fighting. Rebels would eventually lay down their arms and were spared from execution by Vargas, who sought criminal trials only against the leaders of the movement and collaborators.

President Vargas accused the revolutionary conspirators of being against God, against the motherland, and against the concept of family, demonizing those who participated. From then on, intense persecution affected not only communists but also all government opponents. Thousands of people were arrested across the country for their direct or indirect involvement in the uprising. Congressmen, senators, and even the mayor of Rio de Janeiro, Pedro Ernesto Baptista, would be incarcerated. The regime arrested and tortured Prestes, while deporting his wife, Olga Benario, to Nazi Germany, where she later died in a concentration camp.

== Aftermath ==
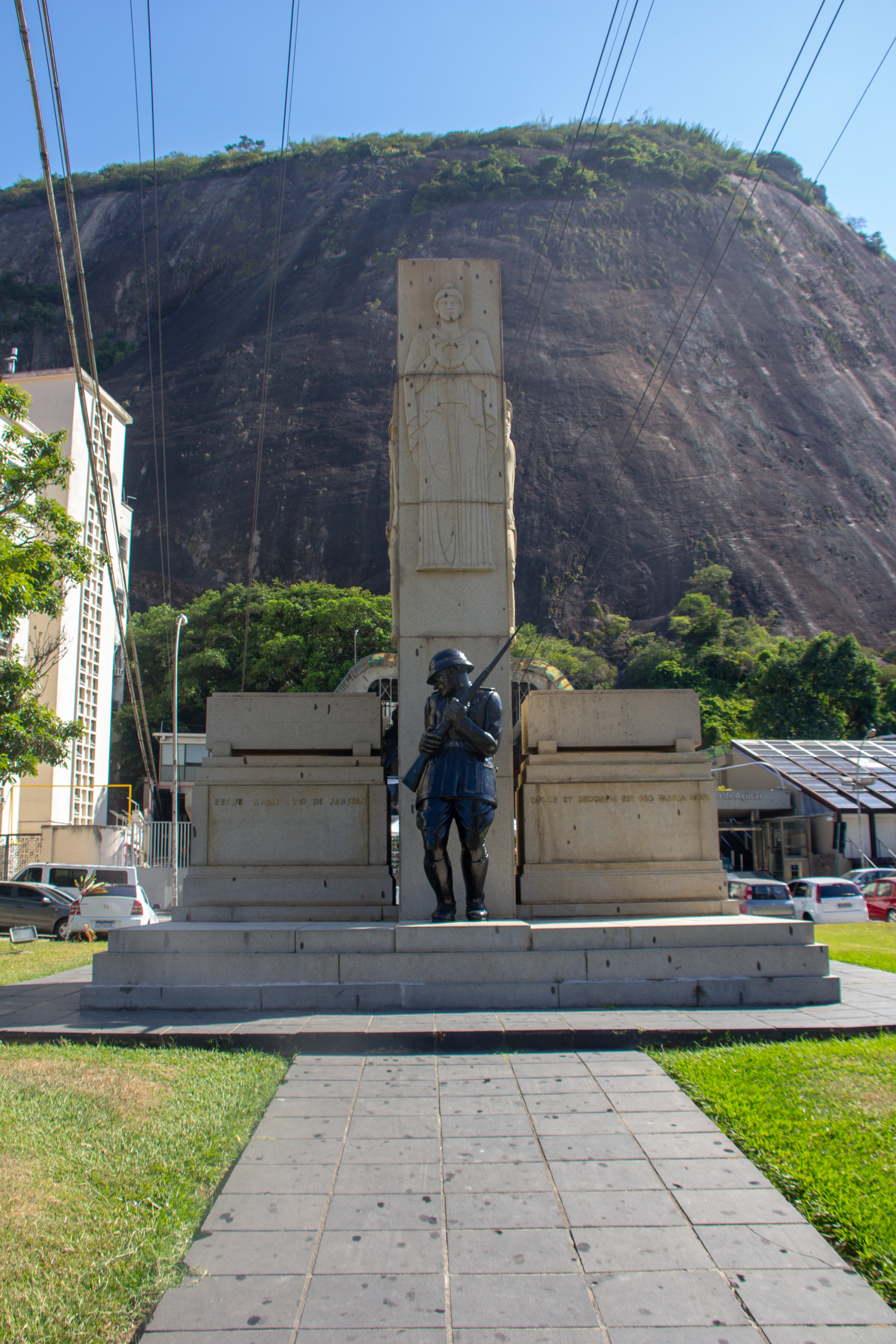
Monument to the Victims of the Uprising, at Praia Vermelha, Urca, Rio de Janeiro

Despite its failure, the communist revolt gave Vargas the pretext for acquiring more power. After November 1935, the National Congress of Brazil approved a series of laws that restricted its own power, while the executive gained almost unlimited powers of repression. This process culminated in the coup of 10 November 1937, which closed the National Congress of Brazil, canceled the upcoming 1938 presidential elections, and installed Getúlio Vargas as a dictator. This period of dictatorship is called the Estado Novo, which lasted until 1945.

=== Casualties ===
There is no complete assessment of the victims, with loyalists and insurgents joining in all the events that took place. Among the insurgents it is difficult to find a complete list with the names of the victims, but it is estimated that at least one hundred died in the Recife uprising alone and another twenty in the Praia Vermelha uprising in Rio de Janeiro, which leaves uncounted the deaths occurring in Natal and other barracks in Rio de Janeiro.

Among the loyalist troops involved in the fighting there were 22 fatalities. The Brazilian Army lists a total of 30 victims without, however, disclosing whether they were loyalists or insurgents.

In early 1936, in an attempt to find those responsible for the failure of the uprising, Prestes ordered the 14-year-old Elza Fernandes, girlfriend of the PCB's secretary general, to be assassinated. Prestes suspected that she was a police informant, which later proved to be a mistake.

== Gallery ==
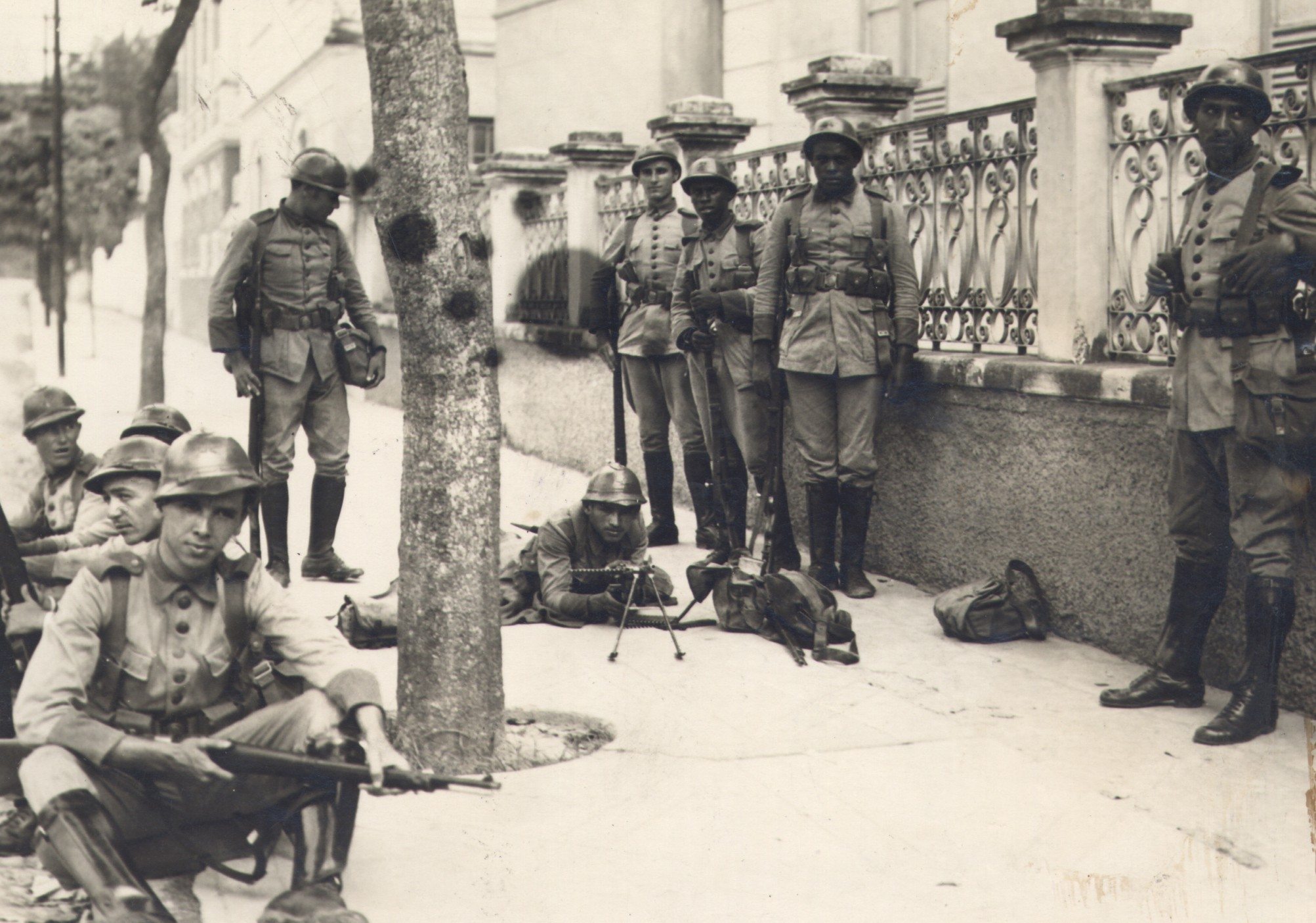
Loyalist troops

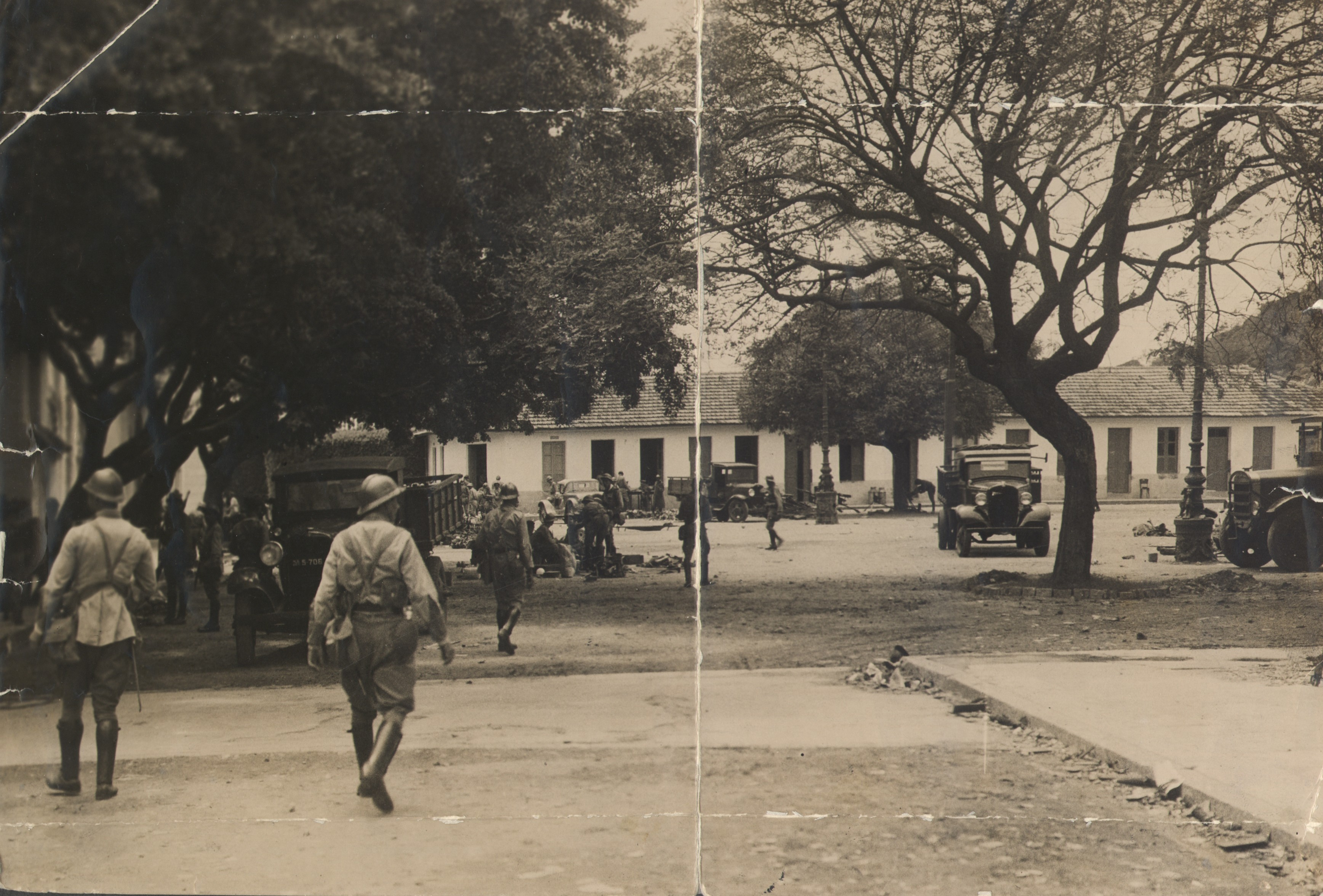
Barracks of the 3rd Infantry Regiment, epicentre of the communist uprising

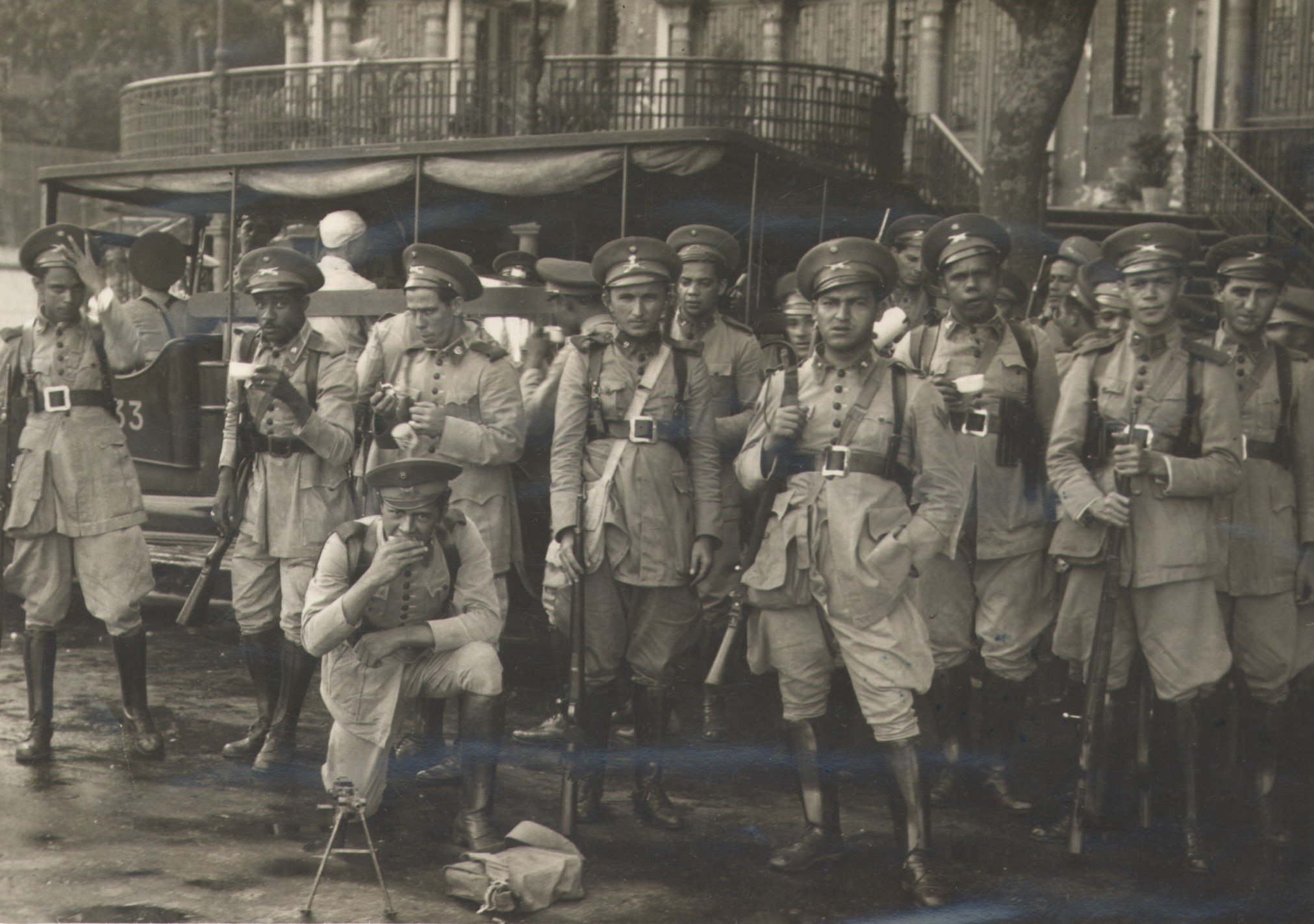
Rio de Janeiro Police Corps near the seat of government

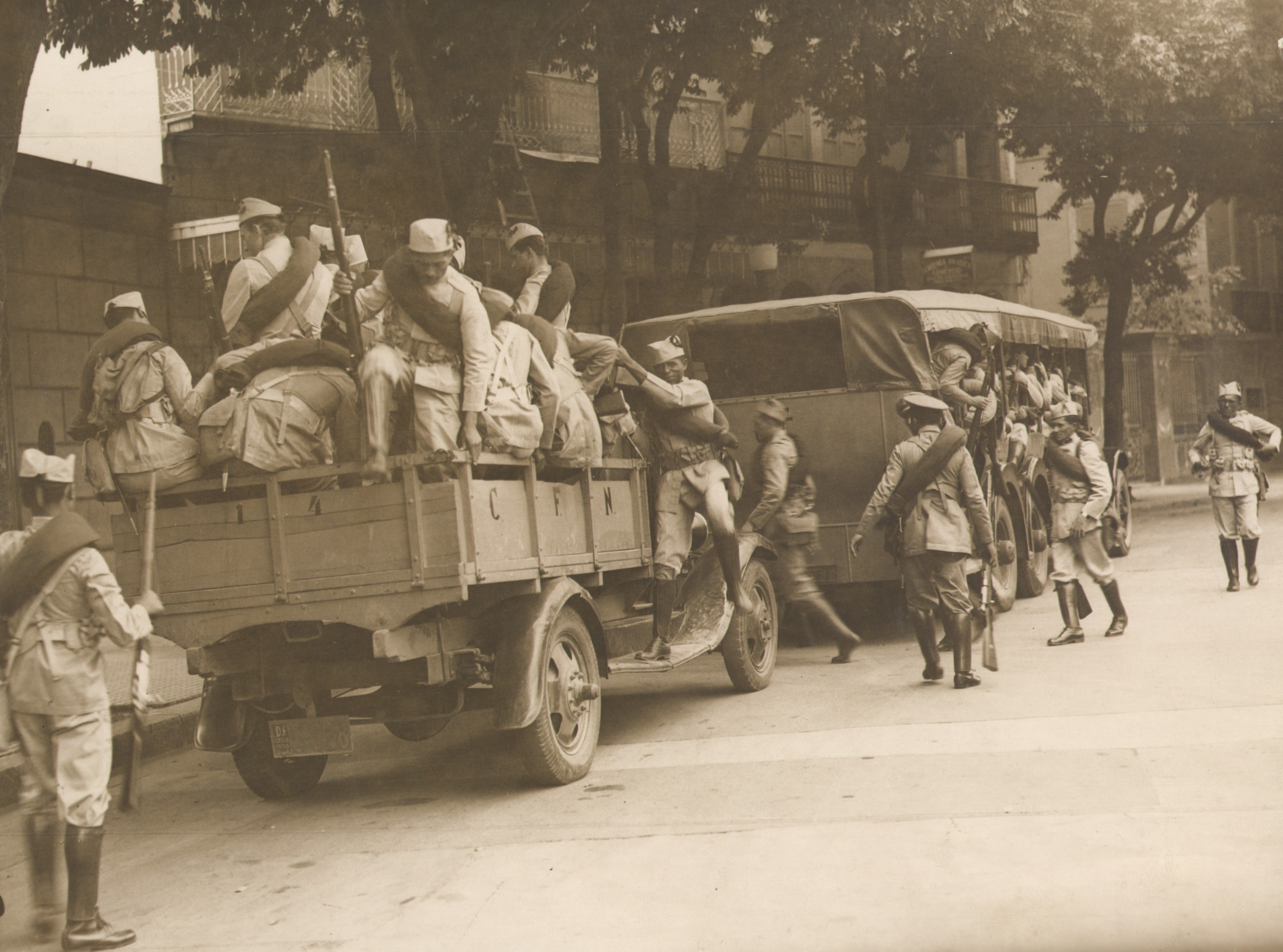
Brazilian Marines arriving to hold back advancing communist troops

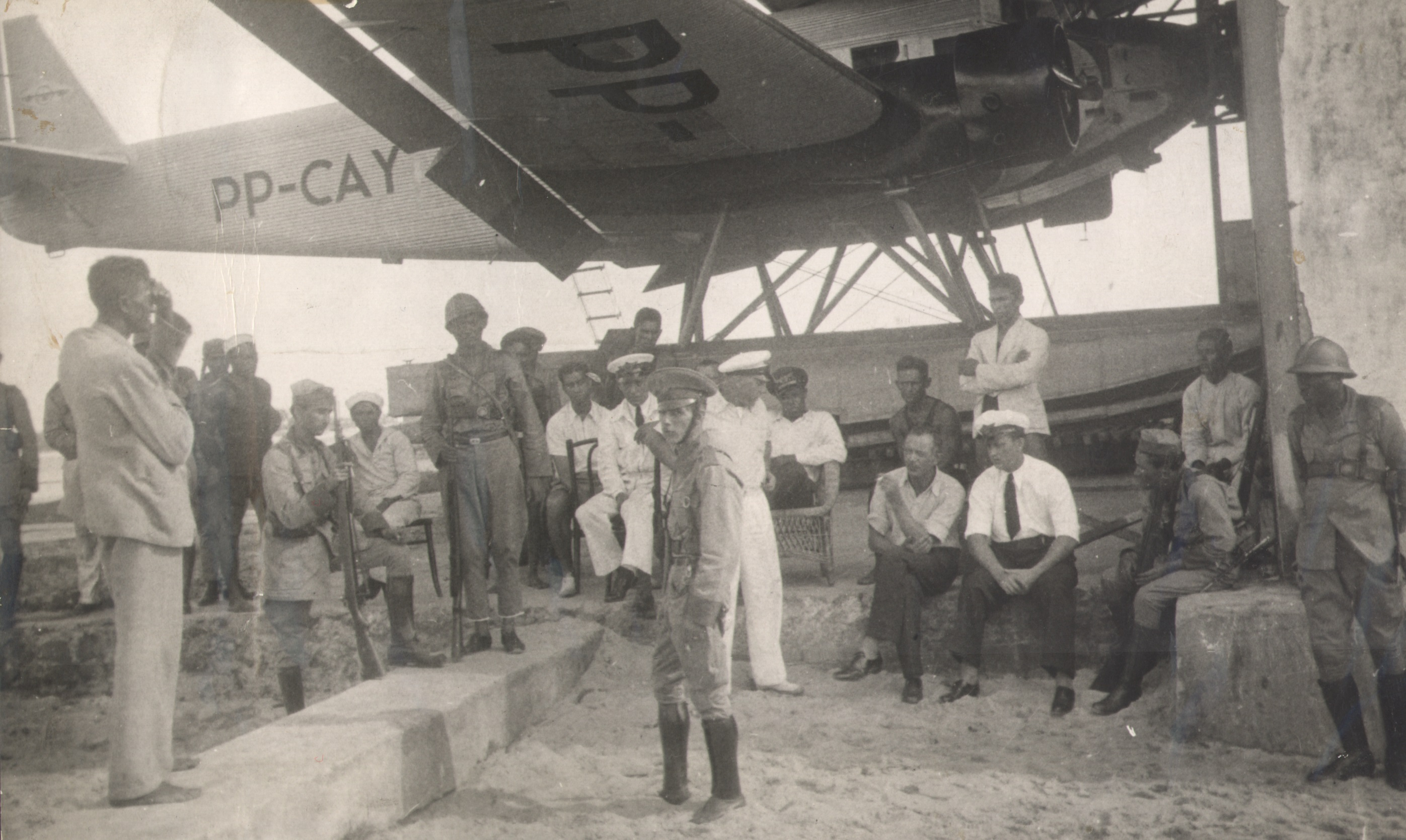
Communist civilians and rebel soldiers stand guard near the captured aircraft

== See also ==
- Vargas era
