= Luís Carlos Prestes =

Brazilian revolutionary, politician, and Communist Party general-secretary (1898-1990)

- Prestes in 1959

Senator for the Federal District
- In office February 1, 1946 – January 9, 1948

General Secretary of the Brazilian Communist Party
- In office August 28, 1943 – May 12, 1980
- Preceded by: Antônio Maciel Bonfim
- Succeeded by: Giocondo Dias

Personal details
- Born: Luís Carlos Prestes; January 3, 1898 Porto Alegre, Rio Grande do Sul, Brazil
- Died: March 7, 1990 (aged 92) Rio de Janeiro, Brazil
- Party: Brazilian Communist Party (1934–1984)
- Spouses: Olga Benário (m. 1934; died 1942) Altamira Sobral (m. 1950)
- Children: 8, (including Anita)
- Education: Military School of Realengo
- Profession: Military engineer
- Nickname: The Knight of Hope

Military service
- Allegiance: Brazil
- Branch/service: Brazilian Army
- Years of service: 1919–1936
- Rank: Captain
- Battles/wars: 1924 tenente revolt; Communist uprising of 1935
- Awards: Order of the October Revolution; Order of Friendship; Bertha Lutz Award

Luís Carlos Prestes (January 3, 1898 – March 7, 1990) was a Brazilian revolutionary, military officer, and politician who served as general secretary of the Brazilian Communist Party from 1943 to 1980 and as a senator for the Federal District from 1946 to 1948. He first achieved national prominence for his role in the 1924 tenentist revolt and in the subsequent march of the Prestes Column, which earned him the nickname The Knight of Hope.

Beginning in 1924, Prestes emerged as one of the principal leaders of an unsuccessful military revolt. After its defeat, he helped lead a force of rebel troops that later became known as the Prestes Column, which spent three years marching through the Brazilian interior in resistance to the federal government before going into exile in Bolivia.

Prestes later became general secretary of the Brazilian Communist Party, which advocated measures including suspension of payments on the national debt, nationalization of foreign-owned companies, and land reform. He was imprisoned after the failed communist uprising of 1935 and was later sentenced to 30 years in prison for ordering the execution of the teenager Elza Fernandes. Released after World War II, he briefly served in the Senate before returning to clandestine political activity after the Communist Party was banned.

In the 1980s, Prestes broke with the leadership of the Brazilian Communist Party, accusing it of abandoning Marxist-Leninist principles. He was removed from the party leadership in 1980 and expelled in 1984. In his final years, he supported Leonel Brizola in the 1989 presidential election, which was won by Fernando Collor de Mello.

== Early life and Tenente revolt ==
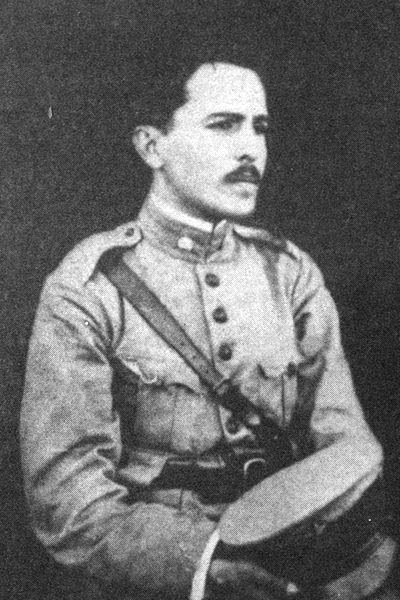
A young Prestes in military uniform

Prestes was born in Porto Alegre, Rio Grande do Sul, on January 3, 1898. His father had been an army officer. In 1904 the family moved to Rio de Janeiro so that his father could seek medical treatment, but the family's circumstances worsened after his father died in 1908. Prestes's mother, Maria Leocádia Felizardo Prestes, supported the family by teaching languages and music before obtaining a position in the public-school system in 1915.

Prestes studied at the Colégio Militar and later at the Military School of Realengo, where future tenentes such as Antônio de Siqueira Campos and Eduardo Gomes also trained. He specialized in military engineering and graduated at the top of his class. He completed the engineering course in December 1920, finishing first in his class at both institutions.

Although he helped plan the revolt of 1922, Prestes did not take part in the "March of the 18" because he was ill with typhoid fever when the uprising began. Because he had not participated directly, he did not receive the prison sentences imposed on some of his associates, but he was transferred to Rio Grande do Sul.

When the 1924 revolt broke out, Prestes became an important figure in the tenentes movement, which took its name from the participation of lower-ranking army officers in the uprisings of 1922 and 1924. Although he had not been involved in the temporary occupation of São Paulo in July 1924, he later joined the rebels from São Paulo and helped lead the combined force that became known as the Prestes Column. Before taking part in the uprising, Prestes requested medical leave and sought discharge from active service, arguing that he could not rebel while still bound by his oath to the constitutional authorities.

Although the movement later became famous as the Prestes Column, its formal commander was Miguel Costa, while Prestes served as chief of staff, a distinction emphasized in later historiography.

The column marched for nearly three years across thirteen Brazilian states, covering about 25,000 kilometers (16,000 miles). Organized in opposition to the political order of the First Republic (1889–1930), it did not directly threaten the government but remained capable of resisting repeated efforts to destroy it. In 1927, the column went into exile in Bolivia.

== In exile (1927–1930) ==
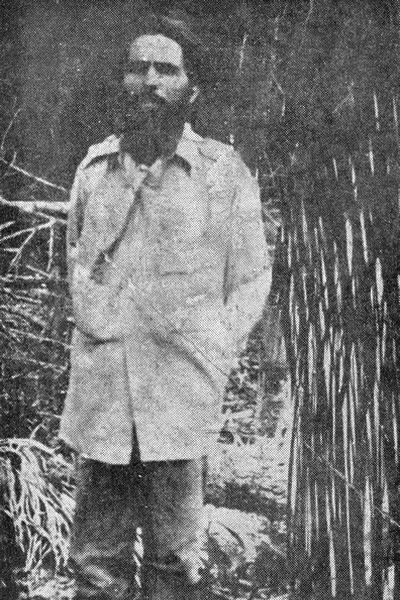
Luis Carlos Prestes in Bolivia in 1928, shortly after the end of the Prestes Column's march through Brazil's interior

In Bolivia, Prestes worked on road-building, sanitation, and other infrastructure projects for the British enterprise Bolivian Company Limited. In late 1927, the secretary-general of the Partido Comunista Brasileiro (Brazilian Communist Party; PCB), Astrojildo Pereira, visited him there, left him works on Marxism, and proposed an alliance with the party.

Prestes declined Pereira's proposal at the time and remained in Bolivia until late 1928, when he moved to Argentina and found work as an engineer. During this period he read Marxist works and moved closer to socialism, a process also shaped by his contact with Rodolfo Ghioldi, a leading figure in Argentine communism, and August Kleine, a representative of the Communist International in South America from 1930 to 1934.

== Revolution of 1930 ==
The Revolution of 1930 ended the Old Republic and brought Getúlio Vargas to power as provisional president. Many moderate tenentes supported the movement, but Prestes did not.

Supporters of the revolution sought Prestes's participation, and he met Vargas in Porto Alegre, where he set out his support for a socialist revolution. Vargas reportedly donated 800 contos de réis to the revolutionary cause.

Prestes, however, regarded Vargas as the leader of a bourgeois revolution and considered the Liberal Alliance incapable of producing fundamental change. He tried to organize an alternative movement, the League of Revolutionary Action, but it failed to attract broad support. He subsequently entered another period of exile, this time in Uruguay.

== Alignment to Marxism ==
In 1931, Prestes moved to the USSR, where he worked as an engineer and continued his study of communism. At the end of 1934, he returned to Brazil accompanied by his future wife, Olga Benário, an agent of the Communist International assigned to provide security for him.

In 1935, Prestes became a member of the executive committee of the Communist International and was reported to have gained Stalin's confidence. That same year, he became the leader of the Aliança Nacional Libertadora (National Liberation Alliance, ANL), a left-wing popular front composed of socialists, communists, and other opposition groups. Led by the Communist Party, it opposed Vargas's government and its repression of organized labor. Prestes served as the alliance's honorary president.

During the mid-1930s, Vargas adopted an increasingly authoritarian style of rule and sought to suppress opponents on the left. At the same time, he developed ties with agrarian oligarchies and with the Integralists, a fascist movement with a significant urban base. The growth of the ANL led Congress and the federal government to take further measures against the left.

As former tenentes such as Eduardo Gomes, Juracy Magalhães, and Juarez Távora moved rightward, Prestes became increasingly identified with the communist opposition. After the ANL issued a manifesto in 1935 calling for the overthrow of the Vargas government, the organization was declared illegal. Later that year, Prestes and other ANL members launched the uprising of November 1935, which was quickly suppressed. Prestes escaped immediate arrest, but by March 1936 he and Olga had been imprisoned. Because Olga was a foreign national, the government deported her to Nazi Germany. In 1943, while still in prison, Prestes was elected general secretary of the Communist Party of Brazil.

== Imprisonment ==
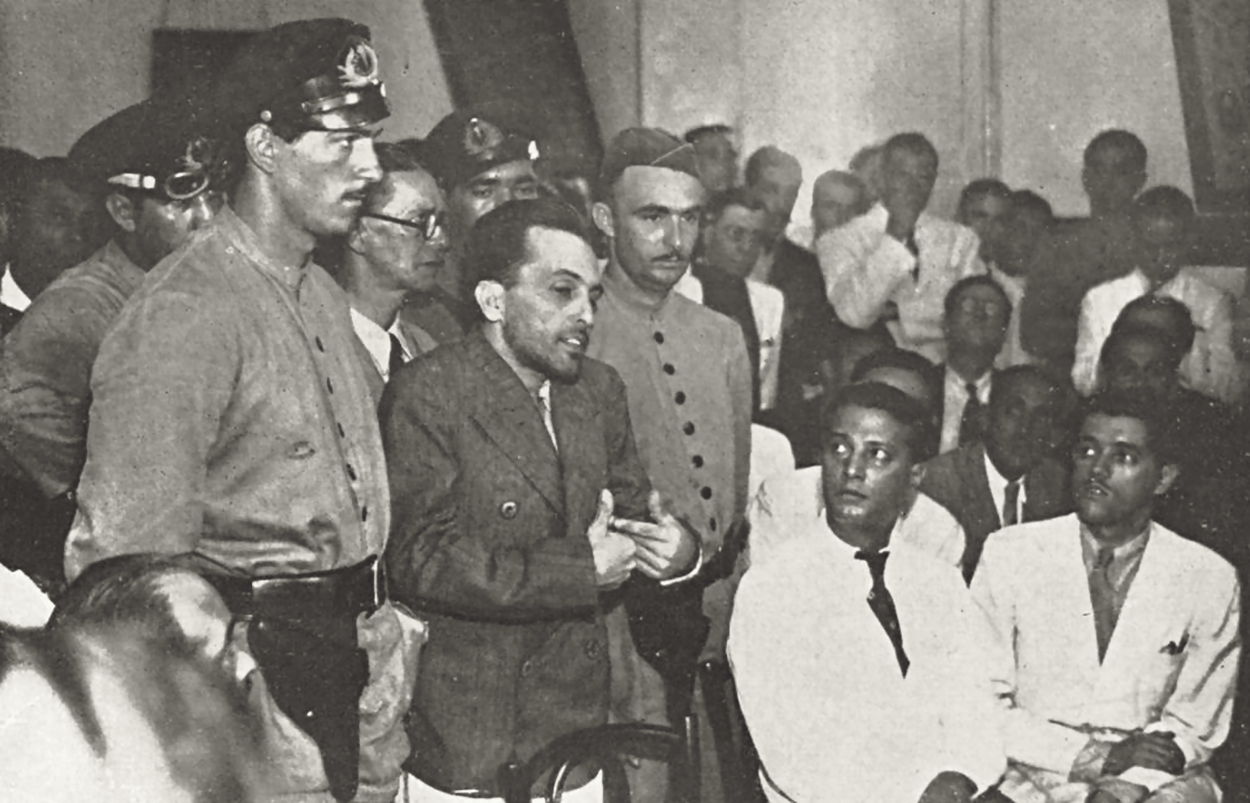
Prestes at the Security Court in 1937

Following the passage of a National Security Act in March 1935, the Brazilian Congress classified left-wing opposition as subversive and granted the federal government broader powers against political movements. In July 1935, the government moved against the ANL by raiding its offices, seizing propaganda and records, and arresting leaders. After the ANL's failed armed uprising in November, Prestes and other communist leaders were imprisoned, and repression of the communist movement intensified.

During this period, Vargas maintained a working relationship with Integralism, whose members included prominent antisemites. His government deported Prestes's pregnant wife, Olga Benario, to Nazi Germany, where she was later killed in a concentration camp. Their daughter, Anita Leocádia Prestes, was born in a prison in Germany and was later brought to Brazil by Prestes's mother after an international campaign on the family's behalf.

The leaders of the uprising were arrested and tried for sedition in 1937. Prestes was sentenced to 16 years in prison.

== Political career ==
After Brazil aligned itself with the Allies and the Estado Novo weakened, political prisoners were released. Prestes was freed in May 1945 under an amnesty for political prisoners.

After the overthrow of Vargas in October 1945, new elections were held. Prestes commented on Vargas's political flexibility, saying, "Getúlio is very flexible. When it was fashionable to be a fascist, he was a fascist. Now that it is fashionable to be democratic, he will be a democrat." Despite his imprisonment under Vargas and the fate of Olga Benário, Prestes nevertheless supported him in the name of national unity.

Prestes then reorganized the Communist Party, which at that time had about 4,000 members. In the elections that followed, the communists received about 700,000 votes, or 15 percent of the total.

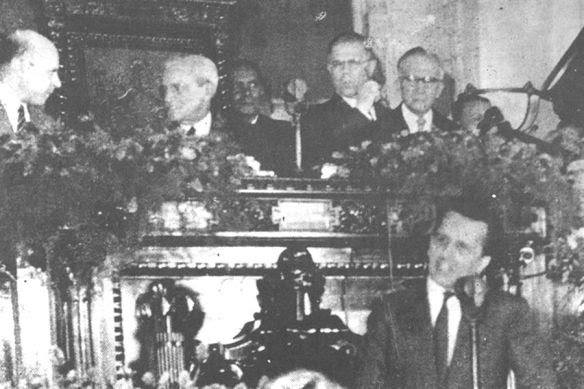
Prestes (bottom right) speaking on the floor of Congress as Senator in 1946

In the elections of December 2, 1945, Prestes won the largest number of votes in the race for senator from the Federal District. His election coincided with the beginning of the Cold War. In the same election, Prestes was also elected federal deputy for the Federal District, Pernambuco, and Rio Grande do Sul, but he relinquished those seats in order to take his place in the Senate.

As a senator, Prestes took part in drafting the 1946 constitution. Soon afterward, however, the Communist Party again came under pressure. In May 1947, the Brazilian government outlawed the party, and Congress subsequently removed its communist members. Prestes then returned to clandestine political activity. During the 1946 Constituent Assembly, Prestes supported amendment no. 3,165, introduced by deputy Miguel Couto Filho, which sought to prohibit the entry of Japanese immigrants into Brazil. In 2013, the Federal Senate formally restored Prestes's mandate and annulled the 1948 cassation.

Prestes did not support any candidate in the 1950 election and remained a critic of Vargas until Vargas's suicide in 1954. He later supported Juscelino Kubitschek in 1955 and assumed a more public role, even while the PCB remained illegal. During the presidency of João Goulart, Prestes and other figures on the left saw the possibility of far-reaching reforms for workers and peasants, while many in the middle class, the military, and conservative sectors viewed the growth of the left with alarm. The military overthrew Goulart in 1964 and established a dictatorship.

Under military rule, Prestes again went underground and later into exile as the dictatorship targeted communist activists and leaders. During this period, divisions within the Brazilian communist movement deepened. Prestes led the pro-Soviet faction that remained identified with the Brazilian Communist Party (PCB), while Maoists organized the separate Communist Party of Brazil (PCdoB). Unlike armed groups on the revolutionary left after 1964, Prestes's faction did not adopt urban guerrilla warfare.

== Later life and death ==
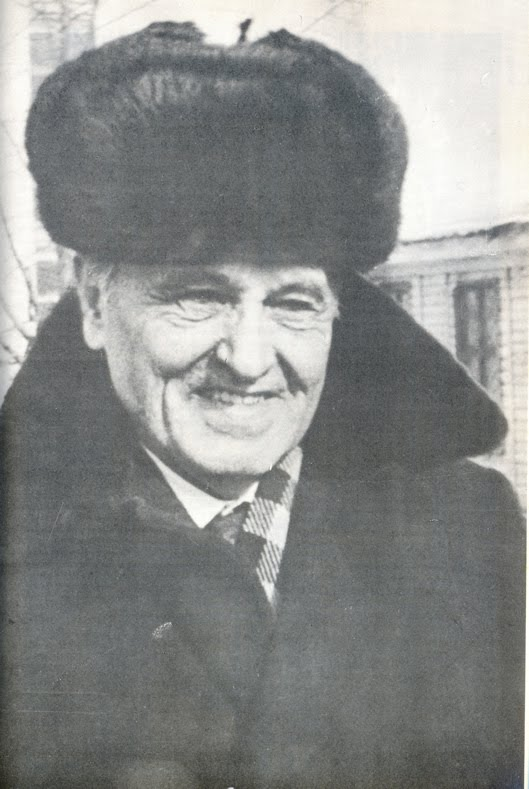
Prestes in exile in the Soviet Union in the mid-1970s

In 1970, Prestes went to Moscow with his second wife, Maria Prestes, and their children, returning to Brazil only after the 1979 amnesty for political prisoners and exiles. By then the PCB had been weakened by repression and internal divisions, and many party members no longer accepted Prestes's continued leadership. He was removed from the post of secretary-general in 1980.

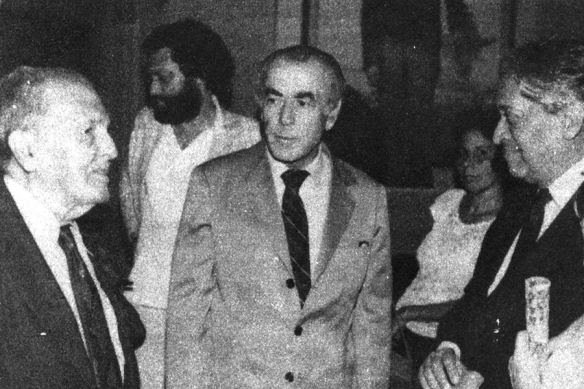
Prestes (left) with Leonel Brizola (center), whom Prestes supported in the 1980s after leaving the PCB

After leaving the PCB, Prestes became associated with the Democratic Labour Party and supported Leonel Brizola's presidential campaign in 1989. According to a later interview by Maria Prestes, he also lived to see both the reforms associated with perestroika and the fall of the Berlin Wall, and lamented the way the Wall came down.

In his final years, Prestes experienced financial hardship and received support from the architect Oscar Niemeyer, a longtime communist sympathizer and one of the principal designers of Brasília. Prestes died of a heart attack on March 7, 1990, at the age of 92.

== Legacy ==
In 2017, the Memorial Luiz Carlos Prestes, designed by Oscar Niemeyer, was inaugurated in Porto Alegre in his honor.

== See also ==
- Olga Benário Prestes
- Carlos Marighella
- João Goulart
- Getúlio Vargas
- Brazilian Communist Party
- Tenentism
- Brazilian communist uprising of 1935
- The Knight of Hope, biography of Prestes by Jorge Amado
- Coluna Prestes, that preceded and perhaps inspired the Chinese Long March

== Footnotes ==
Party political offices
Preceded by Antônio Maciel Bonfim	General-Secretary of Brazilian Communist Party; 1943–1980	Succeeded by Giocondo Dias
