= Integralist Uprising =

1938 failed coup in Brazil

- Part of Vargas Era and the Interwar period
- The Guanabara Palace on the morning of May 11, after the Integralists' attack
Date	10–11 May 1938
Location	Rio de Janeiro, Brazil
Result	Brazilian government victory: Rebellion suppressed

Belligerents
Brazil: Police Corps; Brazilian Navy; Marine Corps	Brazilian Integralist Action (Note: Under the banner of the Brazilian Cultural Association due to political parties being extinguished by presidential decree in December 1937. See Prelude below for more information.)

Commanders and leaders
Getúlio Vargas; Eurico Gaspar Dutra	Plínio Salgado; Severo Fournier

Casualties and losses
18: 4 killed 14 wounded	Unknown

The Integralist Uprising (Portuguese: Levante Integralista) was a failed coup by the Brazilian Integralist Action (AIB) against the government of president Getúlio Vargas on 11 May 1938 during the Estado Novo in Brazil. The AIB was created due to the radicalization of politics following the successful Revolution of 1930, which had brought Vargas to power, and the 1932 Constitutionalist Revolution, which had undermined revolutionary politics in favor of political extremes. Its creator, Plínio Salgado, had been influenced by fascism, ultimately starting the ritual-based, far-right organization.

In 1935, another movement at the opposite end of the political spectrum, the communist-backed National Liberation Alliance, attempted a failed revolution against the federal government. This gave pretext for the government to move in an authoritarian and repressive direction against the constitutional government which had prevailed since 1934, culminating in the 1937 coup which installed Vargas as dictator and head of the Estado Novo regime. The coup had been promoted by Integralists, and the key document which had enabled hysteria and allowed the coup to happen, the Cohen Plan, was written by Integralist captain Olímpio Mourão Filho.

Integralists were disillusioned with the new regime. From the dictatorship's inception, Vargas had failed to inform them of the Estado Novo's creation until it was done officially. In December, the AIB was forced to dissolve and reorganize as the Brazilian Cultural Association when Vargas decreed all political parties were banned, and their rituals and symbols were outlawed via a provision in the Constitution of 1937. Vargas also rescinded his promise to give the position of Minister of Education to the Integralists. This breakdown in Integralist–government relations culminated in an Integralist conspiracy which concluded in a catastrophic attempt at revolt on 10 March 1938, ending in many arrests.

On the night of 10 May through the early morning of 11 May, the rebels tried a poorly-organized revolt which almost killed Vargas and kidnapped several military leaders. Vargas and his daughter Alzira had a shootout with Integralists outside Vargas's residence, the Guanabara Palace. Four Brazilian soldiers were killed and another 18 were wounded. Upon its conclusion, Salgado was exiled to Portugal and 1,500 Integralists were imprisoned.

== Background ==
=== Context (early 1930s) ===
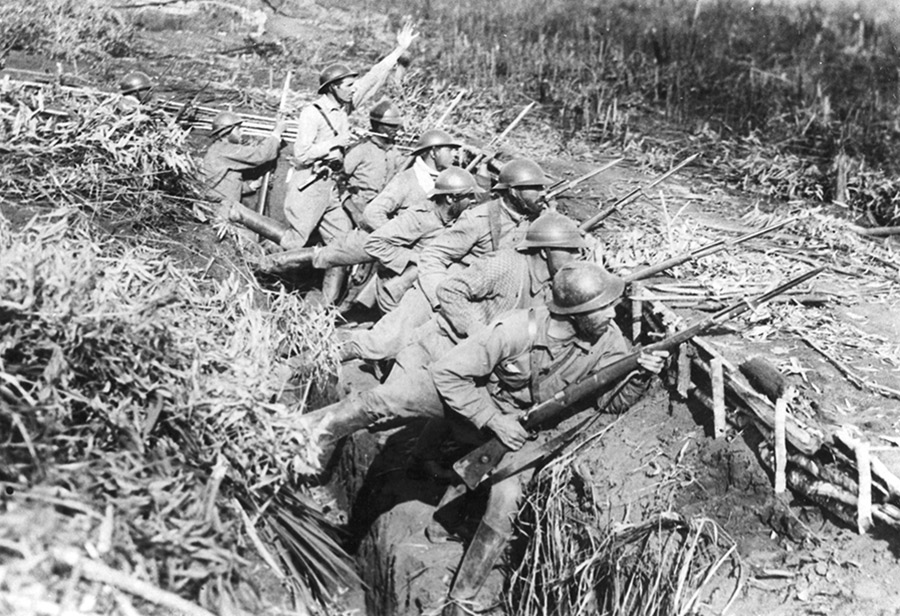
Following the failed 1932 Constitutionalist Revolution (São Paulo troops pictured), both liberal constitutionalists and tenentes would be undermined in favor of the extremes of communists and Integralists.

Revolutionary leader Getúlio Vargas became president of Brazil following the month-long Revolution of 1930 against the oligarchic Old Republic. The new regime which Vargas would assume leadership of was built upon a heterogenous coalition of forces which were united only in their opposition to incumbent president Washington Luís, whom Vargas replaced after the senior military removed him from office. Of the revolutionaries, which included the higher military, coffee growers, and politicians, the two major groups were liberal constitutionalists and the tenentes, or semi-authoritarian nationalist junior officers. The former yearned for free elections and civil liberties, while the latter feared elections as being too soon. After Vargas took power, the constitutionalists grew suspicious of the president and the tenentes following several delays to their requests for electoral reform. In early 1932, the Democratic Party of São Paulo, the main party of the constitutionalists, formed a United Front with other parties in the state. They rose in revolt during the Constitutionalist Revolution in July 1932. However, the revolt failed after two months due to regionalist sentiments alienating the São Paulo rebels from uniting with other states in opposition to the federal government.

Through a series of decrees, Vargas organized a National Constituent Assembly to be elected and create a new constitution. They did so, finishing in July 1934, and afterward elected Vargas to a four-year term ending in May 1938. In theory, the National Congress, divided into the Chamber of Deputies and the Federal Senate, gained and lost some power, with the presidency sustaining the greatest blow to its power. Historian Jordan M. Young states, "In reality, however, the legislative branch was the docile instrument of a strong chief executive. Anything and everything that Vargas wanted was granted."

=== Integralism (1932–1937) ===
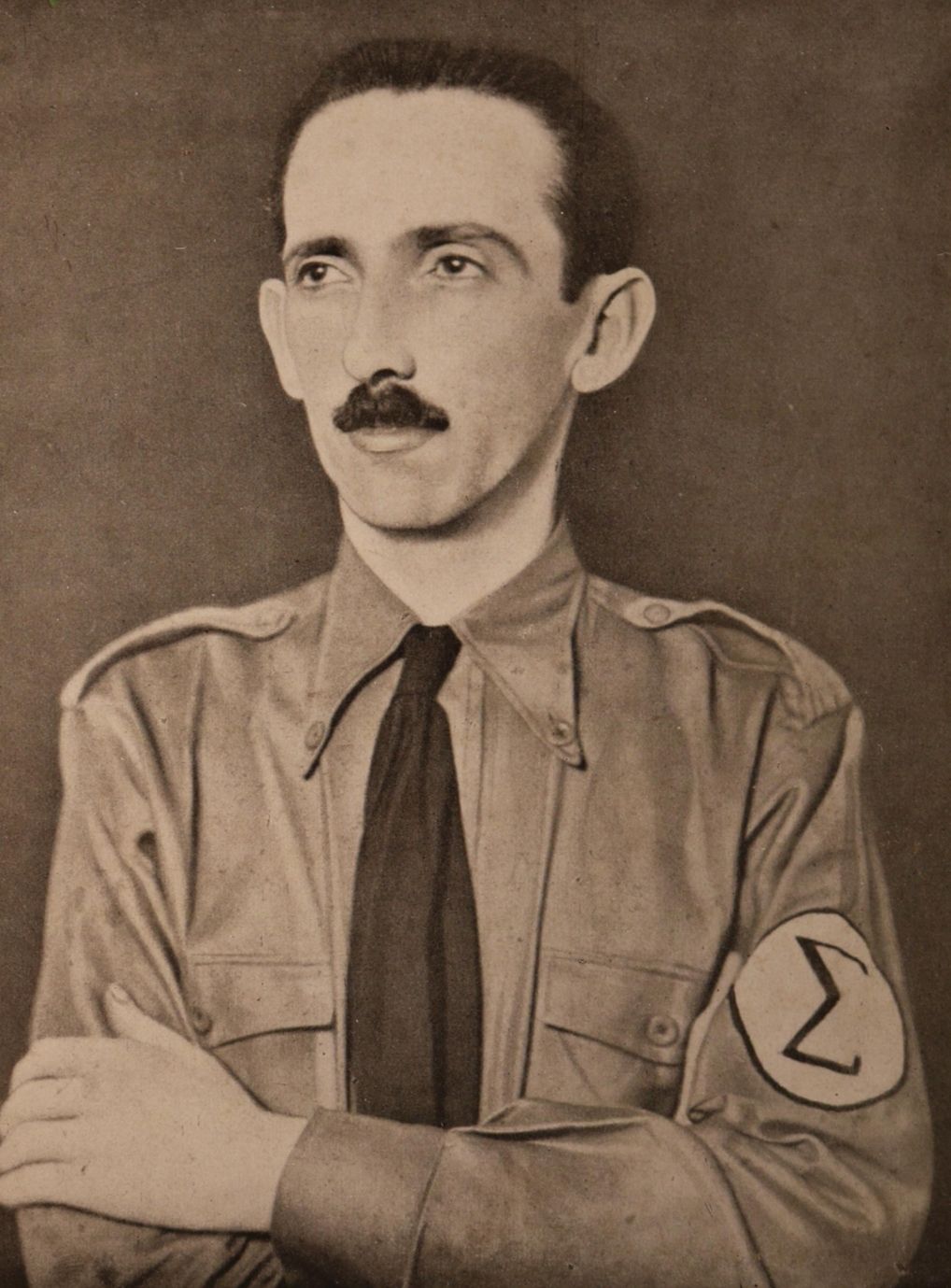
Plínio Salgado, 1935

Brazilian politics were becoming increasingly radicalized during the transition in government. Liberal constitutionalists and tenentes were being replaced by political extremes. While the catastrophic revolt of 1932 undermined the liberal constitutionalists, the tenentes were not accustomed to a popular following, and despite being the leading voice for socioeconomic issues after 1930, they lost unity after mid-1932 and, essentially, disappeared after 1934.

The Communist Party of Brazil formed a popular front called the National Liberation Alliance (ANL). (Note: This article uses Portuguese abbreviations. ANL is an abbreviation for Alliança Nacional Libertadora, or the National Liberation Alliance.) The former middle class liberal constitutionalists turned to rallying for the ANL, in part due to the appeal of the movement's honorary president and former leader of the Prestes Column, Luís Carlos Prestes. The 1930 Revolution's loose-knit Liberal Alliance was being quickly supplanted by more radical, wider, national political movements.

Since its creation in 1932, the Brazilian Integralist Action (AIB), (Note: Portuguese abbreviation for Ação Integralista Brasileira, or Brazilian Integralist Action.) a far-right movement founded and headed by Plínio Salgado of São Paulo, also recruited the middle class. It was born from Salgado's trip to Europe in 1930; when he returned to Brazil, though unguided before the trip, he was an ardent believer in fascism and Italian leader Benito Mussolini. With regard to the economy and public policy, Integralists favored a Ministry of National Agriculture (composed of the existing Ministry of Agriculture and various departments of other ministries), a national banking system for both manufacturers and agrarians, and a review and reform of immigration, diplomacy, foreign debt, and foreign-owned businesses.

Integralists were given workbooks, memorizing such dialogues as, "Do you love your country? Yes, because it is a geographic, historic, and moral unity; it lives in my heart and my soul." They had special codes using hieroglyphs, including one for "shoot the officers." The organization had its own calendar beginning in 1932, and Salgado admitted his movement depended on ritual, ceremony, uniform, and symbolism. Integralists also possessed a strong belief in God and Christianity, as well as mysticism and order and progress. By late 1937, the movement claimed between 300,000 and 400,000 Brazilians, though these inflated numbers are closer to between 100,000 and 200,000.

=== Communism and Integralism (1935–1937) ===
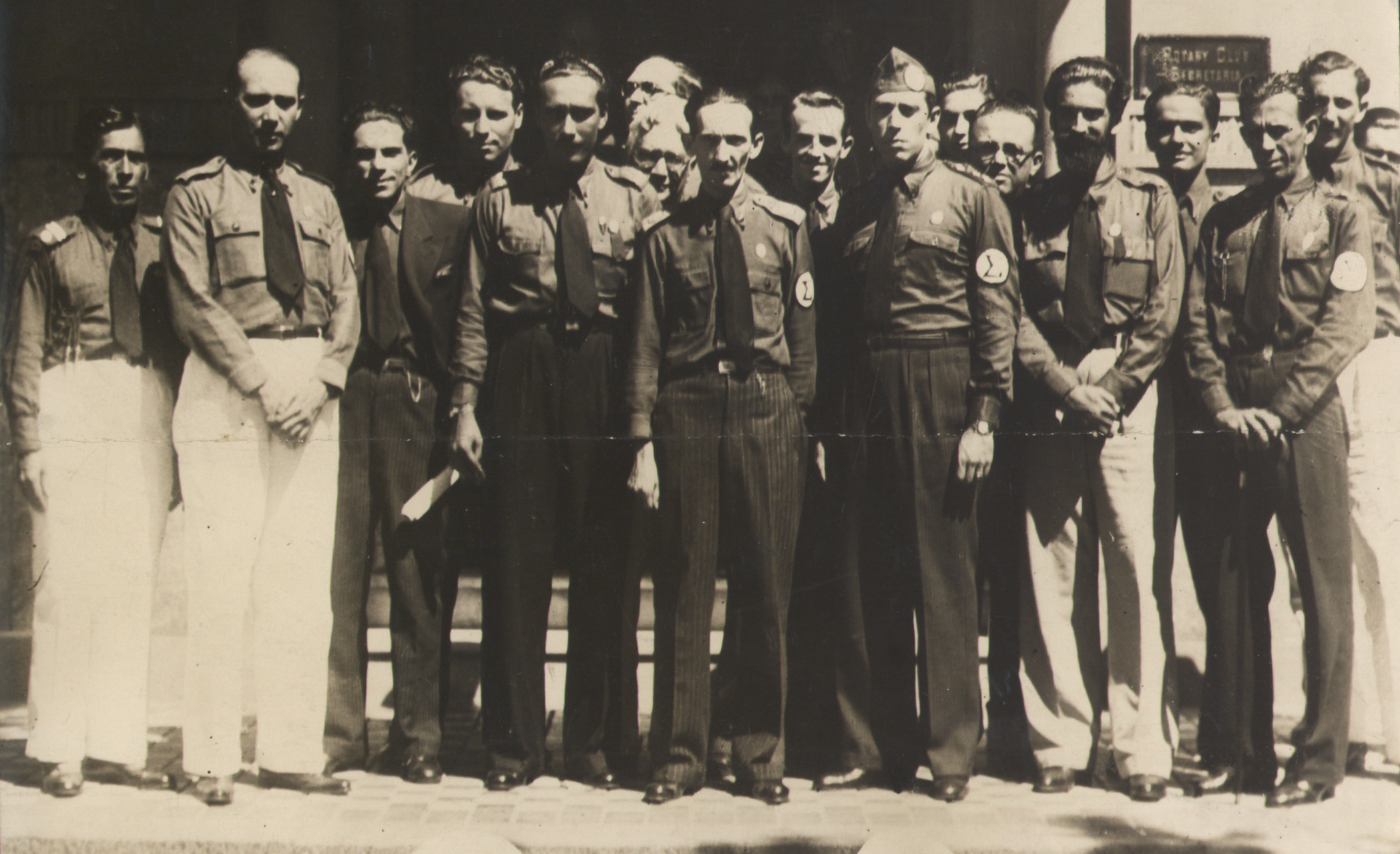
Salgado (center with mustache) and Integralists, date unknown

The ANL promised on 13 May 1935 for Prestes to deliver a manifesto on 5 July the same year. Following this, on 12 July, after a week of the ANL's press turning belligerent against the government, the federal police seized archives from the ANL's headquarters and padlocked its doors. In the name of the ANL, three separate insurrections broke out at Natal, Recife, and Rio de Janeiro in late November 1935. All failed to gain support and faltered quickly. In response, the government declared a national state of emergency and established government bodies (such as the National Commission for the Repression of Communism) to subdue the opposition.

It was in this anti-communist climate that the left was undermined and the nation as a whole backed president Vargas. Additionally, Salgado had offered Vargas 100,000 green shirts to help the government during the short insurrection. Integralists looked to the presidential election of 1938 with, in the words of historian John W. F. Dulles, "an assurance born of the Communist rebellion." Many important officials were associated with Integralism; the director of the Government Mint and an important official of the Bank of Brazil were both on the "Council of 40," the top political organ of the AIB, and on the "Council of 400," in charge of promoting Integralism throughout Brazil, sat members of the state police and the Armed Forces. Police Chief Filinto Müller and numerous generals, potentially even Vargas himself at one point, fully backed the AIB. Benito Mussolini's son-in-law Galeazzo Ciano sent contributions to the movement. Salgado entered the presidential election in June 1937, both claiming he was going to save democracy in the name of Jesus Christ and threatening enemies of the AIB with punishment. He joined the race at a time when the presidential campaign seemed to be in shambles with government candidate José Américo de Almeida leaning to the left and attacking the government, an imminent war in Europe, and the military and federal government wishing for interventions in states they deemed difficult.

An ominous pattern of reaction and repression followed the defeat of the November insurrections. Once Vargas received emergency powers, he did not relinquish them. The new atmosphere, hotly antiliberal, gave expression precisely to those groups most openly committed to the suspension of the forms of liberal constitutionalism.

— Historian Robert M. Levine

In late September 1937, captain Olímpio Mourão Filho, an Integralist, was found typing a plan in the office of the Army Chief of Staff, eventually reaching senior officials who exposed it to the nation. Newspapers were filled with the Integralist's fabricated plan calling for a communist takeover and hundreds to be massacred. It was only revealed years later that, as a member of the AIB's "historical department," Filho was drafting a theoretical communist attack to prepare a counterattack, and that the publicized Cohen Plan, as it was called, differed from his original version. The impression on Congress was strong, and they met the day after the plan was made public (1 October) to declare a state of war.

Francisco Campos authored a new constitution, approved by a strong majority of the military. When Campos met with Salgado to tell him about the secretive plan for a new regime, Salgado expressed support even if he did not agree entirely with the strong government prescribed by the constitution, telling Campos the Integralists were essentially democratic. Campos assured Salgado the Integralists would become the "base of the New State", and the two men got along extremely well.

== Prelude ==
=== Vargas's coup and Integralist–government relations (1937–1938) ===
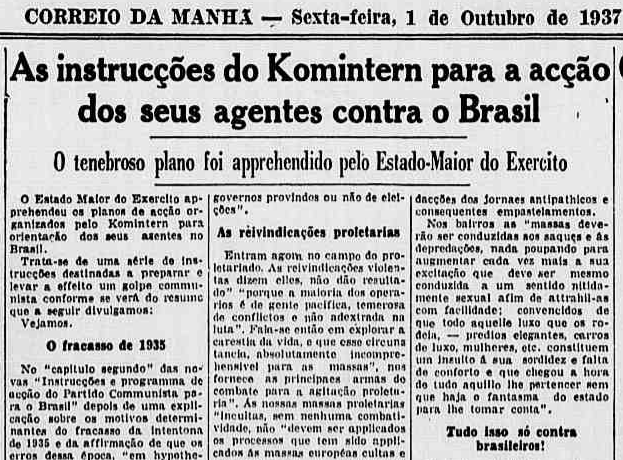
The 1937 coup was largely enabled by the Cohen Plan (Correio da Manhã newspaper report pictured). The Integralists, though initially supportive of the coup which created a dictatorship, were quickly disillusioned by Vargas's treatment of them.

Events escalated quickly. On 1 November, Integralists held the parade of "50,000 Green Shirts" (though, in reality, Vargas's counters reported it was closer to 17,000), observed by president Vargas and military aides, including the pro-Integralist general Newton Cavalcanti. Salgado declared the marchers were "taking this opportunity to affirm their solidarity with the President of the Republic and the Armed Forces in their fight against Communism and anarchical democracy, and to proclaim the principles of a new regime", adding the fight was against international capitalism, and finally stated, "What I desire is not to be President of the Republic, but simply the adviser of my country."

Instead of gambling his power with elections, on 10 November Vargas, with military and Integralist support, abrogated the 1934 constitution in favor of Campos's quasi-totalitarian one, gave a speech in which he attacked Congress, declared a national emergency, and transitioned the country from a failing democracy to an official dictatorship. When Vargas made his first public appearance after the installation of the new regime, the Estado Novo, on 15 November to inaugurate a statue of Brazil's first president, Deodoro da Fonseca, the Integralists were there to salute him. However, despite the Integralists's ties with the government, general Pedro Aurélio de Góis Monteiro gave, as one of his reasons for the coup of 10 November, that the strength of the Integralists could lead to their own coup.

Over the course of the Estado Novo, Integralists proved to be disillusioned. They were the only political group to remain untouched, and they believed they would gain from the coup. Vargas believed that Salgado and the Integralists were keen on pursuing the example of Adolf Hitler in replacing Paul von Hindenburg and hoped to curtail this. The first signs of the break between the government and the Integralists was Vargas's failure to mention them in his 10 November radio broadcast and Salgado being informed about the coup much later than he believed appropriate. (Note: Salgado had known about the coup via private informants prior to Campos telling him about it officially.)

By presidential decree on 2 December, all political parties were outlawed, including the AIB; by a new law code announced via a radio broadcast at midnight, 31 December, and per Article 2 of the new national constitution, only the national flag, anthem, and coat of arms would be permitted instead of those of the states' and the Integralists; and, by inquiring with Campos, Salgado learned Vargas made the appointment of a new Minister of Education contingent on the complete suppression of Integralism. Vargas had earlier offered Salgado the post, to which Salgado refused, and when Salgado reconsidered and recommended it be offered to another Integralist, Gustavo Barroso, the government ignored him.

=== Premature uprising (March 1938) ===
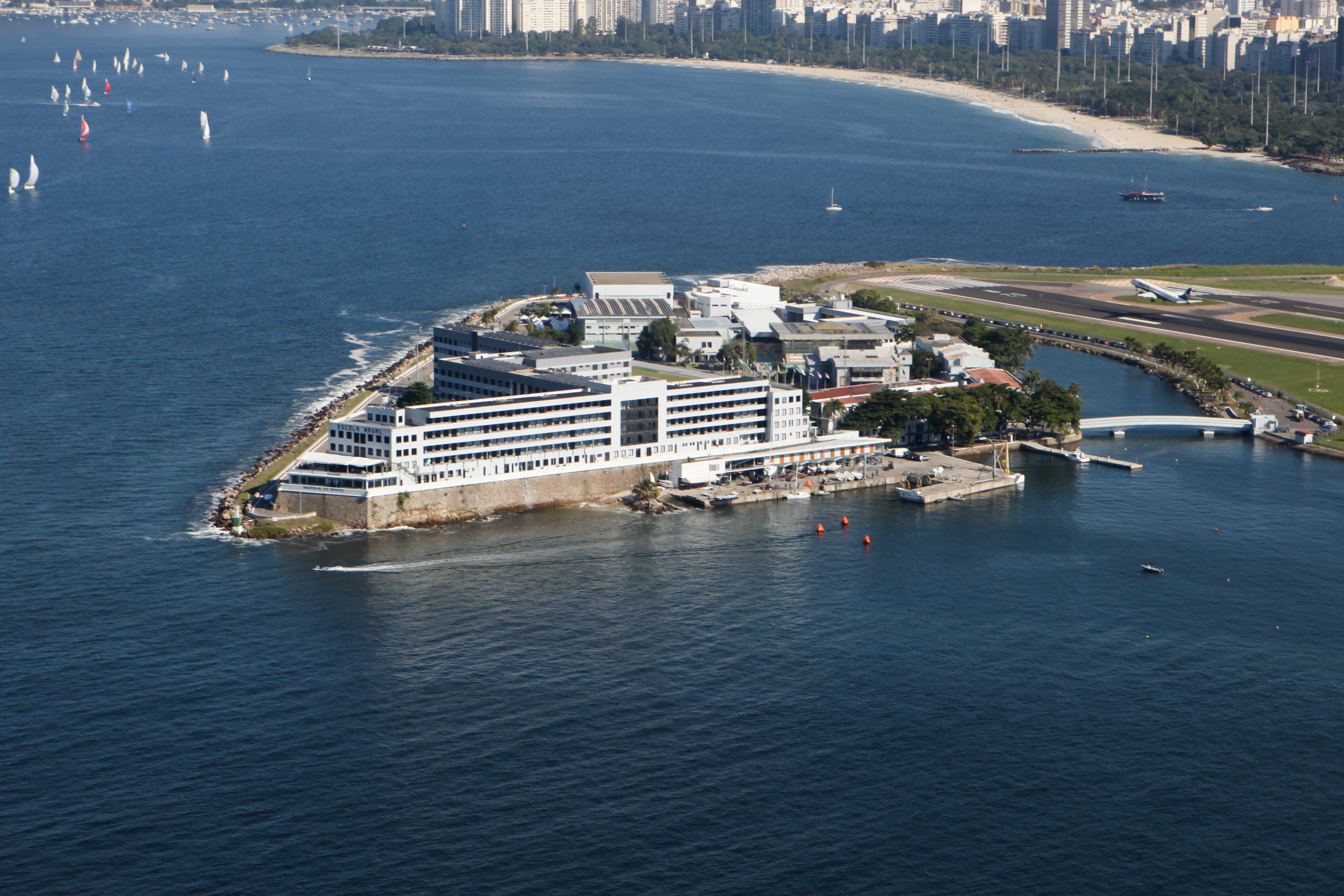
An aerial view of the Naval School in 2015. During the March 1938 uprising, rebels planned to kidnap Vargas, who was supposed to have lunch at the school.

Late in 1937, a conspiracy began against the Estado Novo. It involved many intertwined persons and groups: Washington Luís's former Foreign Minister, Otávio Mangabeira; a participant in the Constitutionalist Revolution who had turned down the option to lead the 1930 Revolution, general Euclides Figueiredo; the exiled former governor of Rio Grande do Sul, Flores da Cunha; the head of the Army's War Material Division, José Maria Castro Júnior; Integralists such as Belmiro Valverde, the national secretary of the AIB's finances; and Integralist Navy officers. Mangabeira and Figueiredo plotted at the Glória Hotel in Rio; Cunha provided monetary contribution when an agent for the conspiracy visited Argentina and Uruguay for support; Valverde, the Integralists' finance secretary, was appointed by Salgado as head of the Integralists in Rio, and the physician also joined the conspiracy; Júnior took leadership of the military aspect of the movement; Salgado kept ties with the hotel's conspirators; and in early January 1938, commander of the Navy Vítor Pujol and another officer told Valverde, the Council of 40's secretary Barroso, and Integralist Olbiano de Melo that the Navy would march on the Guanabara Palace, seat of the presidency, with or without Integralist support.

Meanwhile, the government had been attacking the AIB even more. Salgado had reorganized the AIB as the Brazilian Cultural Association (Associação Brasileira de Cultura) to accommodate with the 2 December decree, and Integralist symbols, uniform, and rituals quietly disappeared. The organization divided into those who wanted to accommodate and operate under the new regime and those who opposed and wished to overthrow it. The Council of 40 voted in late January 1938 38–2 to not collaborate with Vargas. (Note: Integralists had been repressed on the state level since at least 1935. The governors of both Santa Catarina and Bahia disapproved of the movement. The former banned public marches of the Integralist militia in July 1935, and the latter wrote to Vargas that he would not stand further Integralist activity in 1936, culminating in a police raid on and susbsequent acquittal of leaders (by the National Security Tribunal) in Bahia. Other states, such as Minas Gerais and Alagoas, also moved in an anti-Integralist direction.)

Proactive authorities, however, foiled the plot, scheduled for 10 March 1938. A small group of insurgents attacked the Post Office and Telegraph building, electricity plants, the Mayrink Veiga Radio Station, and the Naval School. The Naval School was the most important part of the plan, which would involve the taking of the installations by Integralist sailors which in turn would lead to the capture of Vargas who would have lunch at the base that day. There was terrible confusion among rebels. Dulles states that "it became complete during the following days when messages for starting and stopping the 'rebellion' were issued in rapid succession."

== Uprising (May 1938) ==
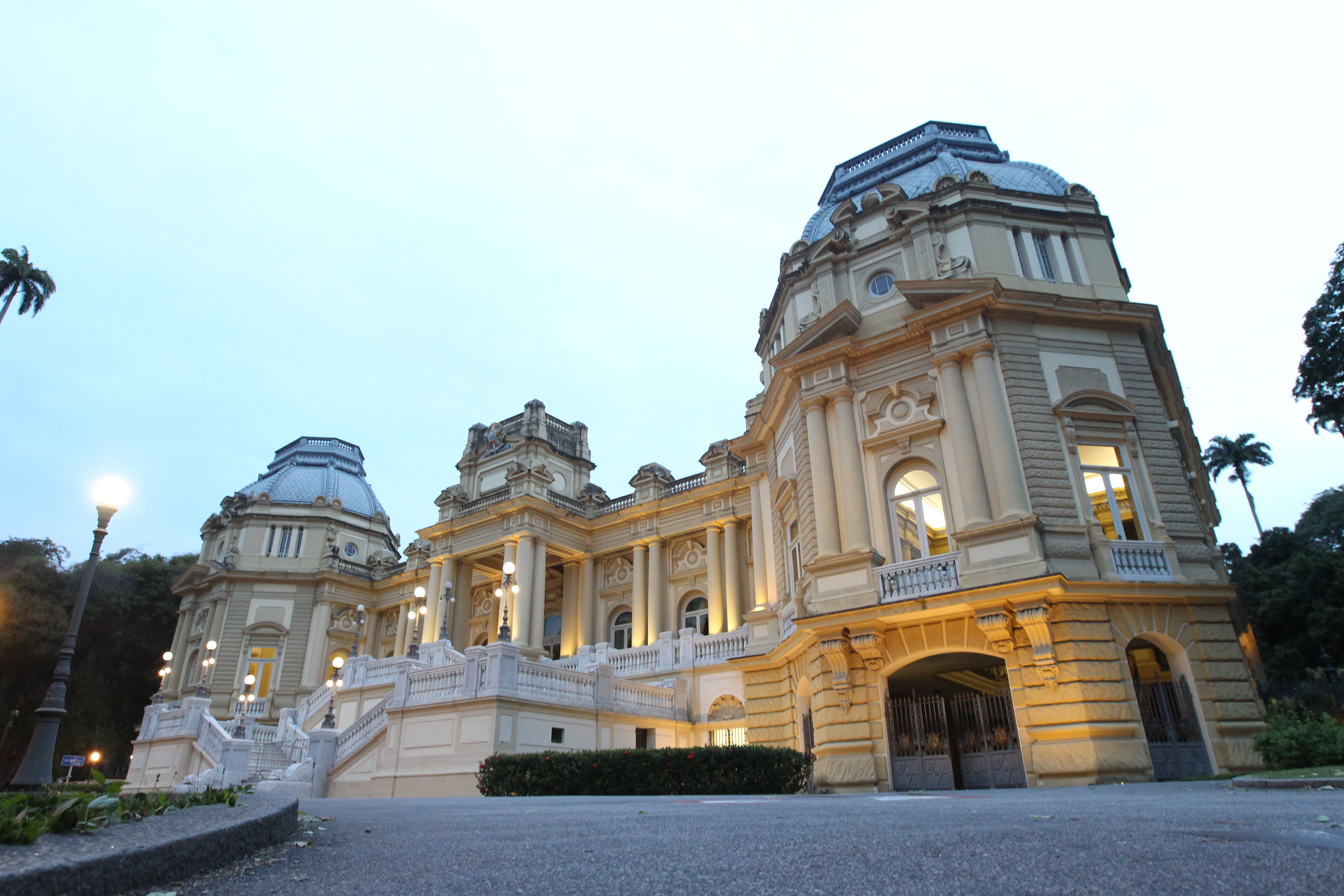
The Guanabara Palace in 2017. Integralists engaged in a shootout with Vargas and his daughter Alzira at the Palace, where Vargas was sleeping.

On the night of 10 May, two months after the first coup attempt, a mobilization began to try to arrest Getúlio Vargas and take over the government. The action was facilitated because it had some government infiltrators, such as "the Guard of the Guanabara Palace, commanded by Integralist Lieutenant Júlio do Nascimento; the head of the Guard in the Civil Police, in charge of lieutenant Soter, and also several service officers in the Navy and in the Army".

The uprising was scheduled for early at dawn. However, according to Belmiro Valverde's later testimony, “the coup was already a failure. Before we started the action, we were already sure of its failure. Many of the people who conspired failed in the clutch. Compromised officers did not show up at their combat posts”. Indeed, only the assault on the Guanabara Palace, the taking of the Ministry of Navy building and the arrest of general Canrobert Pereira da Costa were successful.

The expected transportation did not materialize and the insurgents only had two trucks to transport their troops. At the palace, out of the 150 who had volunteered to participate in the insurrection, only 30 were present in the confrontation with the guard and some relatives of Vargas at the outer gardens. According to Alzira Vargas, who was present at the palace and took part in the events, some police and military authorities hesitated to help the besieged, raising the suspicion that they were colluding with the integralists.

The rebels also failed to imprison officers such as Eurico Gaspar Dutra, Góis Monteiro, Francisco Campos, Cristóvão Barcelos and others. General Dutra received a request for help from the palace and managed to leave his residence, where he was supposed to be imprisoned. Dutra led a small military contingent coming from the Leme Fort and dispersed the insurgents at the palace. The imprisonment of the Minister of Justice, Francisco Campos, did not happen as the rebel group that was supposed to detain him withdrew from the action. The organizer of the assaults, Hermes Malta Lins de Albuquerque, tasked with attacking general Góis Monteiro's house, failed his mission because Góis Monteiro communicated with the police and military authorities, remaining inside his apartment until reinforcements came to free him. General Canrobert Pereira da Costa, head of the War Minister's cabinet, was forced into a car and was later abandoned on a deserted road along with a prisoner, who managed to arrive later at the War Ministry.

The uprising was quickly suppressed by the authorities, as many of those who had volunteered to it were not present when it began. General Newton Cavalcanti resigned on the eve of the rebellion and later congratulated Vargas on the coup's failure. As a result, around 1,500 Integralists and opposers of Vargas were arrested and Plínio Salgado, leader of the Brazilian Integralist Action, went into exile in Portugal in 1939, from where he tried to reorganize the Integralist movement. The government immediately responded by issuing Decree-Law No. 428 on May 16, which transformed the jury trials of the National Security Tribunal, created by Vargas in 1936, into summary rites with deadlines and witnesses reduced to a minimum. Two days later Vargas issued Decree-Law No. 431, which provided for crimes against the State and instituted the death penalty, the latter had been demanded by the press since the day after the uprising.
