= Brazilian coup d'état =

Brazilian coup d'état may refer to:

- Night of Agony
- 1832 Brazilian coup d'état attempt
- Declaration of majority of Pedro II
- Proclamation of the Republic (Brazil)
- Vaccine Revolt
- Copacabana Fort revolt
- São Paulo Revolt of 1924
- Revolution of 1930
- Constitutionalist Revolution
- Brazilian communist uprising
- 1937 Brazilian coup d'état
- Integralist Uprising
- 1945 Brazilian coup d'état
- Preventative Coup of November 11
- Aragarças Revolt
- Brazilian military junta of 1961
- 1964 Brazilian coup d'état
- Brazilian military junta of 1969
- 2022 Brazilian coup plot
- 2023 Brazilian Congress attack
