= Cohen Plan =

1937 Brazilian military forged document

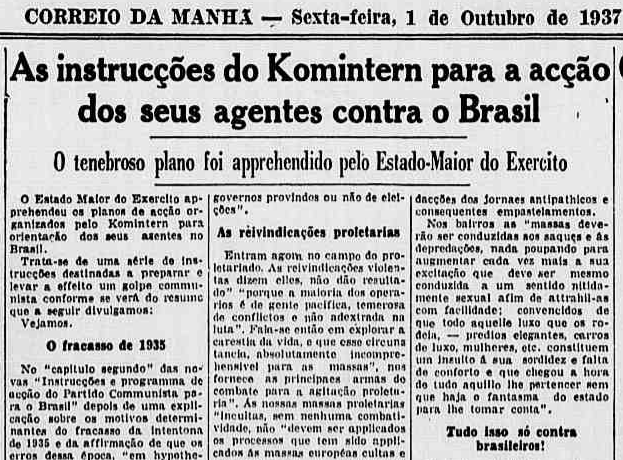
Correio da Manhã issue of 1 October 1937 announcing the "seizing" of the Cohen Plan by the Army's General Staff

The Cohen Plan (Portuguese: Plano Cohen) was a document forged by the Brazilian military with the aim of establishing the Estado Novo dictatorship in November 1937. A conjunction between antisemitism and anti-communism in Brazilian politics, it was fraudulently attributed to the Communist International, which allegedly planned to overthrow the government through strikes, the burning of public buildings and popular demonstrations that would end in looting, chaos, and the murder of authorities. To introduce the fraud, it was "discovered" by the Armed Forces, immediately used to label the political opposition as communists, and then to legitimize the 1937 coup d'état.

With the approach of the presidential elections scheduled for 1938, the absence of a candidate that pleased the government and with the impossibility of extending his term, president Getúlio Vargas and general Eurico Gaspar Dutra began to plan a coup d'état; the coup would only work if it appeared to be a matter of national necessity. The government's military leadership identified the need to "reveal" new facts that would create a climate of insecurity and instability, and thus the idea of creating the Cohen Plan was born. The document was sent by general Pedro Aurélio de Góis Monteiro, chief of the Army's General Staff, to the country's main military authorities and, at an official meeting of military members of the government, it was presented as if it had been seized by the Armed Forces. Dutra and others present expressed their full conviction regarding the imminence of a communist coup and the need for the Armed Forces to act with vigor. The Cohen Plan was then publicized, triggering public commotion and a strong anti-communist campaign. Vargas took advantage of the false threat to pressure the National Congress to declare a state of war, which gave him powers to remove his opponents. On 10 November 1937, forty days after the release of the Cohen Plan, the Estado Novo dictatorship was implemented in the country.

Later, with the Estado Novo crisis in 1945, the same general Góis Monteiro who had helped to architect the 1937 coup started working to overthrow Vargas. He denounced the fraud that had taken place eight years earlier, claiming that the Cohen Plan had been handed over to the Army General Staff by captain Olímpio Mourão Filho, at the time head of the secret service of the Brazilian Integralist Action. Mourão Filho confirmed that he was the author of the document, but claimed to have prepared it as a mere simulation and accused Góis Monteiro of having appropriated and misused it. Góis Monteiro, in turn, claimed to have known about the falsity of the document from the beginning, but disclaimed any blame by suggesting that another member of the government had made it public and claimed that it was true. When asked about his silence during the 1937 coup d'état, Mourão claimed to have respected military discipline.

The revelation of the fraud surrounding the Cohen Plan caused consternation and shame in Brazilian society, which felt cheated. Although the conspiracy and involvement of the highest levels of the Armed Forces were quickly proven, the mutual accusations and third parties, raised by Mourão and, mainly, by Góis Monteiro, made it difficult to clearly establish the share of blame of each involved and what measures were to be taken against them. As part of its legacy, the Cohen Plan played a decisive role in phenomena that extend to the present day, such as the institutionalization of anti-communism as a central part of the identity of the Brazilian military and the establishment, in military cadres, of the idea that a temporary dictatorship could serve as an instrument of progress. By analogy, the conspiracy surrounding the Cohen Plan was equated with events such as the scare campaign launched on the eve of the 1964 coup d'état and continues to be mentioned in analysis of contemporary Brazilian politics.

== Background ==
The Cohen Plan and the conspiracy that involved it have been analyzed in a context of convergence of antisemitic and anti-communist conspiracy theories in the so-called "Jewish-communist myth"; of xenophobia in Brazil in the first decades of the 20th century and its intersection with the demonization of social movements and avant-garde ideological currents; of a tradition of important falsifications in Brazilian political history, involving the participation of the Armed Forces; and of a set of revolts and military coups from the 1920s onwards.

=== The Jewish-Communist conspiracy ===
As part of a set of conspiracy theories based on a Manichean view of reality – including the belief in "diabolical forces bent on doing evil" – and possibly as a reaction to modernity and the anxieties and fears it unleashed, since at least the 19th century, conservative currents began to accuse the Jews of being "instigators of social disturbances and revolutions". Historically, antisemitism had focused primarily on religious and economic issues, and Jews had generally been tolerated for their role as "money agents in a traditional economy". However, the profound transformations brought about by modernity (especially the "urbanization, industrialization, emergence and strengthening of new social groups, liberal and democratizing reforms, changes in behavior, etc.") gave rise to very accentuated tensions, leading conservative segments to face them as negative changes. The Jews, being associated with the main characteristics of modernity, became one of the main targets of the hatred of these reactionary groups.

However, initially the association of Jews with communism was not clearly stated nor was it constant. Documents from the turn of the 20th century, such as the Protocols of the Elders of Zion, blame Jews for fomenting class hatred and for advocating forms of collectivism, but do not clearly associate them with communism. It was in the wake of the traumatic events of the early 20th century, including the Russian revolution of 1917 and the chaos that followed the First World War, that conservative discourse came to emphatically associate communism with the Jews. In parallel with the rise of Nazism and Fascism, and largely because of the action of these groups, these events were followed by an immense antisemitic and anti-Communist wave and the emergence of a myth of the "Jewish-Communist conspiracy" that quickly spread.

United around this conspiracy, and using a process of demonizing the left, Germany, Italy and Japan established the Anti-Comintern Pact in opposition to "democratic and Marxist international ideas [which gave] demonstrations of hatred and discord". Meanwhile, in Brazil, the Brazilian Integralist Action began to imagine that it would finally come to power; Francisco Campos was rapidly drafting a new constitution inspired by the Polish fascist model, and Getúlio Vargas surrounded himself with integralists and admirers of fascism and Nazism. (Note: Brazil maintained good relations with Nazi Germany and many Brazilian military personnel with prominent positions in the high command admired German war doctrines, whose bases merged Prussian tradition and Nazi ideology. In particular, generals Eurico Gaspar Dutra and Pedro Aurélio de Góis Monteiro were fervent sympathizers of Nazism. Famously, Dutra was seen celebrating the Nazi conquest of Paris during the Battle of France, while general Góis Monteiro called the Third Reich a "giant work of national resurrection". Góis Monteiro was even decorated by Adolf Hitler through the German ambassador to Brazil. The Minister of Propaganda, Lourival Fontes, was a well-known disseminator of fascism ideas in the country, and had founded a fascist magazine in Brazil with financial support from the Italian Embassy.)

In response to an alleged threat to "Brazilianness", a strong antisemitic current was strengthened, led by the Brazilian Integralist Action, which, through its multiple books, magazines, newspapers and press pronouncements, spread throughout the country the existence of an "international-Jewish capitalist" plot or a "Jewish-communist alliance of domination" in operation in Brazil.

=== Xenophobia and anti-communism ===
Parallel to the spread of the Jewish-Communist conspiracy myth, in the 1920s and 1930s Brazil underwent structural changes and received a large contingent of immigrants, through whom different avant-garde ideological currents arrived; among them came European workers with an old union experience and a more developed partisan culture, among them communist militants, including some of Jewish origin. Although Brazil already had a long history of fear of popular forces, foreigners were viewed with particular suspicion, especially when they took the lead in social movements; in these cases, they often ended up arrested, tortured, and then deported.

With the rise of Getúlio Vargas to power, through the Revolution of 1930, politics became radicalized and a deeply anti-communist and xenophobic sentiment was definitively installed in the country. In order to stay in power, Vargas forged alliances with the Brazilian military and the integralists, created mechanisms to exalt his own image, and sought to demonstrate that the country was permanently exposed to external forces, especially a "red threat".

Communism was already being portrayed by conservative elites as a "monster" that threatened "the social order and Christian morals of the family", as, incidentally, had also been happening in Europe since the 19th century. Also in Europe, anti-communism had served as a unifying force for all sorts of conservative sectors of society and any political manifestation that disagreed with or threatened the current order was labeled "communist".

However, in the 1930s, anti-communism became institutionalized in Brazil. With the approval of a new National Security Law on 4 April 1935, which provided for crimes with imprecise definitions, in order to allow practically any manifestation that displeased the government to be framed, Vargas began to arrest and torture members of the organized working class and, finally, he closed down the National Liberation Alliance (ANL), whose members, upon being arbitrarily excluded from the political processes, began to plan a revolt under the leadership of the party's communist leader, Luis Carlos Prestes. This revolt, known as the Communist Uprising, quickly failed and its members were punished particularly violently, but it provided a lasting pretext to justify the hardening of the Vargas regime.

Thus, the National Congress passed a series of measures that curtailed its own power, while the Executive Branch gained practically unlimited powers of repression. Media censorship, loss of civil rights, arbitrary arrests, deportations, torture and the murder of opponents multiplied, while society's fear of supposed enemies and the figure of Vargas as "the savior of the homeland" were reinforced. In its final phase, this same process involved the Cohen Plan, an eloquent example of the intersection between Brazilian antisemitism and anti-communism, which functioned as the "finishing of the anti-communist climate": it culminated in the coup on 10 November 1937, which closed the Congress, canceled elections and kept Vargas in power until 1945. Partly because of the farce surrounding the Cohen Plan, the idea of an international communist conspiracy would become "by far the most powerful Brazilian conspiracy theory" of the last hundred years, with ramifications that extend to the present day.

=== Recurring forgeries ===
In addition to its antisemitic and anti-communist roots, the Cohen Plan is also part of a tradition of important falsifications in Brazilian political history, which is an expression of political fanaticism in the country and includes the case of the fake letters attributed to Artur Bernardes in 1922, which almost prevented his election and inauguration, and the so-called Carta Brandi, also false, which threatened the inauguration of João Goulart and Juscelino Kubitschek in 1955. While the first contained offenses falsely attributed to Bernardes with the aim of intensifying the military's opposition to him, and had repercussions in the tenentist revolts that he faced throughout his term, the second consisted of a document forged to make it appear authored by the Argentine deputy Antonio Jesús Brandi, and which supposedly contained articulations between Goulart and the government of Juan Domingo Perón aiming at the outbreak of an armed movement of a syndicalist nature in Brazil. Revealed by Carlos Lacerda a few days before the presidential elections, it was authenticated by the Brazilian military in charge of its investigation, but, in the end, it was proved that it was the work of two professional forgers.

=== Revolts and military coups ===
Finally, the Cohen Plan must be placed in the context of the numerous revolts in the military cadres throughout the 1920s, such as the Copacabana Fort revolt, in 1922, the São Paulo revolt and the Commune of Manaus of 1924 and the Prestes Column, between 1925 and 1927; tenentist revolts that provided reasons for the 1930 revolution: the deposition of Washington Luís, the impediment of the inauguration of the president-elect, Júlio Prestes, and the rise of Getúlio Vargas to power. The Vargas Era would continue to see the emergence of military insurgencies across the country, notably the 1932 Constitutionalist Revolution, the 1935 Communist Uprising, the 1938 Integralist Uprising, and the very coup that deposed Vargas in 1945, while the intentional dissemination of fear of communism as an instrument to sustain coups and manipulate the political game would continue to be constantly present in Brazilian politics, including the coup that resulted from the Cohen Plan, in 1937, but also in the 1964 coup and in numerous other episodes of political life in the 21st century.

== Origins ==
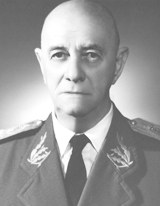
Then captain of the Brazilian Army, Olímpio Mourão Filho was the author of the Cohen Plan.

The document that became known as the "Cohen Plan" was signed with the name Cohen in reference to communist leader Béla Kun, who had ruled Hungary between March and July 1919. Initially, the document was signed "Béla Kun" but it was later changed to "Bela Cohen" as an inside joke, as one of the leaders of Integralist Action used to refer to the Hungarian leader as Bela Cohen. Finally, the document was signed only with the name "Cohen", due to a typing error. In addition to the reference to communism, this name was chosen for its evident Jewish origin, in line with the Nazi-fascist racist ideas that were on the rise.

Experts have highlighted the numerous commonalities between the Cohen Plan and The Protocols of the Elders of Zion, which are known to have been translated and first published in Portuguese by Gustavo Barroso, one of the leaders of the Brazilian Integralist Action. Just as The Protocols of the Elders of Zion are based on a fictional work of literature that was dismembered, modified, and falsely circulated so as to appear to contain minutes of actual Jewish meetings, the Cohen Plan was based on a false document that was only partially released in order to hide its true origins.

As would only be discovered later, the Cohen Plan was prepared by Captain Olímpio Mourão Filho, at the time chief of staff of the Brazilian Integralist Action militia and also of its secret service, but which in the following decades he would rise to the ranks of general in the Brazilian Army and president of the Superior Military Court. In his duties with Brazilian Integralist Action, Mourão was responsible for editing the party's information bulletin; with the approach of the presidential elections that would take place in 1938, Plínio Salgado assigned Mourão the task of writing and including in the bulletin a text that instigated the climate of fear by pointing out that the communist threat was still alive. He believed that the anti-communist sentiment of the population was losing strength, and justified it by saying that the fight against communism was one of the main objectives of the movement. In fact, Salgado sought to bring the government even closer to Integralist values.

Mourão then wrote a document containing a fictitious plan, constructed with ideas taken from unrelated sources, some admittedly false and others not so much, as in the case of an article in the Revue des Deux Mondes about the ephemeral taking of the power by the Hungarian communists led by Béla Kun in the aftermath of World War I. The Captain presented his text to Salgado, but he thought it was too fanciful; even so, the Integralist leader kept the original and left only one copy with Mourão.

In those days, Mourão lived near the building where general Pedro Aurélio de Góis Monteiro, chief of staff of the Army, and, coincidentally, general Álvaro Guilherme Mariante, of whom Mourão was a close friend, lived. During a visit to Mariante, in August 1937, they discussed the communist threat to the country and Mourão remembered the document he had written; he went to his house to get the copy he had kept and then showed it to the general. Mariante became interested in the document and recommended that Mourão hand it over to Góis Monteiro, but the captain refused, saying that this was an integralist matter. Mariante, however, kept Mourão's copy, "in order to read it more carefully", and at some point in the following weeks, the Plan reached general Góis Monteiro through Mariante himself. Access to this document was restricted to the top military leaders involved in the 1937 coup plot, even during the debates that took place in the Brazilian Congress. Eventually, the document disappeared. Mourão Filho stated that he only became aware of its use by the country's military leadership when he read it in the newspapers on September 30.

== Content ==
The masses must be led to looting and depredation, sparing nothing to increase their excitement more and more, which must even be led to a distinctly sexual sense in order to attract them with ease.

— Cohen Plan excerpt

Released on 30 September 1937, the document contained only the second chapter of the complete Cohen Plan, as indicated in the text of the document itself. The first chapter was purposely omitted because it stated that the plan contained in the second chapter was merely hypothetical, that is, it consisted of "a text for debate and not a real plan organized by the Comintern".

In this second chapter, the necessary steps to carry out a rebellion in a large Brazilian city were described. It advocated the use of "useful and complete violence" to pave the way for revolution, and in this sense it was divided into sections that dealt successively with "the technique of the modern strike"; the activities of a "committee on fires"; the action of the civilian masses; of military action; of ammunition; of aviation; and the hostages. In particular, it predicted a general strike, the burning of public buildings, popular demonstrations that would end in looting and depredations, and the arrest and potentially murder of ministers of state, the president of the Supreme Court, the heads of the Senate and the Chamber of Deputies and other major public authorities.

== 1937 coup d'état ==
Following the 1930 revolution, the dictatorship of Getúlio Vargas had mainly relied on the Armed Forces, which, especially from the second half of that decade, acted as government guarantors in exchange for a modernization and armament project. The agreement was clear: Vargas would arm and equip the military and build a national steel complex "in exchange for support to extend his presidency with dictatorial powers that would eliminate politics". In 1937 his government was coming to an end, as presidential elections were expected in January 1938, but the absence of a candidate he liked was a source of growing concern and led to much speculation in his surroundings. While some feared the election of a situationist candidate who would interfere with their interests or, worse still, an opposition candidate, others wanted to promote a well-defined power project, as in the case of those who were close to Italian fascism.

Together with Benedito Valadares and general Eurico Gaspar Dutra, his Minister of War, Vargas concluded that it would not be possible to find a new situationist candidate, legally extend his term or obtain an extension of his term approved by Congress. In this context, the 1937 coup was slowly engineered by Vargas and those around him; but if during the 1930 revolution Vargas had shown hesitation at various times, this time decisive action would be necessary.

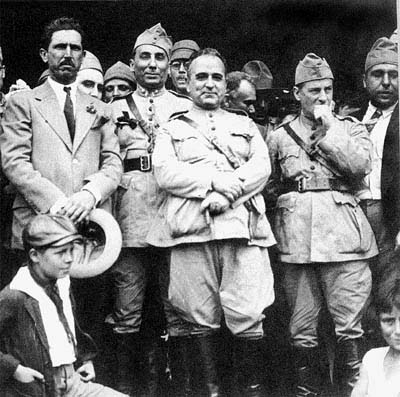
Getúlio Vargas and other leaders of the 1930 Revolution

On 18 September 1937 Vargas contacted general Dutra in order to propose a coup d'état. Dutra had participated in a coup attempt early in his military career, during the Vaccine Revolt, and at that time he was a trusted man of General Góis Monteiro, whom he had replaced as minister by his appointment. The president complained that Congress was useless and opposed to his initiatives, and said the only solution was to change the "regime" and reform the Constitution. Vargas received the support of the Armed Forces to organize a coup, and also sent emissaries to Plínio Salgado, who was promised a ministry and that, in exchange for supporting the coup, the integralists would have a prominent place. in the "new Brazil" that would be inaugurated. However, it was immediately clear to those involved that a pretext had to be found to make the coup d'état appear to be a matter of national necessity rather than personal will. A climate of calamity was needed that would allow Vargas to present himself as the savior of the homeland, as the leader who, faced with threats to peace in the country, would take exceptional measures to defend it.

Although any threat that the Brazilian left could offer had disappeared, that is, after the rapid failure of the 1935 Communist Uprising, there was practically no organized communist movement in the country, the fear of a continuing threat to internal security was being exploited as an important political asset. Because of it, the National Congress had declared a state of war, which had been invariably renewed since April of the previous year and allowed Vargas to govern by decree, that is, without passing through the democratic control of the Legislative Power. However, in June 1937 a majority was formed in Congress against the renewal of the state of war, and this brought an obstacle to Vargas' coup project. The top government then began to design the next phase of their plan, which would consist of "revealing" new facts that would harm public order and introduce a climate of insecurity and political instability. Thus, the idea of making the Cohen Plan was born.

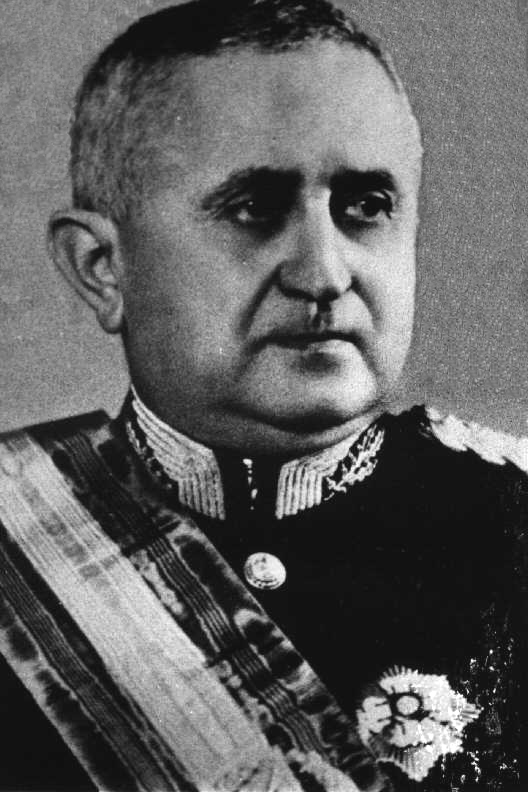
General Eurico Gaspar Dutra was one of the architects of the conspiracy involving the Cohen Plan.

At the end of September 1937, Góis Monteiro informed the Minister of the Navy, admiral Henrique Aristides Guilhem, of the existence of the Plan; to General Dutra; to the head of the Casa Militar, general Francisco José Pinto; and the Federal District's chief of police, Filinto Müller. On the morning of the 27th, Dutra called an emergency meeting in his office, to which generals Góis Monteiro, Almério de Moura, José Antônio Coelho Neto and Newton de Andrade Cavalcanti, and Filinto Müller were called. General Góis Monteiro gave them copies of the Cohen Plan, which was attributed to the Communist International and presented as if it had been seized by the Armed Forces. General Dutra lent credibility to the document and firmly defended the existence of a communist threat and the need to fight it vehemently, even if it meant breaking the law:

It's not the government's fantasy; the documents of communist origin are copious and accurate. [...] Our laws, as we have just seen, are ineffective, innocuous. They have only served to release those the police have caught in the act of delinquency. Against the impending harmful action [communism], honest and saving action of national institutions is imperative.

For his part, general Góis Monteiro stressed that the "communist plans" required a "military movement that amounted to a coup d'état", but that this should be "a secret of generals", that is, it should be kept secret from the public. Müller agreed with the coup, but insisted that the Armed Forces not participate directly in the new government, which should be given carte blanche to carry out summary arrests, without the right to defence, and establish concentration camps for forced labor. General Cavalcanti declared that Góis Monteiro and Dutra should "command the operation, alongside the president, to assure him, through force, of the exceptional powers" that the situation demanded: the declaration of a new state of war and a regime of martial law. Dutra added that these plans would require the involvement of all the country's armed forces, and especially the air forces, and, finally, together with Cavalcanti, he summed up the supposed feeling in the room: "we just want to work for the Army and for the salvation of the Fatherland".

The next day, Dutra and admiral Guilhem, Minister of the Navy, spoke with Vargas and promised him that they would provide a reason that would convince Congress to approve a new state of war. Hours later, Dutra confessed to his fellow generals that this would be the easiest way to get a "legal basis" to arrest deputies and other measures necessary for the coup.

On September 30, the document containing the Cohen Plan – actually only the second chapter of the document originally received by General Góis Monteiro – was read by him in the main official Brazilian radio program, Hora do Brasil, and then it received great attention in the press, being republished in newspapers. Due to the great commotion caused by the publication of the document, the press accepted it as genuine, practically without questioning it, and the candidates for the presidency of the Republic in the upcoming election, José Américo de Almeida and Armando de Sales Oliveira, preferred not to question it and instead focused on assuring everyone that their campaigns did not include communists.

Hoping to take immediate advantage of the situation, the day after Góis Monteiro's radio address, the government hastened to ask the National Congress to approve, for ninety days, the request for a state of war that the same Congress had refused to renew months earlier. In an explanatory statement presented to Congress, ministers Dutra and Guilhem listed their reasons but without presenting any evidence or even a copy of the Cohen Plan, whose discovery they attributed to General Góis Monteiro.

Debates in Congress were dominated by a climate of fear and most parliamentarians, keen to confront the military who had presented the document, preferred not to question its authorship. Opposition parliamentarians wanted to see a copy of the Cohen Plan, but were refused by government deputies who said that asking to see it would be tantamount to questioning the honesty of the military leadership. Among the few who opposed the government's plans were Otávio Mangabeira, Oscar Penteado Stevenson, Aureliano Leite and Prado Kelly; the presidential request was approved in the Chamber of Deputies by 138 votes against 52, and in the Federal Senate by 23 against five. In government, only the civilian ministers José Carlos de Macedo Soares and Odilon Duarte Braga opposed the political use of the Cohen Plan; both would be fired afterwards, and Macedo Soares would be replaced by Francisco Campos.

Once the declaration of a state of war was approved, Vargas immediately intensified the persecution of his political opponents, notably the Rio Grande do Sul governor José Antônio Flores da Cunha, who defended the decentralization of the power of the federal government and was forced to leave the government and go into exile in Uruguay. Strengthened, the Brazilian Integralist Action began to be exhibited throughout the country and, on November 4, it held a huge march in Rio de Janeiro with thousands of uniformed members, which was attended by the president and several of his military ministers.

Shortly afterwards, on 10 November, with the support of several leaders who had participated in the farce of the Cohen Plan, Getúlio authorized the Army to surround and forcibly close the National Congress in Rio de Janeiro. At night, in a radio address to the country, the president announced the imposition of the 1937 Constitution, which Francisco Campos had written under the inspiration of Polish fascist legislation and would become known as "A Polaca". Thus began a new dictatorial period of Vargas, which became known as the Estado Novo and would only end in 1945, with his deposition from the presidency by the same military who had led him there. The new constitution of the Republic eliminated political parties, instituted the death penalty and granted enormous powers to the president, as it institutionalized the state of emergency, which gave the head of the Executive the possibility of suspending the immunity of parliamentarians and authorizing the invasion of homes and the arrest and exile of his political opponents.

Ironically, the Estado Novo was essentially characterized by the crimes denounced in the Cohen Plan: "social control, domination of the press and the senses, violence and repression, despotism and the implementation of a corporatist ideology masked by the idea of a new Brazil". Uneager to share his power, Vargas made the Brazilian Integralist Action illegal, along with all the other political parties, and this would lead its members to organize an attempt at a coup d'état, which foresaw actions similar to those exposed in the Cohen Plan: neutralizing organs or people in high positions and kidnappings; the government would be taken over by a military junta.

== Revelation of the fraud ==
General Pedro Aurélio de Góis Monteiro, one of the conspirators behind the Cohen Plan, was the first one to confirm it was false.

While the Estado Novo lasted, the veracity of the document was never publicly contested by the authorities of the dictatorship, although certain officers of the Armed Forces, such as Eduardo Gomes, are reported to have expressed doubts in this regard. However, with the culmination of the crisis that would bury the Estado Novo, in 1945, the same general Góis Monteiro who had worked for the 1937 coup began to conspire to depose Getúlio. In this context, he was the first to reveal the fraud that had taken place in 1937, confirming that it was staged in order to justify Vargas' stay in the presidency. The general, however, disclaimed all blame and transferred responsibility for writing the document to captain Olímpio Mourão Filho, who at the time had been head of the secret service of Brazilian Integralist Action.

Initially, Góis Monteiro revealed that the document had been handed over to him by a military officer, and not seized from third parties. According to his version, which has been described as "difficult to believe", while Mourão Filho was typing the original of the Cohen Plan at the General Staff, a major named Caiado would have glanced over the document, over Mourão's shoulders, and found that it was a communist plan against the country. Caiado would have told Mourão Filho that it was necessary to hand it over to Góis Monteiro, and this would have been done through general Mariante, but without being told his origin. According to Góis Monteiro, the authenticity of the document was still being investigated when it was made public and, about a year after the 1937 coup, it became clear that the plan had been produced by a member of the Brazilian Integralist Action. In another interview, about a month later, Monteiro detailed that he had known from the beginning that the document was false and that, during investigations into its veracity, the same integralist military had sought him out to inform him that the document had been prepared by the Integralist Action. Later, in an interview published in a book, Góis Monteiro stated that, despite knowing that the document was false, just in case he had sent copies to general Eurico Gaspar Dutra, Filinto Müller and general Francisco José Pinto, suggesting that one of them was that he had stated that it was a true communist plan.

Upon being accused by general Góis Monteiro and later by general Caiado de Castro, captain Olímpio Mourão Filho stated that he had prepared the plan as a simulation to be used by the integralists. According to him, when he learned that his document would be used to legitimize a coup d'état, he sought out General Góis Monteiro, who insulted him and ordered him to shut up. During a procedure in which he sought to defend himself in the Military Justice, he submitted an explanatory document in which he violently accused General Góis Monteiro of making public a document known to be false.

Then, in an interview with Jornal do Brasil, he categorically stated that "the so-called Cohen Plan, which is neither a plan nor a Cohen, was a farce mounted by unscrupulous people to serve a well-defined objective: the 1937 coup" and that "[Góis Monteiro] knew, very well, that this document was apocryphal, but even so, he took advantage of it to get where he wanted, in the greatest counterfeit of our political history in recent years, almost entirely woven on the basis of false documents". According to him, "the anti-communist hysteria of 1937 dragged the nation towards dictatorship". Mourão, who would later become general and president of the Superior Military Court, would also be noted for commanding the troops that marched from Minas Gerais to Rio de Janeiro, triggering the 1964 coup d'état. When asked about his silence in 1937, when he saw his plan used to justify a coup d'état, Mourão Filho claimed that the military hierarchy had prevented him from denouncing his superior's crime.

== Legacy ==
The Cohen plan is considered one of the greatest falsifications in Brazilian history. The revelation of the farce undertaken by the country's top military leaders caused astonishment and shame in Brazilian society, which felt deceived for years on end. Although the conspiracy has been amply proven and the involvement of the highest levels of the Armed Forces is indisputable, the mutual and third-party accusations raised by Mourão and, especially, by Góis Monteiro, made it difficult to clearly establish the share of blame of each one of the military involved. For this reason, the conspiracy involving the Cohen Plan remained a "child of incognito parents" for a long time, intentionally making it impossible for action to be taken against the forgers.

In terms of its long-term legacy, the Cohen Plan was an essential instrument for the institutionalization of anti-communism as a central part of the identity of the Brazilian military, a phenomenon that continues to this day. The communist threat "was posed by the institution as a real danger" that threatened the country and the very existence of the Army as an organization, and Góis Monteiro and Dutra introduced a series of changes in the structure of the Armed Forces in order to get rid of those that did not satisfy their ideological demands. At the same time, general José Pessoa transformed the content of the education provided to the new soldiers, in order to produce a "homogeneous mentality" within the troops and eliminate the diversity of political conceptions. Communism – a notion that, in conservative discourse, was re-signified to include all opponents – came to be presented as a "cancer, malignant disease, which led to any body's death" and, in this line, left-wing soldiers began to be seen as "political monsters" and potential traitors. Not coincidentally, the 27th of November, the date of the Communist Uprising, became important in the military calendar and began to witness "a spectacular rumbling" of anti-communist military and civilian forces. Thus, the adoption of values that deviated from the imposed ideological standard became incompatible with the status of a military professional, and anti-communism was institutionalized in a doctrinal way. The constant repetition of the existence of a lurking threat – for example, through political-military documents produced by the Armed Forces and "permeated with the 'red danger'" – continues to allow the institution to lead the troops to self-police against all kinds of discordant thinking.

Furthermore, the conspiracy around the Cohen Plan helped to cement the idea that a temporary dictatorship could serve as an instrument of economic progress in the military. This idea of a "surgical" military intervention, capable of carrying out an economic nationalism to develop the country, was at the heart of the Armed Forces' action during the 1964 coup (whose dictatorship ended up lasting twenty years) and has remained alive ever since.

Due to its role in using the idea of the "red threat" of communism as an instrument of domination by terror, that is, as a pretext for putting into practice measures that erode the rule of law and that eventually allowed the President of the Republic to execute a self-coup d'état allegedly with the aim of avoiding a dictatorship established by its opponents, the conspiracy around the Cohen Plan has been mentioned as a precursor example of fake news and a false narrative on the part of the top military leaders. By analogy, the conspiracy around the Cohen Plan has been equated with events such as the campaign to scare the population that was launched on the eve of the 1964 coup and continues to be mentioned in analysis of contemporary Brazilian politics.
