= Protógenes Guimarães =

Brazilian admiral and politician (1876–1838)

Protógenes Guimarães GCA
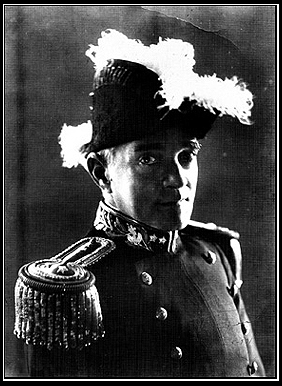
- Protógenes Guimarães, May 1931

Governor of Rio de Janeiro
- In office 12 November 1935 – 9 November 1937
- Preceded by: Newton Cavalcanti
- Succeeded by: Heitor Collet (interim march-july of 1837); Amaral Peixoto

Personal details
- Born: 8 May 1876 Florianópolis, Santa Catarina, Brazil
- Died: 6 January 1938 (aged 61) Niterói, Rio de Janeiro, Brazil
- Citizenship: Brazil
- Spouse: 2
- Children: 10

Military service
- Allegiance: First Brazilian Republic; Second Brazilian Republic
- Branch/service: Brazilian navy
- Years of service: 1891–1935
- Rank: Admiral

Protógenes Pereira Guimarães GCA (Florianópolis, 8 May 1876 — Niterói, 6 January 1838) was a Brazilian admiral and politician who served as Minister of the Navy from 1931 to 1935 and governor of the State of Rio de Janeiro from 1935 to 1937. A prominent figure in the development of Brazilian naval aviation, he was the first director of the Naval Aviation School and was designated patron of Brazilian Naval Aviation in 2014.

== Biography ==
=== Early life and naval career ===
Protógenes Pereira Guimarães was born on 8 May 1876 on the island of Nossa Senhora do Desterro, now Florianópolis, the capital of the state of Santa Catarina. He was the son of José Pereira Guimarães, a Brazilian Navy officer, and Maria Leopoldina Duarte da Silva Guimarães.

On 27 February 1891, he entered the Brazilian Naval School as an aspirant midshipman, beginning his career in the Brazilian Navy. He was appointed a midshipman on 28 November 1895, and was promoted to second lieutenant on 10 December 1897. During this period, he served aboard the cruisers Quinze de Novembro and Benjamin Constant, the battleship Riachuelo, and the torpedo cruiser Timbira. He was subsequently promoted to first lieutenant on 20 December 1899.

In 1900, he served as executive officer aboard the warship Carlos Gomes and subsequently transferred to the passenger vessel Olinda, travelling to Óbidos, in the state of Pará. There, he was appointed executive officer of the cruiser Tiradentes. In May 1901, he became secretary and assistant to the command of the Rio Grande do Sul Flotilla. He returned to Rio de Janeiro in January 1902, where he temporarily served as executive officer of the Naval School before being assigned to the Naval Apprentices' School of Alagoas. He subsequently served in the General Command of Torpedo Boats until September 1903.

Between 1903 and 1905, he served in the National Sailors Corps, before embarking aboard the training ship Benjamin Constant on an instructional voyage to the United States and Europe. Upon his return to Brazil in December 1905, he was appointed commander of the Naval Apprentices' School of Mato Grosso. He was promoted to lieutenant commander on 9 January 1906. In October of that year, he left his command to serve as an assistant in the National Sailors Corps on Villegaignon Island, in Rio de Janeiro. In March 1907, he was appointed assistant to the Second Section of the General Staff of the Navy. Later that year, he travelled to Piauí to select a location and conduct the necessary studies for the establishment of a Naval Apprentices' School in the state. Following the selection of Parnaíba, he was appointed its first commander, remaining in the position until March 1909.

In June 1909, he temporarily served as executive officer of the torpedo cruiser Tamoio. In January 1910, he was once again appointed assistant to the National Sailors Corps, but was dismissed in April and travelled to Toulon, in France, where he took charge of a detachment of Brazilian sailors. From France, he travelled to Mexico to represent Brazil at the celebrations marking the centenary of the Mexican Republic, returning to Rio de Janeiro in October 1910.

On 27 December 1910, by order of the Minister of the Navy, he assumed command of the torpedo boat Silvado, a position he had previously held on an interim basis. In January 1911, he was appointed interim commander of the Naval Battalion. He was promoted to corvette captain, by merit, through a presidential decree of 29 November 1911. In February 1912, he was appointed interim commander of the destroyer Santa Catarina. In November 1913, he left this position to become assistant to the commander of the First Naval Division, which comprised the battleships Minas Gerais and São Paulo, as well as the scout cruisers Rio Grande do Sul and Bahia. After his dismissal in March 1914, he returned to the interim command of the Naval Battalion, where he remained until December 1915.

Between 12 January and 23 August 1916, Guimarães served as Chief of Staff of the Commander of the Navy. On 12 October 1916, shortly after the establishment of the Naval Aviation School on 23 August 1916 under the administration of Minister of the Navy Alexandrino Faria de Alencar, Guimarães commanded an early naval aviation expedition to the Naval School at Angra dos Reis. The aircraft was piloted by an American aviator identified as Hoover, with Guimarães serving as the expedition's commander rather than its pilot.

In December 1917, he was promoted to frigate captain. In February 1918, he left the Naval Aviation School and the War Aircraft Flotilla to become director of the Submarine School and commander of its flotilla, as well as of the support ship Ceará. In September, he was appointed Director of the Aviation Service in Europe, a position he held for over a year. He returned to Rio de Janeiro in February 1920 and enrolled at the Naval War School the following month, graduating in January 1921. Between January and November of that year, he served as harbour master of the state of Bahia. On 27 July 1921, he was promoted to captain of sea and war.

In December 1921, he was appointed commander of the Naval Battalion and, in April 1922, assumed military command of Ilha das Cobras. By decree of 18 November 1922, he was relieved, at his own request, of the command of the Naval Battalion and appointed commander of the Coastal Air Defence of Brazil. He also served as general inspector of the administration of works for the installation of Naval Aviation centres in Rio de Janeiro, Santos and Santa Catarina.

In 1923, Guimarães commanded the War Aircraft Flotilla during the celebrations marking the centenary of the independence of Bahia. During these operations, he led a flight along the Rio de Janeiro–Bahia–Sergipe route, considered the first coordinated military air formation flight in Brazil to follow a predetermined round-trip itinerary. He was also appointed Director-General of Aeronautics of the Navy, a position he held until July 1924.

Between 11 June 1923 and 11 June 1925, he served as president of the Clube Naval.

=== The Protógenes Conspiracy ===
On 5 July 1924, a new wave of the tenentista movement erupted in Brazil, with uprisings in São Paulo, Sergipe and Amazonas. In Rio de Janeiro, Guimarães organised a conspiracy intended to support the São Paulo rebels and provoke an uprising at several locations throughout the then Federal District.

As the leader of the movement within the Brazilian fleet, Guimarães was expected to assume command of the battleship São Paulo on 21 October 1924 and fire an artillery salvo that would signal the beginning of the uprising in Rio de Janeiro. However, the police uncovered the conspiracy and arrested its principal organisers on the night of 20 October, before the planned operation could take place. The attempted uprising subsequently became known as the Protógenes Conspiracy (Conspiração Protógenes).

Among the officers detained alongside Guimarães were Captain Gustavo Cordeiro de Farias and Lieutenant Ari Parreiras. Several civilians were also implicated, including deputies Plínio Casado and João Batista Luzardo, senators Antônio Muniz and Muniz Sodré, lawyer Bento Borges and Azevedo Lima. Other accounts also identify the naval officers José de Britto Figueiredo and Nelson Simas de Souza among the principal figures involved in the conspiracy.

On 4 November 1924, another group of officers, led by Lieutenant Herculino Cascardo, staged a revolt aboard the battleship São Paulo and the torpedo boat Goiás. The latter was captured by government forces, while the battleship sailed south with approximately 600 men, eventually anchoring near Montevideo, where it was handed over to the Uruguayan government and subsequently returned to Brazil. Several of the rebels later joined opposition forces in Rio Grande do Sul.

Guimarães remained imprisoned until January 1927. Following his release, he was indicted by the Supreme Federal Court within a week and arrested again. He was released on 21 May 1927. As a consequence of his participation in the revolutionary movement, he was placed on the retired list by decree of 7 June 1928, with the rank of rear admiral.

=== Director-General of Aeronautics and Minister of the Navy ===
Following the Brazilian Revolution of 1930 and the overthrow of President Washington Luís, Guimarães was granted amnesty in November 1930 and returned to active military service as a rear admiral. By decree of 20 November 1930, he was appointed Director-General of Aeronautics, taking office on 26 November. He remained in this position until June 1931, when he succeeded Vice Admiral Conrado Heck as Minister of the Navy on 9 June.

On 29 September 1932, he was promoted to vice admiral. His administration was particularly significant for the reorganisation and expansion of Brazilian Naval Aviation. Among his initiatives were the establishment of the Naval Aviation Corps and several specialised air units, including the First Observation Flotilla, the First Bombing and Patrol Flotilla, and the First Reconnaissance and Bombing Aircraft Flotilla. He also established the Naval Air Mail service and a meteorological section within the Directorate of Aeronautics.

His administration also introduced several organisational and institutional reforms within the Navy. These included the creation of the Naval Education Directorate, the Merchant Marine Directorate and the Naval Biology Institute, which included laboratories and a hospital specialising in infectious and parasitic diseases. He also established the Order of Naval Merit, a Brazilian decoration intended to recognise distinguished military and civilian service to the Navy, including contributions made by members of foreign navies.

Other initiatives included the construction of the training ship Almirante Saldanha, the development of new buildings for the Ministry of the Navy and the Naval School in Rio de Janeiro, the construction of the Naval Hospital in Nova Friburgo, and the modernisation of the battleships São Paulo and Minas Gerais. He also oversaw the renewal of the Navy's officer corps, the continuation of construction works at the Rio de Janeiro Naval Arsenal, and the creation of the Administrative Naval Tribunal. Additionally, he became involved in the national campaign to designate Ouro Preto a national monument.

During the Constitutionalist Revolution of 1932, the Brazilian Navy remained loyal to the provisional government of Getúlio Vargas. Although representatives of the São Paulo rebels attempted to establish contact with Guimarães, he initially refused to negotiate with their emissary, former federal deputy Carlos Cirilo Júnior, whose credentials he considered insufficient. He nevertheless directed him to Finance Minister Osvaldo Aranha, who explained the government's position on the rebellion.

Guimarães subsequently participated in efforts to end the conflict, maintaining contact with a pacification committee that included former president Venceslau Brás, physician Miguel Couto and Oscar Argolo. In September 1932, he received a letter from rebel leader General Bertoldo Klinger discussing the possibility of ending the hostilities. Guimarães replied that peace could only be achieved under the conditions established by the federal government, namely the surrender of the rebels' weapons and the reorganisation of the São Paulo government under Vargas. An armistice was eventually signed on 2 October 1932, bringing the uprising to an end.

In February 1934, Guimarães participated in political discussions concerning the country's return to constitutional government. He subsequently took part in meetings involving government representatives and political leaders concerning the presidential succession. In July, the new Brazilian Constitution was promulgated and the presidential election was held. Although Guimarães was not a candidate, he received two votes in the election, which was won by Getúlio Vargas.

In October 1934, Guimarães ran for the Federal Chamber of Deputies representing Rio de Janeiro, under the banner of the Partido Popular Radical (PPR). He was elected but relinquished his parliamentary mandate because Vargas refused to accept his resignation as Minister of the Navy. Guimarães remained in the ministry until 12 November 1935.

=== Governorship of Rio de Janeiro ===
In 1935, following the appointment of several federal interventors to govern the states, political groups in Rio de Janeiro began contesting the succession of the incumbent interventor, Ari Parreiras. Guimarães emerged as a candidate supported by the Radical Socialist Coalition, an alliance between the PPR and the Partido Socialista Fluminense (PSF). His main opponent was General Cristóvão Barcelos, supported by the União Progressista Fluminense (UPF).

The election was held indirectly by the state Constituent Assembly, in accordance with the Brazilian Constitution of 1934. On 25 September 1935, Guimarães was initially elected governor, but the result was challenged by the opposition following incidents of violence during the vote, which left a PSF deputy and General Barcelos injured by gunfire. The Electoral Court annulled the result and ordered a new election. In the second vote, held on 12 November 1935, Guimarães was elected governor by a single vote, with the final tally standing at 23 votes against 22.

He took office on 12 November 1935, succeeding Newton Cavalcanti. On 28 March of the same year, he had been awarded the Grand Cross of the Military Order of Aviz by Portugal, in recognition of his standing as a senior Brazilian naval officer.

Upon taking office, Guimarães initially sought to promote political reconciliation in the state through an agreement between the Radical Socialist Coalition and the UPF. However, the arrangement was undermined by disputes between the two political groups, particularly over control of municipal administrations. Opposition to his pacification policy emerged within his own coalition, prompting him to consider resigning. The UPF subsequently presented him with a motion of confidence, which was signed by 21 coalition deputies. In an attempt to resolve the continuing disputes, he established a political commission within the Legislative Assembly, although the initiative proved ineffective. Efforts were also made to establish a new political party to consolidate his support.

In 1937, the campaign surrounding the presidential succession intensified political divisions within Rio de Janeiro. Although Guimarães maintained a position of neutrality, members of the Radical Socialist Coalition who supported him aligned themselves with the opposition presidential candidacy of Armando Sales. His health also deteriorated, resulting in several requests for leave from office.

Following a journey to Europe for medical treatment, the president of the Legislative Assembly, Heitor Collet, temporarily assumed the governorship between March and July 1937. Guimarães returned to Brazil in July, but his condition continued to worsen. Despite being hospitalised, he formally remained governor, as he was reluctant to transfer the office permanently to Collet, whose political faction was viewed unfavourably by Vargas.

On 10 November 1937, the Estado Novo dictatorship was established following a coup led by Getúlio Vargas, dissolving the existing constitutional political order. Amid the new regime and his deteriorating health, Guimarães's governorship came to an end and the state administration was transferred to federal interventor Amaral Peixoto.

=== Personal life and legacy ===
Guimarães was the son of José Pereira Guimarães and Maria Leopoldina Duarte da Silva Guimarães. According to the biographical account of the Brazilian Navy published in partnership with Fundação Getulio Vargas, he was married to Celita Fernandes Carneiro Guimarães and had two children, Maria José Pereira Guimarães and Délio Pereira Guimarães. However, the biographical entry published by CPDOC-FGV additionally records an earlier marriage to Lídia de Melo Matos Guimarães, with whom he had five children. Following her death, he married Celita Fernandes Carneiro Guimarães, with whom he also had five children.

Protógenes Pereira Guimarães died on 6 January 1938 in Niterói, in the state of Rio de Janeiro.

On 11 December 2014, he was officially designated Patron of Brazilian Naval Aviation through Brazilian Navy General Staff Ordinance No. 341/EMA, in recognition of his contribution to the establishment and development of the service.

=== Honours and decorations ===
According to the Brazilian Navy's historical documentation, Guimarães received several military distinctions, including the Grand Officer rank of the Order of Naval Merit, the Silver Military Medal and the Campaign Cross against the German Empire. He was also awarded the Grand Cross of Portugal's Military Order of Aviz.

== Political offices ==
Political offices
Preceded by Conrado Heck	Minister of the Navy of Brazil; 9 June 1931 – 12 November 1935	Succeeded by Henrique Aristides Guilhem
Preceded by Newton Cavalcanti	Governor of the State of Rio de Janeiro; 12 November 1935 – 10 November 1937	Succeeded by: Heitor Collet interim (march-july of 1837); Amaral Peixoto

== See also ==
- Official Gazette of the Union of 28 December 1910 – p. 7
- Official Gazette of the Union of 30 November 1911 – p. 2
- Official Gazette of the Union of 21 November 1922 – p. 6
- Official Gazette of the Union of 8 April 1927 – p. 11
- Official Gazette of the Union of 9 June 1928 – p. 3
- Official Gazette of the Union of 3 October 1932 – p. 5
- Ministries of the Getúlio Vargas administration – Library of the Presidency of the Republic
