= 1937 Brazilian coup d'état =

Military coup led by Getúlio Vargas

- Part of the Vargas Era and the Interwar period
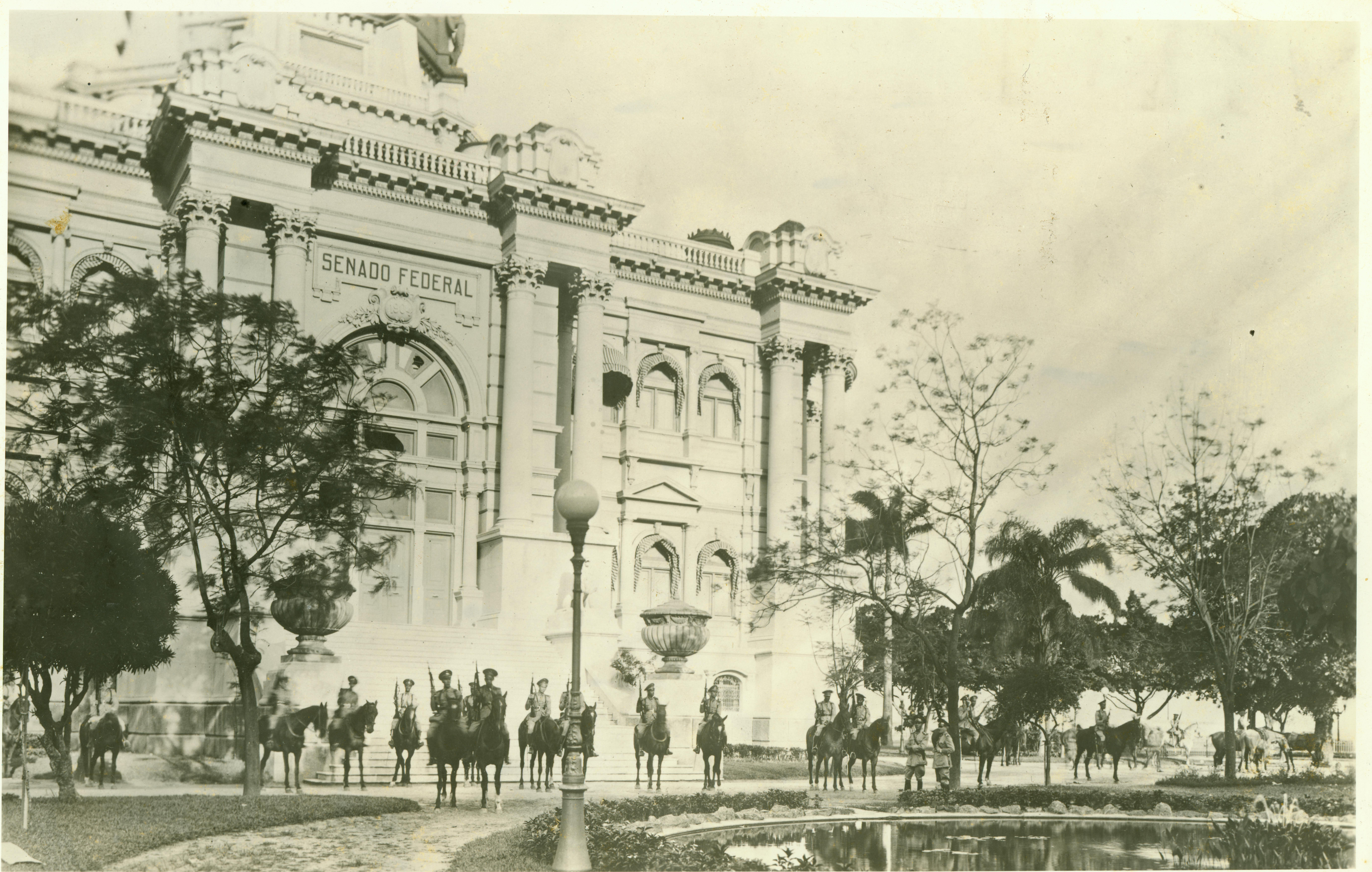
- Troops guard the Palácio Monroe, then-seat of the Federal Senate, on 10 November 1937
- Date: 10 November 1937; 88 years ago
- Location: Rio de Janeiro, Brazil
- Goals: Annul the 1934 Brazilian constitution; Implement the 1937 Brazilian constitution; Extend the presidential term of Getúlio Vargas
- Methods: Military blocks entrance of the National Congress of Brazil; Anti-communist media campaign
- Result: Military/government success: 1934 constitution abridged; 1937 constitution installed; Authoritarian state established in Brazil; Term of Getúlio Vargas extended; Vargas becomes dictator

The 1937 Brazilian coup d'état (Portuguese: Golpe de Estado no Brasil em 1937), also known as the Estado Novo coup, was a self-coup in Brazil led by President Getúlio Vargas with the support of the Armed Forces on 10 November 1937.

Vargas had risen to power in 1930 with the backing of the military, following a revolution that ended a decades-old oligarchy. Vargas ruled as provisional president until the National Constituent Assembly election in 1934. Under a new constitution, Vargas became the constitutional president of Brazil, but following a 1935 communist insurrection, speculation grew over a potential self-coup. Candidates for the 1938 presidential election appeared as early as late 1936. Vargas could not seek re-election, but he and his allies were unwilling to abandon power. Despite loosening political repression after the communist revolt, strong sentiment for a dictatorial government remained, and increasing federal intervention in state governments would pave the way for a coup to take place.

With preparations beginning officially on 18 September 1937, senior military officers used the Cohen Plan, a fraudulent document, to provoke the National Congress into declaring a state of war. After his state's militia was incorporated into the federal forces by a state of war commission in his state, Rio Grande do Sul Governor Flores da Cunha, who was opposed to Vargas, went into exile in mid-October 1937. State governors of Bahia and Pernambuco were also attacked by commissions in their states. Francisco Campos drafted a new, ambitious constitution for Vargas to become a dictator. By November, the President held most of the power in the country, and there was little to stop the plan. On the morning of 10 November 1937, the military surrounded the National Congress. The cabinet expressed approval for the new corporatist constitution, and a radio address by Vargas proclaimed the new regime, the Estado Novo (New State).

In the coup's aftermath, a semi-fascist, authoritarian state, modeled on European fascist countries, was installed in Brazil. Individual liberties and rights were stripped away, Vargas's term of office was prolonged by six years, which turned to eight, and the power of the states evaporated. A plebiscite for the new constitution was promised, but never held. Vargas ruled as dictator until another coup d'état, in 1945, reestablished democracy. Foreign reactions to the 1937 coup were mostly negative. South American countries were hostile to it. Nazi Germany and Fascist Italy supported the coup, but in the United States and the United Kingdom, the overall reaction was unfavorable.

== Background ==
=== Brazil in the early 1930s ===
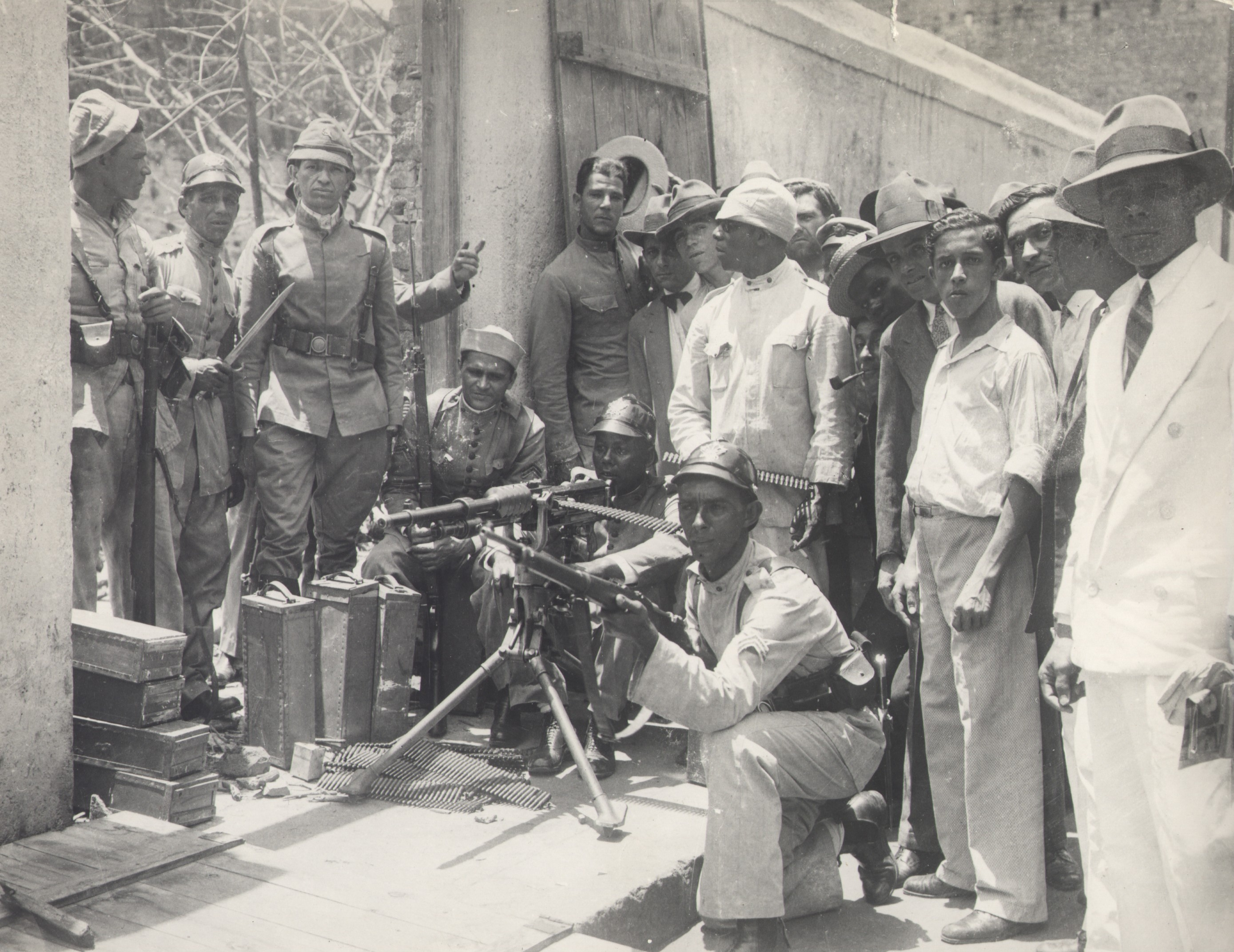
Action in the Revolution of 1930, the event which would bring Getúlio Vargas to power

The First Brazilian Republic ended with the Revolution of 1930. The 1929 economic crisis undermined the power of an oligarchy which had dominated Brazilian politics since the 1890s and concentrated power in the states of São Paulo and Minas Gerais. Under a longstanding informal agreement, politicians from São Paulo and Minas Gerais alternated in the presidency. However, the oligarchy collapsed when President Washington Luís, from São Paulo, nominated another person from his home state, Júlio Prestes, to succeed him. In response, Minas Gerais formed the Liberal Alliance with the states of Rio Grande do Sul and Paraíba to counter the move, nominating Rio Grande do Sul governor Getúlio Vargas for the presidency in the upcoming 1930 general election. Prestes's narrow victory in March, along with the unrelated assassination of Vargas's running mate João Pessoa in July, prompted Vargas and his supporters to initiate an armed revolution in October that year and install a new regime within Brazil.

In the revolution's aftermath, Vargas became provisional president, dissolved the National Congress and other representative bodies, established an emergency regime, replaced almost all the state presidents with "interventors", and assumed all policy-making power. At that time, the military was in support of Vargas. The paulistas, people from São Paulo, instigated a brief civil war between 9 July to 2 October 1932—the Constitutionalist Revolution—but failed to defeat the federal government. Vargas permitted elections in May 1933 to a National Constituent Assembly, which met until 1934. In July of that year, the assembly produced a constitution and elected Vargas to a four-year term as constitutional president ending on 3 May 1938, beginning a quasi-democratic period.

=== Communist insurrection (1935) ===
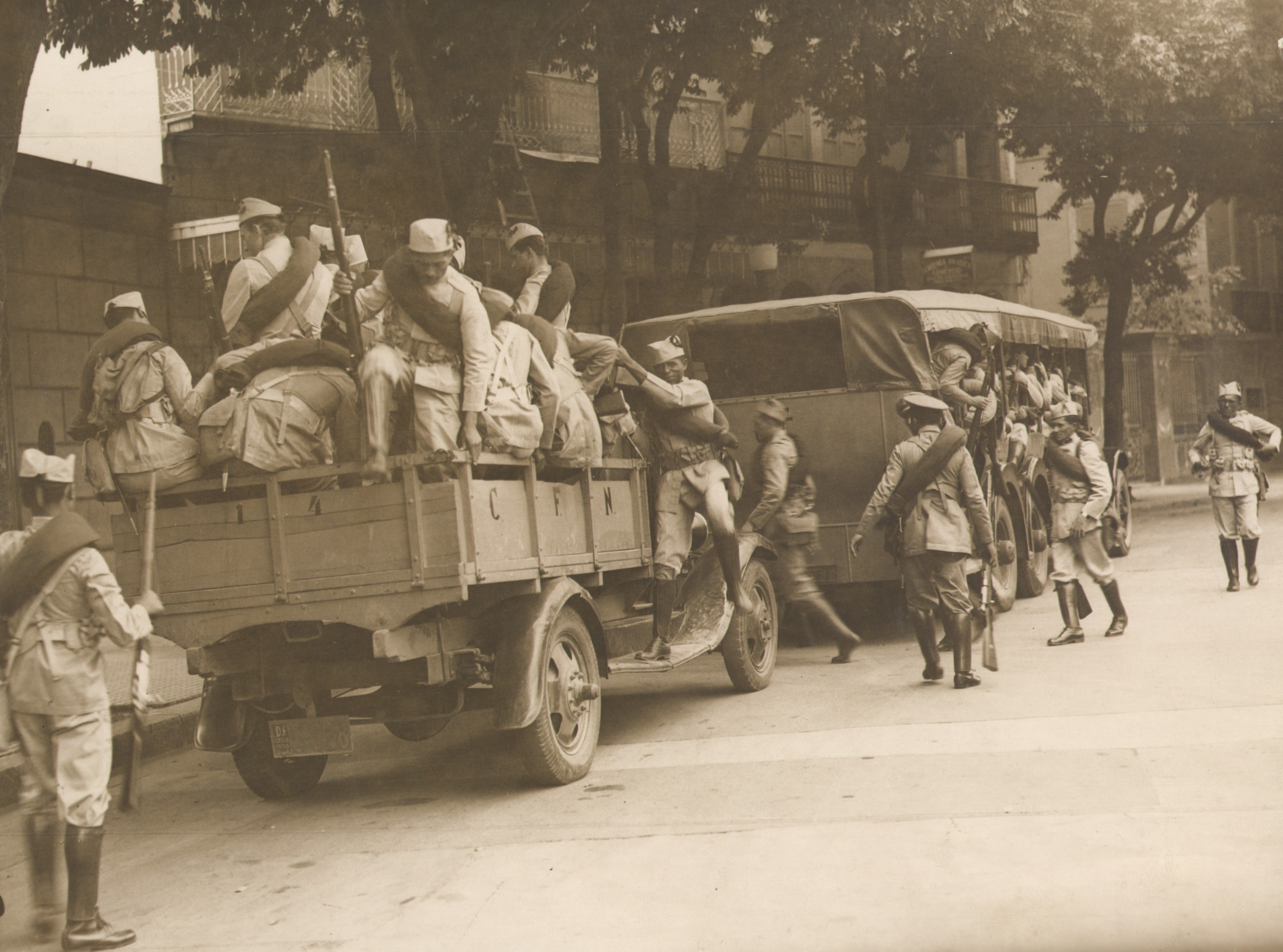
Soldiers disembark to protect the Catete Palace during the 1935 communist revolt, 25 November 1935. The episode began speculation of a self-coup by Vargas.

On 23 November 1935, a Brazilian Communist Party–backed attempted military coup began in Rio Grande do Norte. The movement proceeded in Recife and Rio de Janeiro, where the encounters between troops were especially bloody and several people died. A junta governed Rio Grande do Norte's capital, Natal, for a short period until the uprisings were defeated on 27 November 1935. The aftermath was harsh; historians Boris and Sergio Fausto note that "it opened the way for far-reaching repressive measures and for an escalation of authoritarianism". The executive branch ordered the repression of the Communist Party in particular, and the political left-wing in general, and directed Congress to do the same. Among the resulting new government bodies was the National Commission for the Repression of Communism and the National Security Tribunal [Tribunal de Segurança Nacional] (TSN). (Note: This article uses Portuguese abbreviations. TSN is an abbreviation for Tribunal de Segurança Nacional, or the National Security Tribunal.) The former was created on 24 January 1936, acting independently as an investigatory agency with an effective director who once told Vargas that making one or more unjust arrests was preferable to allowing Brazil to experience another communist insurrection. Congress established the latter in 1936 to investigate the 1935 uprising and judge alleged treason against the Brazilian people, though it became a permanent organization, lasting until 1945.

Police invaded Congress in March 1936 and arrested five assemblymen who were supporters of the National Liberation Alliance, a leftist front. In a vote of 190 to 59, the Chamber of Deputies waived their constitutional immunity. One of them, Abel Chermont, said in May 1937 that sixteen detectives forced him, his wife, and his two children to the police station, that he was beaten by a rubber hose and held prisoner, and that, after resisting, he was brought to the police garage by the throat and beaten senseless by twelve men. The four were held in solitary confinement for the first two months and were even refused fresh-air privileges. A ninety-day state of national emergency was declared by Congress on 18 December 1935, and subsequently extended five times. The 1934 constitution essentially existed only de jure as the states of emergency and police actions violated it, supported by an anti-communist climate. The first speculation that Vargas might be initiating a self-coup, and the revolt's importance, arose in the aftermath of the communist insurrection. Vargas found support from all sides, with Congress passing three constitutional amendments to bolster his power. An extraordinary number of people were jailed, Vargas himself commenting on the situation: "without due process and without proof, hundreds of prisoners who were perhaps innocent". Estimates of the number of arrests vary: Communist journals in Brazil and L'Humanité in France put the number as 20,000 and 17,000, respectively, but historian Robert M. Levine places the number as anywhere between 5,000 and 15,000 arrests. Prisoners faced neglect, exploitation, and severe overcrowding. Luís Carlos Prestes claimed responsibility for the insurrection and was sentenced to seventeen years in prison by the TSN.

=== Speculation and influential factors (1935–1937) ===
From late 1936 to early 1937, three presidential candidates came forward to run for the January 1938 presidential election. The Constitutionalist Party of São Paulo supported Armando de Sales Oliveira; the Vargas government supported José Américo de Almeida; and the Brazilian Integralist Action (AIB) supported Plínio Salgado. (Note: Portuguese abbreviation for Ação Integralista Brasileira or the Brazilian Integralist Action.) Vargas himself could not run again unless he waited four years for the next election. According to historian Richard Bourne, "Although [Oliveira] was objectively an opposition candidate, he began a kind of decorous campaign, speaking to businessmen rather than the public at large and trying to minimize any offence to the Federal Government." A coalition of governors assembled by the governor of Minas Gerais, Benedito Valadares, selected Almeida from Paraíba as the government candidate in May 1937. Salgado entered the race in June, declaring himself to be Jesus's injunction to the electorate. His party was fascist, nationalistic, and church-centered, essentially a hybrid between Catholicism, mysticism, and order and progress, with the ability to appeal to the masses. However, a "free and healthy atmosphere" for elections, declared in the President's 1937 New Year's Address, was facing difficulties. Across the world, war threatened Europe. At home, the states had new difficulties, the military was pressuring for intervention in them, and the far-right was becoming militant.

With the presidential elections, political debates emerged, suppressive measures were lifted, and the minister of justice Macedo Soares ordered 300 prisoners released. Congress refused a request to again prolong the state of emergency declared in 1935. Vargas and his allies were not ready to abandon power. They trusted none of the candidates, and it seemed Brazil was at risk of following the path of Spain—destroyed by civil war. In the military, there was mounting support for "a strong state, dictatorial solution for Brazil's evils". Nazi and fascist states in Europe influenced some officers; others, such as General Newton Cavalcanti, were affected by Integralism. Almeida's increasing shift to the left complicated the situation with his attempts to satisfy a working-class electorate. He did not appear as if he was an official candidate, and at one point he even attacked Vargas, saying, "If Vargas wants to perpetuate himself in power, the nation will fulfill its duty, go to the polls, and vote, even if this be in the face of bullets".

Through 1937, the federal government looked to resolve regional difficulties. Vargas ordered more frequent interventions in the states, including Mato Grosso and Maranhão, the latter of which had its opposition impeach its pro-Vargas governor. The interventor and governor of Rio Grande do Sul, Flores da Cunha, who had been against the President, now found Vargas trying to circumscribe his influence. The President increased the power of the federal military commander in Rio Grande do Sul in an attempt to contest Cunha's armed strength. Vargas also decreed a state of siege in April to attack the governor. The military joined in the effort, making a plethora of accusations against Cunha. Lima Cavalcanti, Pernambuco's governor, whose relationship with the federal government was deteriorating, was also a target. Bahia's Governor Juracy Magalhães tried to form a secretive alliance between various states, though his plan failed. Rumors surfaced that Vargas was preparing to cancel elections, and journalist Maciel Filho described the atmosphere in mid-September, writing: "Getúlio's strength merits a golpe (coup) to end this foolishness. The navy is firm and dictatorial-minded; the army is the same. There are no more constitutional solutions for Brazil."

== Preparation ==
Vargas's need to remove Cunha from power paved the way for the cancellation of elections, and the nullification of the federal system, and led to the planning of a new constitution and what would become the Estado Novo (New State). The coup's organizers decided instead of potentially provoking civil war by operating primarily in the south, they would pursue intercessions in states against Vargas and isolate Cunha's Bahia and Pernambuco allies in preparation for Cunha's removal. With the accession of Pedro Aurélio de Góis Monteiro to Army Chief of Staff in July 1937 and the removal of opposing officers in command, Vargas was under increased military pressure to either act in favor of them or be deposed. The government continually moved in an authoritarian direction despite the President's assurances that he would leave office. According to one military figure, Amaral Peixoto, "The Estado Novo coup would come with Getúlio, without Getúlio, or against Getúlio". (Note: "O Golpe do Estado Novo viria com Getúlio, sem Getúlio, ou contra Getúlio".)

=== September ===
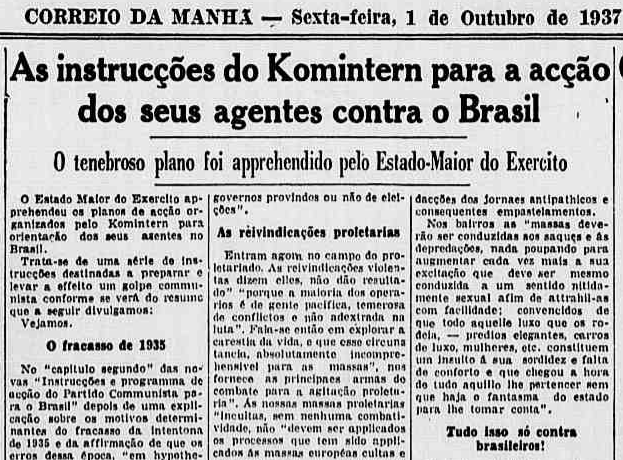
The Cohen Plan announced in Correio da Manhã, 1 October 1937

The official start of the coup's planning was 18 September 1937, though it is believed that by early 1936 Vargas was already trying to extend his tenure by modifying the 1934 constitution. The President's depressed mood in July turned around after a meeting with Monteiro and Filho. Vargas and Minister of War Eurico Gaspar Dutra met, and Vargas explained his intention to launch a coup, hoping for the army's consent. Dutra assured Vargas of his support, but noted he would need to consult the rest of the military. Dutra was able to get aid from General Daltro Filho, commander of the Third Military Region in Rio Grande do Sul. Nine days later (27 September), Dutra convened a meeting of senior army officers, including Monteiro. They established a consensus that the potential for another communist uprising, coupled with the lackluster laws defending the country, warranted the military's support of a presidential coup. One general added the opportunity should also be used to combat the extremism of the right. With advice from Monteiro, Francisco Campos, who admired European fascism and corporatism and was anti-liberal and anti-communist, was working clandestinely on a new, corporative constitution for Vargas.

The problem was that there was no apparent reason for staging a coup. On 28 September, Monteiro asserted the coup rumors were completely groundless. On 30 September, however, Dutra, on the Hora do Brasil radio program, publicly revealed a communist document—the Cohen Plan—detailing a violent revolution with rape, massacres, pillaging, and church burnings, and called for a new state of war. Levine considers the document to have been "a blatant forgery"; the Faustos dub it a "fantasy" or fiction. The document's origins are unclear. Integralist Captain Olímpio Mourão Filho, chief of AIB propaganda, was caught at the Ministry of War creating a plan for a potential communist uprising. Monteiro would get the document via Captain Filho and pass it on to Dutra and others, purportedly seized from communist sources. Years later, the captain explained that since he was a part of the Integralist historical department, he was giving attention to a theoretical communist insurrection. This potential insurrection would then be publicized in an AIB bulletin, describing how the insurrection would go down and how the Integralists would react to it. The version of the Cohen plan publicized in newspapers and on the Hora do Brasil, he added, differed from his initial document. It ended up strengthening the government in preparation for the coup. The plan was also anti-Semitic, for the name Cohen was an obvious Jewish name and a potential variation on the name of Béla Kun, a Jewish-Hungarian communist.

=== October ===
On 1 October 1937, the day after the document's revelation, the petrified Congress convened overnight to declare a state of war and suspend constitutional liberties and rights. Only a few hesitant states and liberals objected to the vote. Vargas and the military paid a visit to the graves of those killed in 1935 by communists, saying "Let this pilgrimage be a lesson and a warning", adding that "the armed forces are on the alert in the country's defense". Governors headed state of war commissions to suppress the opposition in almost every state. Rio Grande do Sul, where Governor Cunha was the target of the commission and Pernambuco, where Governor Cavalcanti was barred from attending the commission's meetings, were notable exceptions. Cunha was nearly impeached, but the opposition's efforts failed by one vote. When the state of war commission demanded the state militia be incorporated into federal forces, the governor had no power to object and this was done on 17 October. Archbishop Dom João Becker transmitted the news to Cunha, who went into exile in Montevideo, Uruguay, on 18 October, leaving a farewell speech to his state. The leadership of the Third Military Region declared the Military Brigade of Rio Grande do Sul federalized. Vargas's brother Benjamin wired the President to notify him things in Rio Grande do Sul were going well. At the same time, Vargas worked closely with Governor Valadares of Minas Gerais.

The military commander in Bahia, another state where the governor did not head the commission, ferociously attacked the governor. In Pernambuco, the governor's mail was censored, editors favorable to him were persecuted, and several of his staff were arrested. At the end of October, Deputy Negrão de Lima paid a visit to the states of the Northeast, to make sure the states' governors supported a coup and to observe their reactions. There was near unanimous consent for it. The anti-communism campaign was at its height: churches spoke openly about the communist threat; university students formed an opposition to the ideology in Curitiba, secondary schools were closed for an investigation into communism in Belém, and spiritist societies, a constant nuisance to the church, were terminated in Rio de Janeiro.

=== November ===
The cover (in Portuguese) of the 1937 constitution. It reads: "New State; Constitution of 10 November 1937; Signed"

On 1 November, there was a parade of the Integralist militia, observed by Vargas and General Cavalcanti. Though Vargas's "counters" found only 17,000 in the parade, Salgado, the Integralist candidate, repeatedly referred to it as the march of the "50,000 Green Shirts". He proclaimed that they were "taking this opportunity to affirm their solidarity with the President of the Republic and the Armed Forces in the fight against Communism and anarchical democracy, and to proclaim the principles of a new regime". Salgado said the fight was also against international capitalism. The speech signaled Salgado's departure from the presidential race, claiming that he desired "not to be President of the Republic, but simply the adviser of my country". Meanwhile, rumors circulated about a forthcoming coup, yet government business continued as usual. Levine says, "It seemed apparent the country was moving to the far right and to fascism." A week before the coup (3 November), there was a commemoration of Vargas's seventh year in power. However, Vargas was absent from the event, conversing with advisors on the price of coffee and allocating the evening to a lengthy discussion with Monteiro instead.

Dutra, Monteiro, and General Cavalcanti all agreed that the new regime would carry on provisionally until a national plebiscite, detailed in the new constitution, was held. Monteiro then made a public declaration that military leaders were not seeking a military dictatorship. In the week leading up to the coup, Vargas and Campos met and discussed the new national constitution Campos had written. A story in the Correio da Manhã (Brazil) was censored; it talked about a conspiracy in the army. The censorship system was turned over to the Federal District police from the civilian justice ministry. On 7 November, the President wrote in his diary that the planned coup, where the Congress would be closed and a new constitution imposed, could not be avoided. Levine says Vargas now held "near-absolute" control of the country. There was clear support from the army, with a three-to-one ratio of generals in favor of amendments to the 1934 constitution. Commanders of the military regions, Rio generals, and the Navy supported the plot. Intrigued after being briefed by Campos, Integralists believed the events would get them into the national government. Campos told them they would become a civic association, the "base of the New State". In reality, they would be betrayed.

The date was set for 15 November, the anniversary of the Proclamation of the Republic. The opposition had mobilized only in early November. Word of Lima's visit had spread in early November, so, to deter the press, Vargas said this was an inquiry into the states' opinions for a substitute presidential candidate. Oliveira sent a manifesto to the military on 8 November, alleged to be disseminated in the barracks, urging them to stop the coup. This was a setback, and though Oliveira and Almeida, the presidential candidates, attacked the plot, coup leaders urgently met with Vargas in the Guanabara Palace, where he was working, on the evening of 9 November to move the date up to 10 November; they could not wait until the fifteenth. There were also communications between Valadares and São Paulo's interventor and Rio Grande do Sul pro-government forces. The moderate minister of justice, Macedo Soares, who had been trying to save democracy, resigned from the cabinet (Note: Soares was fired according to Levine (1998) and resigned according to Bourne. Soares resigned according to Levine (1970).) on 8 November, after falling on the wrong side of the anti-communists; Campos replaced him the next day. With more good news coming from the states, there was now no opposition standing in the way of the President and the coup d'état.

== Execution ==
Vargas announcing the Estado Novo on 10 November 1937. In the white suit is Campos, to the left is Dutra.

Radio address of the formation of the Estado Novo by President Vargas, 10 November 1937
The Estado Novo radio address, 10 November 1937 (in Portuguese)

On the morning of 10 November 1937, cavalry of the Federal District police force surrounded the Congress and blockaded the entrance, preventing congressmen from entering. Dutra was against using the Army in this operation. One visitor trying to get into the Monroe Palace, the former seat of the Senate, was told by a guard, "When a senator cannot enter, then how can a stranger enter?" As the congressmen were the best paid officials in the state, Vargas claimed he saved money by sending them home. The president of the Senate was informed of his body's dismissal. At 10:00 a.m., copies of the new constitution were printed and distributed amongst the cabinet; they were asked to sign it. The sole dissident, Odilón Braga, the minister of agriculture, resigned immediately and was replaced by anti-Oliveira paulista Fernando Costa. Dutra, meanwhile, praised the "lofty mission entrusted to the national armed forces". Many military personnel resigned, notably Colonel Eduardo Gomes. Almost every state retained their pre-coup interventors, notably Minas Gerais, where Valadares was the politician most involved with the coup. Interventors in Rio Grande do Sul, São Paulo, (Note: After assurances there would be no resistance from the state, São Paulo's old intervenor returned after thirteen days.) Rio de Janeiro, Bahia, and Pernambuco, however, were replaced.

In a radio broadcast, Vargas claimed the political climate "remains restricted to the simple processes of electoral seduction", that political parties lacked ideology, that legislative delay prevented the promises made in the April 1934 presidential message, including a penal code and a mining code, and that regional caudilhos (strongmen) had flourished. Instead, he presented a new program of activity, including new roads and railways into the Brazilian hinterland and the implementation of "a great steelworks" that was to provide local minerals and offer employment. He declared that the Estado Novo (New State) would restore Brazil to authority, freedom of action, and be founded on "peace, justice and work". "Let us", Vargas said, "restore the nation...letting it freely construct its history and destiny". According to Vargas, Brazil had been on the edge of a civil war. Campos also held a press conference where he made public the founding of a National Press Council "for perfect co-ordination with the government in control of news and political and doctrinal material". After having initiated the Estado Novo, Vargas left to the Argentine Embassy for a dinner he had accepted before knowing 10 November would be the day of the coup, and was surprisingly calm at the dinner.

Only six opposed it, including the congressional president, Pedro Aleixo, though this count does not include Oliveira's deputies, who were confined incommunicado at their residences. With the knowledge of a potential coup, Congress had spent their last debate arguing on whether there should be a discussion over the establishment of a national Institute of Nutrition. Virtually no protest against the new regime was apparent.

== Aftermath ==
=== A new regime ===
The new government was called the Estado Novo, deriving its name from the Portuguese government headed by António de Oliveira Salazar and installed just four years earlier in 1933. The new corporatist constitution also drew ideas from the constitutions of Italy and Poland, gaining it the nickname "a polaca" by critics in reference to the contemporaneous Polish constitution. According to historian John W. F. Dulles, the 1937 constitution "would have satisfied the most ambitious dictator". The creators of the new regime yearned to change Brazil by tackling what they believed to be its root issues—a populace that believed in the parliamentary system of government, and an absence of discipline, national pride, and leadership. Civil rights were curtailed, individual liberties were nominal, and the proposed Congress never met. Vargas's term was lengthened by six years, and he was now eligible to run for re-election. Oliveira was held in Minas Gerais for six months under house arrest, later being exiled in November 1938 to live in France, New York City, Buenos Aires, and Santiago before returning to Brazil to die in May 1945. The power of states was now nonexistent. Political parties were outlawed on 2 December 1937.

Vargas saw no reason to build support using a political party or an ideological program. Levine labels the new government as authoritarian, writing "Vargas, in spite of his tough caudilho ability to deal with personalities around him, held little talent for totalitarian dictatorship in the strict sense of the word." Lillian E. Fisher describes the new state as "semi-fascist". Historian Jordan M. Young says the new constitution was "molded ... along totalitarian lines" and Brazil now became a dictatorship, and adds, "Brazil was governed from 1937 to 1945 by laws that were issued by the executive office, the government again was one man, Getúlio Vargas." Trends and developments that began during the new era remained a part of Brazilian politics for many years.

Vargas ruled as dictator. After a series of democratic openings toward the end of World War II, however, an increasingly uneasy military worried that Vargas would interrupt democracy again and stay in power via a coup similar to the 1937 one. The President was ousted in a swift move orchestrated by Dutra and Monteiro, men who had prolonged Vargas's time in power in 1937, and Gomes. His rule ended on 29 October 1945, fifteen years in power. After Dutra held power from 1946 to 1951, constitutionally elected, Vargas returned in an election against Gomes. He ruled from 1951 to 1954, troubled by political disunity and economic problems. The military turned against him again after a political crisis emerged, and Vargas killed himself on 24 August 1954. The government was overthrown again in 1964, ushering in a period of military rule.

=== Foreign reaction ===
Brazil's foreign minister Mário de Pimentel Brandão informed United States Ambassador to Brazil Jefferson Caffery of events directly, claiming they were giving him priority over other ambassadors. According to Caffery's description of events, the presidential campaign threatened a crisis; Vargas was unable to reach an agreement with the Bahia and Pernambuco governors for another candidate (in reference to Vargas's cover story for Lima's visit to the Northeast); a plebiscite would be held for the new constitution, replacing the weak 1934 constitution; the government would adhere to a "very liberal policy with respect to foreign capital and foreigners who have legitimate interests in Brazil". He was skeptical of the "effective preservation of democratic institutions under the new constitution". His predictions would prove correct; the plebiscite was never held.

Our relations with President Vargas and with his associates have been so particularly close and friendly during these recent years that I, of course, cannot assume that those relations will be in any way affected by the recent change in government. I should like, of course, to have reassurances on this point.

— US Secretary of State Cordell Hull to US Ambassador to Brazil Jefferson Caffery, 12 November 1937

US Senator William Borah believed that the new regime had every characteristic of fascism. The New York Times affirmed that the new government in Brazil was fascist on 11 November: "The constitutional and dictatorial moves of President Getulio Vargas of Brazil appeared here today, upon the basis of incomplete reports, to have posed the problem of a Fascist government in this hemisphere". The New York Post and the Daily Worker condemned the neutrality of the United States Department of State and of Oswaldo Aranha, the Brazilian ambassador to the United States. Aranha wrote to Vargas that "Communists and American Jews" were at fault for the anti-Brazilian campaign. Aranha took the backlash poorly, but his close friend in Washington, D.C., Sumner Welles, Under Secretary of State, was an ally. On 11 November, Welles told the press the coup was an internal Brazilian matter, not to be judged by the US. Three weeks later, he praised Vargas and criticized those who condemned Brazil as doing so "before the facts were known". Aranha resigned on 13 November. (Note: Vargas denied the resignation on 18 November. Aranha would become minister of foreign affairs in March 1938.)

The Argentine military praised the new regime, but this was contrary to public opinion. Newspapers there attacked the new regime in an attempt to limit any move to the right by the administration of President Agustín Pedro Justo. In Chile, the response was unfavorable. Radio and press in Uruguay, favorable to Cunha, attacked the new regime even harder.

The German Propaganda Minister Joseph Goebbels praised Vargas's political realism and the way he acted at the right moment. The German press and German-language press in the Southern Hemisphere commended the authoritarian government as a triumph against bolshevism. Italian reaction was similar. However, the Germans showed diminished enthusiasm in private, knowing of Vargas's efforts to subdue Nazism in Brazil. European fascists were the only ones expressing supportive opinions. In the United Kingdom, reaction was similar to that of the United States: commentators in both countries warned Brazil was nearing a fascist dictatorship.

== See also ==
- List of coups and coup attempts in Brazil
- Vargas Era
