= Francisco Campos (jurist) =

Brazilian politician (1891–1968)

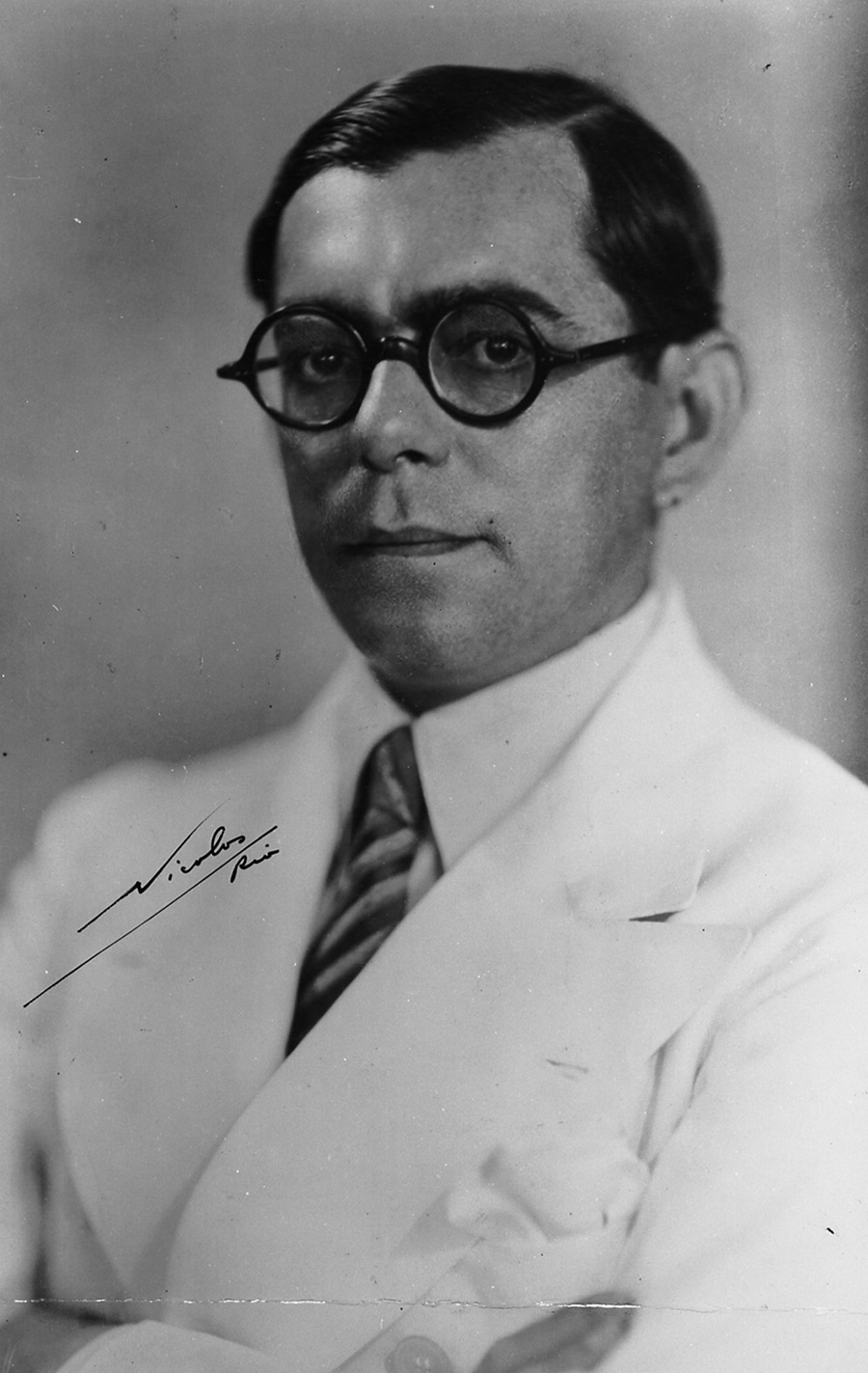

Minister of Education and Public Health
- In office 2 December 1931 – 15 September 1932
- President: Getúlio Vargas
- Preceded by: Belisário Penna (interim)
- Succeeded by: Washington Pires
- In office 6 December 1930 – 31 August 1931
- Preceded by: Office created
- Succeeded by: Belisário Penna (interim)
Other offices held
1921–1926	Federal Deputy for Minas Gerais
1919–1921	State Deputy of Minas Gerais

Personal details
- Born: 18 November 1891 Dores do Indaiá, Minas Gerais, Brazil
- Died: 1 November 1968 (aged 76) Belo Horizonte, Minas Gerais, Brazil
- Education: Free Faculty of Law of Minas Gerais
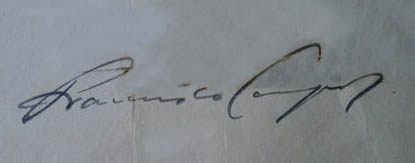
- Signature

Francisco Luiz da Silva Campos (18 November 1891 – 1 November 1968) was a Brazilian jurist, educator, legal scholar, politician, cabinet minister, supporter of Getúlio Vargas, and justice minister under Vargas's authoritarian Estado Novo government. Campos is best known as the author of the 1937 Constitution of Brazil.

== Early life and family ==
The son of magistrate Jacinto Álvares da Silva Campos and Azejúlia de Sousa e Silva, Francisco Luiz da Silva Campos was born on 18 November 1891 in the town of Dores do Indaiá, Minas Gerais. Campos descended from Joaquina do Pompéu on his paternal side. Several prominent figures and families involved in Minas Gerais' politics in the 1930s were part of her lineage.

He was married and had two children.

== Political career ==
=== State deputy (1919–1921) ===
Francisco Campos began his political career in 1919 after being included by Raul Soares, then Minas Gerais' Secretary of the Interior, in the Republican Party of Minas Gerais' (PRM) list of candidates for state deputy for the 1919–1922 legislature. Campos was elected in 1919 with 4,287 votes in the 7th Electoral District. The year before, Artur Bernardes had taken took office as president (governor) of Minas Gerais. Bernardes and Raul Soares introduced changes to Minas Gerais' political landscape, consolidating the hegemony of representatives from the Zona da Mata in the state's politics and dismantled the influence of former state president Francisco Sales within the state apparatus and the PRM, which was the sole political party in the state. As state deputy, Campos played a prominent role in the constitutional reform initiated by Bernardes. Campos also opposed municipal autonomy, as he viewed the municipalities as executive bodies with a purely administrative function, subject to appointment or designation by the state government. In 1920 he declared that "Municipal governments are nothing more than a modality—indeed, the most effective and intelligent one—of central administration's control over local administration".

=== Federal deputy (1921–1926) ===
Campos resigned his position as state deputy after being elected federal deputy for Minas Gerais, taking office in April 1921. As federal deputy, Campos became a staunch critic of liberalism and liberal institutions. In 1921 he declared that "The era of liberty as a natural right, superior to and preceding the organic formation of society, is over. Both right and liberty are merely forms and modalities of social existence, or organs designed for specific social functions. In the modern regime, individual freedoms have come to be guaranteed by the State, and State administration has become a legal administration".

=== Academia ===
Francisco Campos was a professor at his alma mater, where he taught constitutional law, and at the National Faculty of Law in Rio de Janeiro. He was also an education reformer in Minas Gerais, and instigated a major reform of education in the state in 1927.

=== Party politics ===
Campos was a leader in the Liberal Alliance party, which supported Getúlio Vargas for president of Brazil and which ultimately led to the Revolution of 1930.

=== Federal ministries ===
==== Education and public health ====
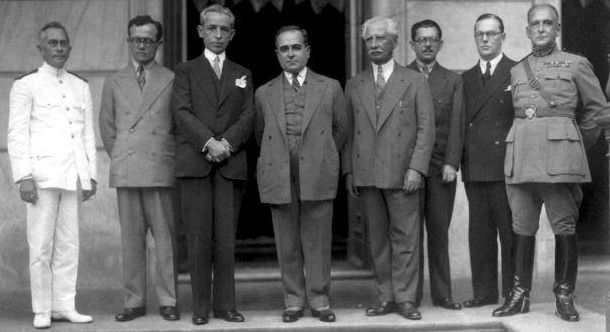
Vargas with his cabinet of the Provisional Government in 1931. Campos is third from right

In the early 1930s, Campos was head of the Ministry of Education and Public Health, as it was known at the time (Brazilian Portuguese: Ministério dos Negócios da Educação e Saúde Pública). In April 1931, Brazil enacted its first federal legislation outlining the characteristics a university should have. This became known later as the Francisco Campos reform, referring to its author, then head of the newly created Ministry of Education and Public Health. He was not the Minister of Education for long, and was succeeded on 16 September 1932 by Washington Pires.

He continued to lead efforts in education reform years after he became Minister of Justice, creating the Faculty of Philosophy, Science, and Letters (Faculdade de Filosofia, Ciência, e Letras).

==== Justice ====
The Vargas regime continued to consolidate power from 1935 to 1937, and Campos became Minister of Justice of the Estado Novo the day before Vargas's self-coup in 1937, which Campos supported.

==== Labor ====
He was also a member of the Brazilian Ministry of Labor and Employment (Ministério do Trabalho, Indústria e Comércio) in December 1937.

== 1937 Constitution ==
Francisco Campos was the author of the 1937 Brazilian Constitution. Unlike the 1934 Constitution which was created by the 1933 National Constituent Assembly, the 1937 Constitution was written by Campos alone, who at the time was Justice Minister under Getúlio Vargas.

=== Objectives ===
The objective was to legitimize Getúlio Vargas's Estado Novo. The earlier, 1934 constitution was designed to provide legitimacy to a government that took control of the country by revolutionary means. But in 1937, another political coup established the Estado Novo, and this new phase of the Vargas Era required a new constitution, which was approved within the year.

=== Fascist aspects ===
Campos's constitutional draft had some very similar features to Benito Mussolini's 1927 Labor Charter (Carta del Lavoro). One similarity was the attempt to control labor unions or other workers' organizations. These were co-opted by Mussolini in Italy and Vargas in Brazil in attempt to block the introduction of any communist or anarchist ideas that might rival the provisions of the fascist model.

=== Popular criticism ===
The 1937 Constitution was pejoratively nicknamed the "Polack Constitution" (polaca) because, like the Polish constitution of 1921, the Brazilian Constitution also did not go through a Constituent Assembly and was granted by the chief Executive, with a text that gave the executive many powers to unilaterally shape the entire composition of the government. This "Polack" nickname reverberated negatively among the population, mainly because it also alluded to the European prostitutes who circulated in the country's capital at the time, as Vargas' biographer Lira Neto wrote:

There could be no doubt about the authoritarian character of the constitutional text drawn up by Francisco Campos. The very way in which the document was drawn up went against the tradition of entrusting such an important task to a Constituent Assembly. For these and other reasons, the new Magna Carta was nicknamed "Polacá", a reference to the Constitution granted and imposed by Marshal Józef Piłsudski on Poland in 1921 (the epithet ended up gaining an even more pejorative connotation, as it alluded to European prostitutes who, despite their true nationality, were treated at the time in Brazil as Poles - or 'Polacas'. (Note: Lira Neto quote: "[N]ão podia haver dúvidas a respeito da vocação autoritária do texto constitucional elaborado por Francisco Campos. A própria forma de elaboração do documento contrariara a tradição de se confiar tão importante tarefa a uma Assembleia Constituinte. Por essas e outras, a nova Carta Magna foi apelidada de 'Polacá, referência à Constituição outorgada e imposta pelo marechal Józef Piludski à Polônia, em 1921 (o epíteto terminou por ganhar conotação ainda mais pejorativa, ao aludir às prostitutas europeias que, a despeito de sua verdadeira nacionalidade, eram tratadas à época, no Brasil, como polonesas – ou 'polacas'.")

— Lira Neto, Getúlio (1930-1945): Do governo provisório à ditadura do Estado Novo (2013)

The new constitution was highly detailed and comprehensive, even more so since Campos was working in a rush. Article II stated that there shall be only one flag, hymn, and motto throughout the country, for instance. Campos would later hold a press conference and publicize the establishment of the National Press Council, created for the intention of "perfect coordination with the government in the control of the news and of political and doctrinal material."

== Political philosophy ==
Campos had a fascination for European fascism. The text of the 1937 Constitution that Campos drafted in support of Vargas' new dictatorial Estado Novo regime was inspired by European fascism, especially Italian and Polish fascism.

Cláudio Lacerda Paiva described the fascist posture of Getúlio Vargas's chief political actors during the Estado Novo, including Campos, writing: "The one who censored was Lourival Fontes, the one who tortured was Filinto Muller, the one who instituted fascism was Francisco Campos, the one who carried out the coup was Dutra and the one who supported Hitler was Góis Monteiro". (Note: Lacerda Paiva quote: "[Q]uem censurava era Lourival Fontes, quem torturava era Filinto Muller, quem instituiu o fascismo foi Francisco Campos, quem deu o golpe foi Dutra e quem apoiava Hitler era Góis Monteiro." See: Rose (2001).)

== Death ==
Francisco Campos died in Belo Horizonte, on 1 November 1968.

== See also ==
- Brazilian integralism
- Constitution of Brazil
- Culture of Brazil
- First Brazilian Republic
- History of Brazil
- History of the Constitution of Brazil
- Judiciary of Brazil
- Military dictatorship in Brazil

== Works cited ==
- Afonso da Silva, Virgílio (2019). The Constitution of Brazil: A Contextual Analysis. Constitutional Systems of the World. Bloomsbury. doi:10.5040/9781509995370. ISBN 978-1-84946-535-9. OCLC 1201425925.
- Bourne, Richard (1974). Getulio Vargas of Brazil, 1883—1954 : sphinx of the pampas. London: C. Knight. ISBN 978-0-85314-195-2. OCLC 3090412.
- Costa Pinto, António; Finchelstein, Federico, eds. (2018). Authoritarianism and Corporatism in Europe and Latin America: Crossing Borders. Routledge Studies in Modern History (illustrated ed.). Routledge. ISBN 1351398849.
- Fernandes, Cláudio. "Constituição de 1937. Estado Novo e a Constituição de 1937" [Constitution of 1937. Estado Novo and the 1937 Constitution]. Brasil Escola.
- Malin, Mauro (2023). "CAMPOS, Francisco". In Joffily, Bernardo; Joffily, Mariana (eds.). Atlas Histórico do Brasil. Fundação Getulio Vargas–CPDOC.
- Horta Duarte, Regina (2016). Activist Biology: The National Museum, Politics, and Nation Building in Brazil. Latin American Landscapes. University of Arizona Press. ISBN 0816534616.
- Neto, Lira (2013). Getúlio (1930-1945): Do governo provisório à ditadura do Estado Novo [Getúlio (1930-1945): From the provisional government to the dictatorship of the Estado Novo] (in Portuguese). Companhia das Letras. ISBN 8580867576.
- Rose, R. S. (2001). Uma das coisas esquecidas: Getúlio Vargas e controle social no Brasil, 1930-1954 [One of the forgotten things: Getúlio Vargas and social control in Brazil, 1930-1954] (in Portuguese). Companhia das Letras. ISBN 8535901949.
- Schwartzman, Simon (2010). Space for Science: The Development of the Scientific Community in Brazil (illustrated ed.). Penn State Press. ISBN 0271041579.
- Siqueira Wiarda, Iêda (2019). "Campos, Francisco Luiz da Silva (1891–1968)". Encyclopedia of Latin American History and Culture – via Encyclopedia.com.
- Skidmore, Thomas E. (2010). Brazil: Five Centuries of Change (2nd ed.). New York: Oxford University Press. ISBN 978-0-19537-455-1.
- Teixeira, Melissa (19 March 2024). A Third Path: Corporatism in Brazil and Portugal. Princeton University Press. ISBN 978-0-691-25815-7.
