= John W. F. Dulles =

American historian (1913–2008)

John Watson Foster Dulles (May 20, 1913 – June 23, 2008) was an American scholar of Brazilian history.

== Biography ==
Born in Auburn, New York, on May 20, 1913, John W.F. Dulles was the son of the former Secretary of State of the United States of America, John Foster Dulles. In 1935 he graduated in philosophy from Princeton University. He received a master's degree in business administration from Harvard University in 1937 and then joined the Bank of New York, where his father was a director.

He worked in a New York mining company where he was sent to Arizona where he received a bachelor's degree in metallurgy from the University of Arizona's School of Mines and Metallurgy in 1943.

In 1959 he moved to Rio de Janeiro, Brazil, to fix an unprofitable Hanna Mining Co. gold mine in the country. The task proved too difficult due to the political turbulence in Brazil at the time, so in 1962 he moved to Texas to become a professor of Latin American studies at the University of Texas.

His first book, published in 1962, Yesterday in Mexico: A Chronicle of the Revolution, 1919–1936, was the result of conversations with the Mexican president Adolfo Ruiz Cortines. Later on he dedicated himself to the study of Brazilian history, starting with the study about former president Getúlio Vargas, entitled Vargas of Brazil: a political biography in 1967.

His works were criticized for having too much description and too little analysis, as well as for not mentioning his and his company's part in the political articulations during the João Goulart government.

He died on June 23, 2008, at North Central Baptist Hospital in San Antonio, Texas. His cause of death was kidney failure.

== Works ==
- Yesterday in Mexico: A Chronicle of the Revolution, 1919–1936 – 1962
- Vargas of Brazil: a political biography – 1967
- Anarchists and communists in Brazil, 1900–1935 – 1973
- Unrest in Brazil: political military crisis, 1955–1964 – 1980
- President Castello Branco: the making of a Brazilian president – 1978
- President Castello Branco: a Brazilian reformer – 1980
- Brazilian communism: repression during world upheaval, 1935–1945 – 1983
- A Faculdade de Direito e a resistência anti-Vargas, 1938–1945 – 1984
- Carlos Lacerda, Brazilian cruzader – 1991
- Castello Branco: o caminho para a presidência – 1979
- Carlos Lacerda, Brazilian cruzader: the years 1960–1977 – 1996
- Sobral Pinto, a consciência do Brasil: a cruzada contra o regime Vargas (1930–1945) – 2001
- Resisting Brazil's military regime: an account of the battles of Sobral Pinto – 2007
