= Filinto Müller =

Brazilian politician (1900–1973)

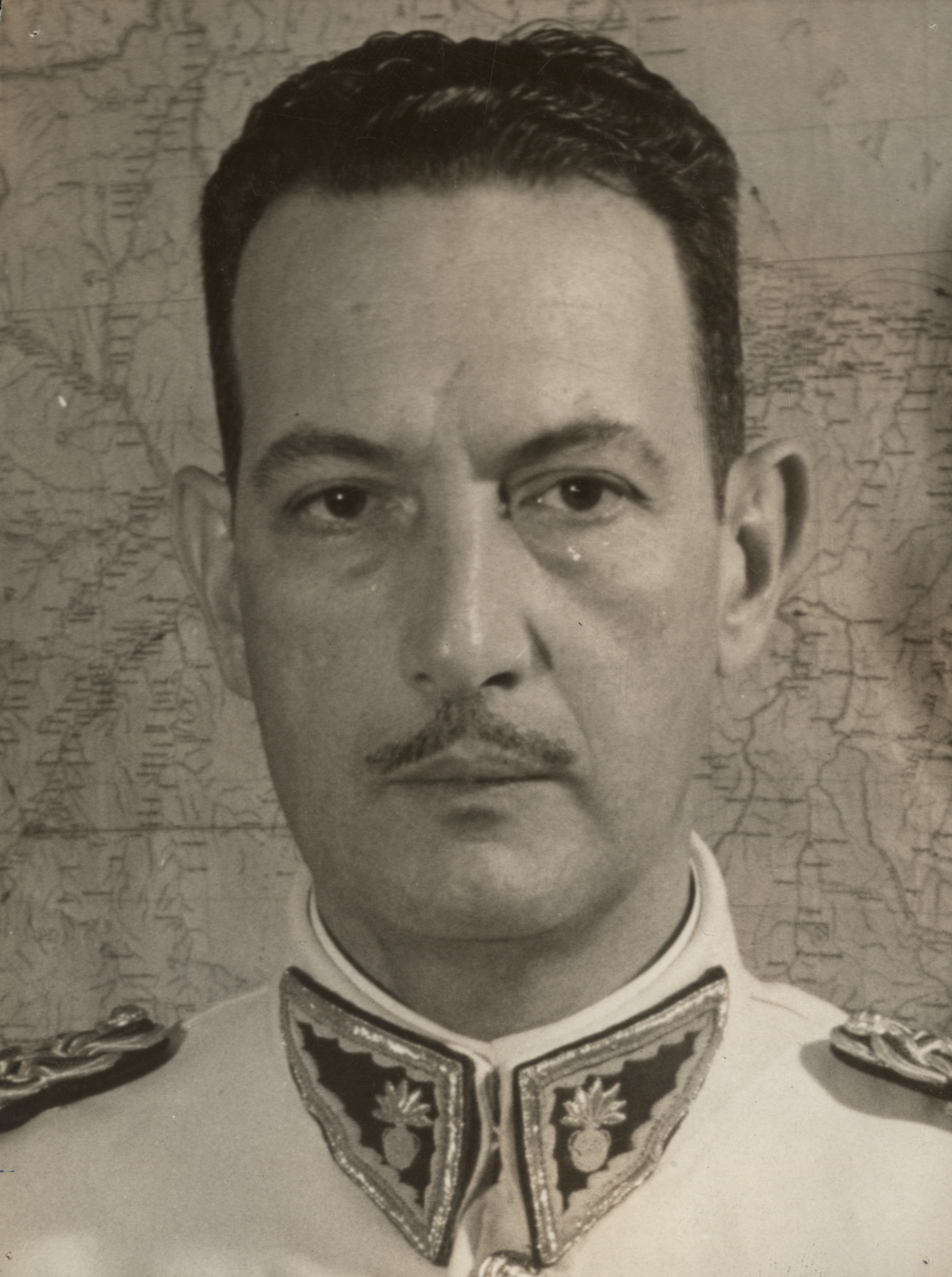
- Müller in 1943

President of the Federal Senate
- In office 29 February 1973 – 11 July 1973
- Preceded by: Petrônio Portela
- Succeeded by: Paulo Torres

Vice President of the Federal Senate
- In office 2 February 1959 – 11 March 1961
- Preceded by: Apolônio Sales
- Succeeded by: Moura Andrade

Senator for Mato Grosso
- In office 3 February 1955 – 11 July 1973
- Preceded by: Vespasiano Martins
- Succeeded by: Italívio Coelho
- In office 18 March 1947 – 15 March 1951
- Preceded by: João Vilas Boas
- Succeeded by: Sílvio Curvo

Personal details
- Born: 11 July 1900 Cuiabá, Mato Grosso, Brazil
- Died: 11 July 1973 (aged 73) Orly, Paris, France
- Party: PSD (1945–1965); ARENA (1965–1973)
- Spouse: Consuelo Lastra (m. 1926)
- Children: 2
- Parents: Júlio Frederico Müller (father); Rita Teófila Correia da Costa (mother)
- Education: Military School of Realengo; Faculty of Law of Niterói

Military service
- Allegiance: Tenentists; Brazil
- Branch/service: Brazilian Army; Military Police of the Federal District
- Years of service: 1919–1946
- Rank: Lieutenant colonel
- Battles/wars: Tenentism; Copacabana Fort Revolt; São Paulo Revolt of 1924; Revolution of 1930; Constitutionalist Revolution
- Offices: Inspector of the Civil Guard of the Federal District; Chief of Police of the Federal District; Staff Officer of the Minister of War

Filinto Strubing Müller (11 July 1900 – 11 July 1973) was a Brazilian politician who served as President of the Senate for the state of Mato Grosso. He was also Chief of Police of the then Federal District during much of the government of Getúlio Vargas. He was killed in the crash of Varig Flight 820 on July 11, 1973, on his 73rd birthday.

== Early career ==
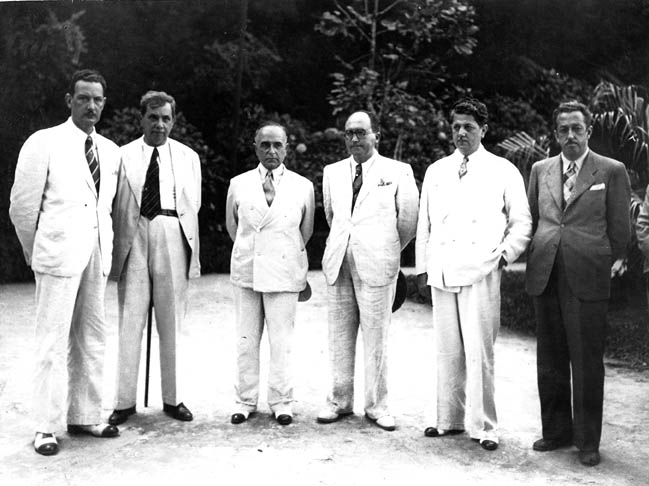
Filinto Müller (far left) with Getúlio Vargas in 1938

Müller joined the Brazilian Army at age 19, eventually becoming an officer who participated in the Tenente revolts. He was a close collaborator of Vargas since his rise to power in the Revolution of 1930, which led to him being installed as the Chief of Police of the original Federal District in Rio de Janeiro. This gave him authority over all civilian police forces in Brazil.

Before and during World War II, he was sympathetic to Nazi Germany, personally encouraging close cooperation between the Gestapo and Brazilian law enforcement. Müller strongly opposed allowing Jewish refugees to enter Brazil prior to WWII and used police resources to monitor the activities of the Jewish Colonisation Association in the country.

Also, he was one of the architects of the Estado Novo, which was characterized by the usage of large-scale torture (it is reported that sometimes he personally participated in torture sessions) and summary executions against political opponents (mostly communists). He was dismissed from his post when Vargas switched sides, moving Brazil to the Allies against Adolf Hitler.

== Senator ==
In 1945, he was one of the founders of the pro-Vargas Social Democracy Party. In 1947 he was elected Senator for the state of Mato Grosso. In 1950, he stood for the post of governor of the same state, but was defeated. He was reelected as senator in 1955 and 1962. In the Senate, he was a supporter of the Kubitschek government. After the military coup of 1964, he joined the pro-regime party ARENA, and soon became its leader. He was reelected Senator in 1970. In 1973, he became President of the Senate.

== Personal life ==
Müller was born in Cuiabá, Brazil in 1900. Müller was married to a Basque woman named Consuelo de la Lastra, and they had two biological daughters: Maria Luiza Müller de Almeida (named after Consuelo's older sister, María Luísa de la Lastra), and Rita Julia Lastra Müller. Together, they adopted de la Lastra's niece, Argentinian-born María Luísa Beatriz del.

== Death ==
Müller died on Varig Flight 820 in France while in office in 1973, on his 73rd birthday. The plane caught on fire, causing it to crash land. All but one of the passengers died of carbon monoxide poisoning from the toxic smoke.

After his death, he was honored as a national hero. Filinto has since been honored publicly by several officials and intellectuals, among them Juscelino Kubitschek and Ulysses Guimarães. On the same flight were his wife, Consuelo, and his grandson, Pedro, who was only sixteen at the time.
