= Newton Cavalcanti =

Brazilian army general (1885–1965)

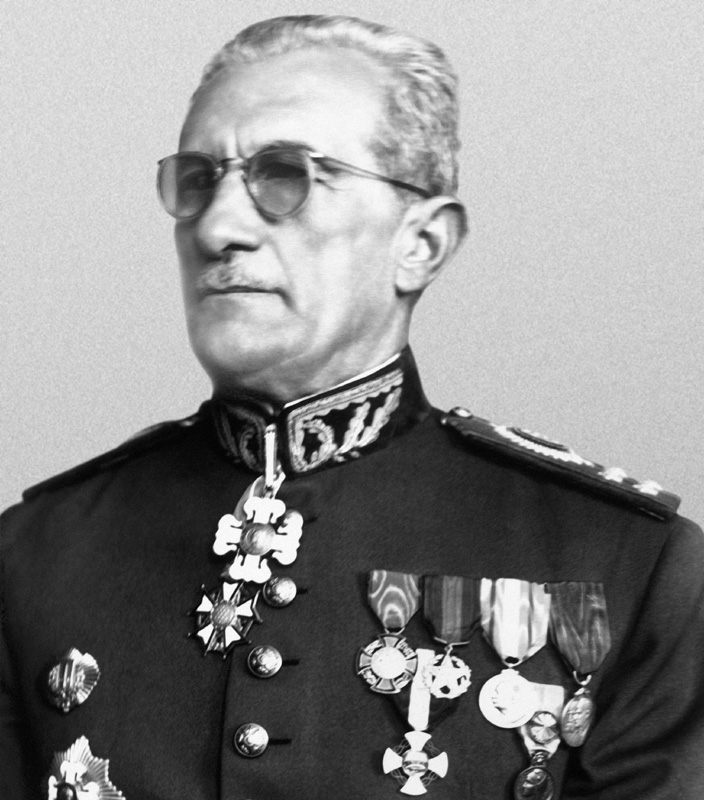
- Born: October 23, 1885; Palmeira dos Índios, Alagoas, Empire of Brazil
- Died: November 25, 1965 (aged 80)
- Education: Escola de Artilharia e Engenharia, now part of the Instituto Militar de Engenharia
- Military career
- Allegiance: Brazil
- Branch: Brazilian Army
- Service years: 1902 - 1965
- Rank: General
- Conflicts: Revolution of 1930

Newton de Andrade Cavalcanti (October 23, 1885 – November 25, 1965) was a Brazilian Army General.

== Biography ==
Born in Palmeira dos Índios, Cavalcanti joined the military in 1902, was commissioned as a second lieutenant in 1911, promoted to captain in 1922, and then to major in 1928. He participated in the Revolution of 1930, leading a unit in support of Getúlio Vargas. Following the triumph of the rebelled forces, Cavalcanti was promoted to colonel and appointed as commander of the 9th Military Region.

From May to July 1935, Cavalcanti served as chief of the Casa Militar da Presidência da República, a body responsible for the president's personal security. The same year, he was appointed federal interventor in the states of Mato Grosso and Rio de Janeiro. An integralist militant, he was part of Vargas's State of Siege Executive Commission, in which he helped carry out repressive measures. Cavalcanti advocated an ''unremitting war to death'' against communism and ordered the shutdown of several masonic lodges. He commanded the Southern Military Command at the time of Vargas' resignation.
