= Editora Revisão =

Anti-Semitic and Holocaust denial literature publisher

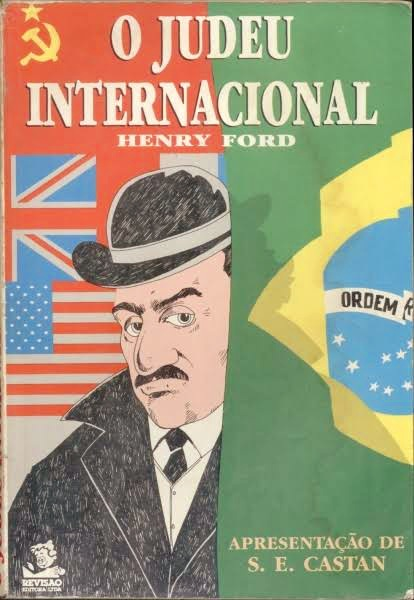
Book

Editora Revisão is a publisher from Rio Grande do Sul specialized in anti-Semitic and Holocaust denial literature, in addition to publishing works on Nazism and integralism, It was founded in 1985 by Siegfried Ellwanger.

In 1986, the Popular Anti-Racism Movement group, formed by the Justice and Human Rights Movement, the Brazilian Black Movement, and the Porto Alegre Jewish Movement, reported to the Coordination of Criminal Prosecutors that the content of the works of Editora Revision, by Siegfried Ellwanger Castan, would be racist. A new complaint was made in 1990, this time with the head of the Police of the State of Rio Grande do Sul, who opened a police investigation, which was sent to the Public Ministry. The complaint was received in 1991, and the search and seizure of copies of several books published by Castan was ordered, among them, Jewish or German Holocaust? Behind the Scenes of the Lie of the Century, by Castan himself, Hitler Guilty or Innocent?, by Sérgio Oliveira and The Protocols of the Elders of Zion, an anonymous work prefaced by Gustavo Barroso. In 1995, Castan was tried and acquitted in the first instance; however, in 1996 he was unanimously condemned by the judges of the 3rd Criminal Chamber of the Court of Justice of the State of Rio Grande do Sul. Despite the conviction, still in 1996, Castan was caught selling his books at the Porto Alegre Book Fair, which led to a new complaint, received in 1998, for which he was sentenced to two years in prison. Castan appealed, arguing that Jews are an ethnicity, not a race, and that therefore anti-Semitism would not be racism. His appeal was denied and the conviction was reiterated by the STF in 2001.

== Books ==
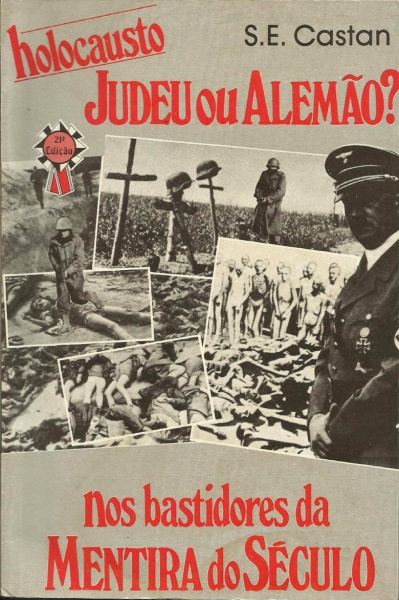
Holocausto Judeu ou Alemão?

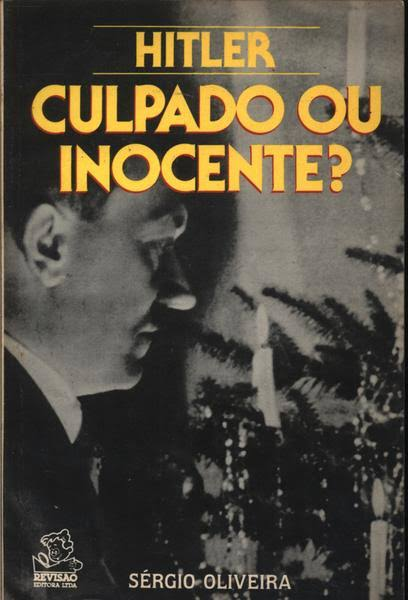
Hitler Culpado ou Inocente?

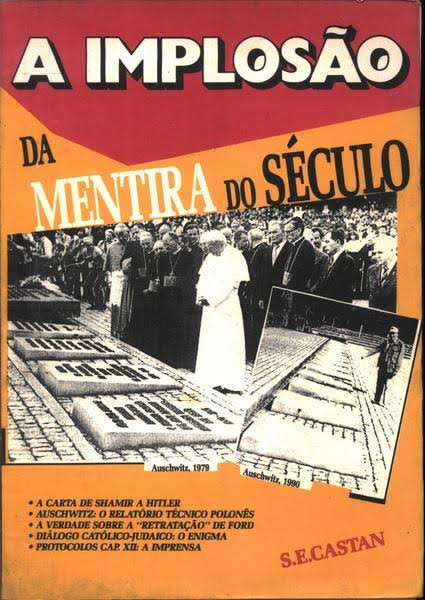
A Implosão da Mentira do Século

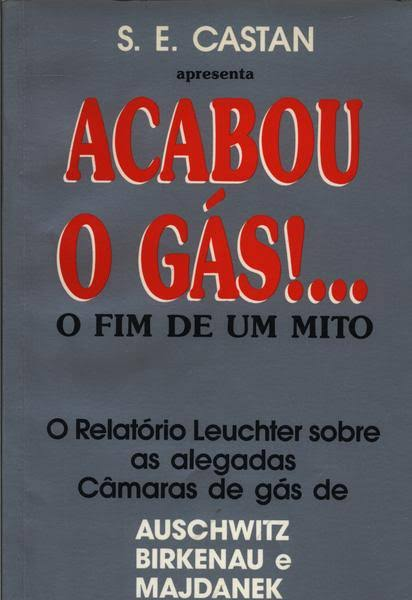
Acabou o Gás

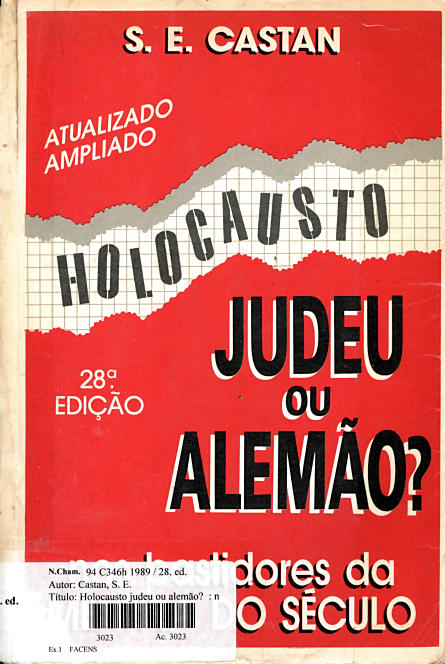
Holocausto Judeu ou Alemão?
- Holocausto judeu ou alemão? - Siegfried Ellwanger
- Carta ao papa - Léon Degrelle
- Brasil sempre - Marcopollo Giordani
- Contraponto - David Duke
- O que é REVISIONISMO? - Eduardo Arroyo
- Não a mordaça - Marcopollo Giordani
- Complô contra a Igreja - Maurice Piney
- Eva Perón a razão da minha vida
- Baú de recuerdos - Galvão de A. Souza
- Eram innocentes - C.W.Porter
- Catolicismo traído - Siegfried Ellwanger
- Holocausto judeu ou alemão? - Siegfried Ellwanger in German
- Holocausto judeu ou alemão? - Siegfried Ellwanger in English
- 11 de setembro - Renê Bourbon
- Getúlio Vargas depõe - Sérgio de Oliveira
- O cachorro história de um espião - Marcopollo Giordani
- Cristianismo em xeque - Sérgio de Oliveira
- Acabou o gás - Siegfried Ellwanger
- A Face Oculta do Sacramento - Sérgio de Oliveira
- O elo secreto - Helio J. de Oliveira
- Os conquistadores do mundo - Louis Marschalko
- Tebas o pequeno campeador - Marcopollo Giordani
- A propaganda de atrocidades é uma propaganda de mentiras - Sérgio de Oliveira
- O livro Branco - edited by the German government in 1941
- Os genocídas do século XX - Sérgio de Oliveira
- Minha Luta - Adolf Hitler
- Alemanha desperta - in German 2nd edition (the first was made by the German government in 1933, accompanies a booklet from the publisher review translation).
- Brasil colônia de banqueiros - Gustavo Barroso
- Murieran realmente seis millones? - Richard Verrall, in Spanish
- A fábula do holocausto - Arthur B. Butz

== Bibliography ==
- CRUZ, Natália dos Reis.Negando a história: a Editora Revisão e o neonazismo. Dissertação de Mestrado em História. Universidade Federal Fluminense, 1997
- Cundari, Paula Casari. Limites da liberdade de expressão: imprensa e judiciário no "Caso Editora Revisão". Tese de Doutorado. PUC-RS, 2006

== See also ==
- Zionology
- Historical Revisionism
