= Olímpio Mourão Filho =

20th-century Brazilian general and Integralist; leader in the 1964 coup

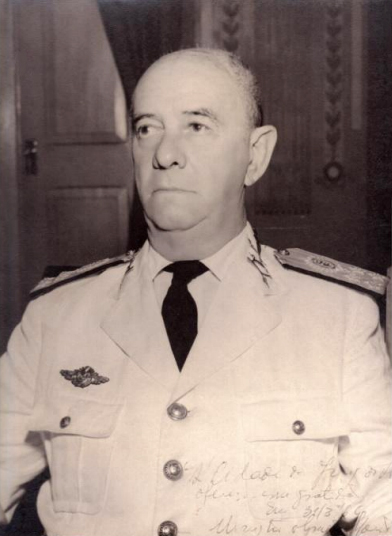
- Mourão in 1964

President of the Superior Military Court
- In office 17 March 1967 – 17 March 1969
- Preceded by: Diogo Borges Fortes
- Succeeded by: Armando Perdigão

Justice of the Superior Military Court
- In office 30 September 1964 – 3 May 1969
- Nominated by: Castelo Branco
- Preceded by: Tristão de Alencar Araripe
- Succeeded by: Álvaro Alves da Silva Braga

Personal details
- Born: 9 May 1900 Diamantina, Minas Gerais, Brazil
- Died: 28 May 1972 (aged 72) Rio de Janeiro, Guanabara, Brazil
- Party: AIB (1932–1937); POT (1945–1951); MDB (1965–1972)
- Spouse(s): Almira Linhares Mourão; Maria Tavares Bastos
- Parent(s): Father: Olímpio Júlio de Oliveira Mourão; Mother: Mariana Correia Rabelo Mourão
- Education: Military School of Realengo; Officers Improvement School; Army General Staff School
- Occupation: Military officer; politician

Military service
- Allegiance: Brazil
- Branch/service: Brazilian Army
- Years of service: 1921–1964 (Note: Pinto 2015, p. 133: Forty-eight years, three months and eight days at service in the Brazilian Army and four years, seven months and nine days [1964–1969] at service in the Judiciary.)
- Rank: Army general
- Commands: List: 15th Hunters Battalion; 19th Infantry Regiment; 11th Infantry Regiment; 11th Recruitment Circumscription; Divisional Infantry of the 4th Infantry Division; Directorate of Social Assistance; 3rd Infantry Division; 2nd Military Region; 4th Military Region/Infantry Division; 4th Army
- Battles/wars: São Paulo Revolt of 1924; Revolution of 1930; Constitutionalist Revolution; World War II; Italian campaign; 1964 Brazilian coup d'état

Olímpio Mourão Filho (9 May 1900 – 28 May 1972) was a Brazilian military officer known as the author of the Cohen Plan, a forged document used to justify the Estado Novo coup in 1937, and, as head of the 4th Military Region/Infantry Division, as the precipitator of the 1964 coup d'état that installed the military dictatorship in Brazil. He reached the rank of army general and ended his career presiding over the Superior Military Court (STM) from 1967 to 1969.

As head of the secret service of the Brazilian Integralist Action (AIB), under orders from Plínio Salgado, he wrote the script for a seizure of power by the communists. In the hands of the government, the text was disclosed and falsely attributed to the Communist International as a real insurrection plan, thus justifying the adoption of dictatorial powers by Getúlio Vargas. Accusations of having served to implement the Estado Novo harmed his career and created lasting distrust among other officers, even though he was acquitted in an Army Justification Council in 1955.

He served in the logistics of the Brazilian Expeditionary Force and worked in telecommunications in the government of Juscelino Kubitschek. After defending the inauguration of João Goulart in the Presidency in 1961, in the following years he considered Goulart a threat to the political system and conspired for his overthrow while serving in Santa Maria, Rio Grande do Sul, São Paulo and Juiz de Fora, Minas Gerais. He claimed to have devised the "greatest conspiracy in the Americas", but his plans were only one part of the conspiracy activity and other conspirators sought to control him. In Minas Gerais, he had as allies his subordinate, general Carlos Luís Guedes, and governor Magalhães Pinto. He carried out Goulart's deposition when, before the date foreseen by the other conspirators, he moved his 4th Infantry Division from Minas Gerais in Operation Popeye, initiating the coup.

His role in the continuation and victory of the coup was minor. In the resulting military dictatorship, he was sidelined from positions of power by the other coup leaders and relegated to the position of justice of the Superior Military Court. During the dictatorship, he criticized the governments of Castelo Branco and Costa e Silva, having an erratic political position, at first a hard-line and later critical of authoritarianism. In 1979, years after his death, the publication of his memoirs by journalist Hélio Silva created great controversy, as they harshly attacked the other military officers.

== Biography ==
=== Personal life ===
The son of Olímpio Júlio de Oliveira Mourão, deputy and state senator, and Mariana Correia Rebelo Mourão, a full teacher at the Normal School of Diamantina, Mourão attended the Diocesan College of the city until he was expelled. He abandoned the study of engineering in Belo Horizonte to enroll in the Military School of Realengo in Rio de Janeiro in April 1918. His father, an important situationist politician in Diamantina, helped Juscelino Kubitschek start his political career in the city.

Mourão had two daughters with Almira Linhares Mourão, who died on 6 July 1955. He later married Maria Tavares Bastos. His daughter Laurita Mourão (born 1926) worked at the Ministry of Foreign Affairs and published several books, including Mourão, o General do Pijama Vermelho (2002) about her father. She says Mourão was misunderstood in 1937 ("he was scapegoated and deceived") and in 1964 ("he was never in favor of closing Congress").

Mourão's pipe-smoking habit was reflected in the name of Operation Popeye.

=== Political and military career ===
==== 1920s and 30s ====
Mourão joined the Brazilian Army on 30 April 1918, at the Military School of Realengo, where he was declared an officer candidate on 18 January 1921. His class was known as the "alfalfa class", and included Castelo Branco, Costa e Silva, Amaury Kruel, Octacílio Terra Ururahy and Macedo Soares. In 1963 he called it a "little course for the mentally feeble" – everyone, including those who failed, passed to the second period to fill positions made vacant by the Spanish flu, and difficult subjects were withdrawn by Congress – he also noted that it produced a number of Ministers of War, interventors and other illustrious people. By his third year he was ranked eighth out of 98 infantry cadets.

He went to serve in the 14th Battalion of Caçadores, in Florianópolis, where he was promoted to second lieutenant on 11 May 1921 and first lieutenant on 31 October 1922. During this period, he fought the rebels who took over São Paulo in the 1924 revolt.

The Army struggled to qualify officers and thus additional military training was necessary for their career progression. In Rio de Janeiro, Mourão attended the Officer Improvement School in 1926 and the General Staff School (EEM) in 1928 and 1930, finishing eighth in his class. He then interned at the General Staff of the 1st Military Region. While attending EEM in Rio de Janeiro, he sided with the Liberal Alliance and the 1930 revolutionaries, participating in the conspiracy that launched the 24 October coup in the capital. The resulting military junta sent Mourão to Minas Gerais to advise the state president Olegário Maciel of the transfer of power to Getúlio Vargas.

He was promoted to captain on 15 August 1931 and to major on 25 December 1937. Until 1936, his performance was praised by his superiors and even by the Minister of War himself. It was probably during this period that he assumed his political side, dormant in 1924; in 1932 he was again on the side of Vargas, fighting the Constitutionalist Revolution since 19 July in the Paraíba Valley. As a reward, until 1936, he was liaison commissioner between the Ministries of War and Transport on the Central do Brasil Railroad. It was a more civilian position that expanded his contacts in society.

=== Integralism ===
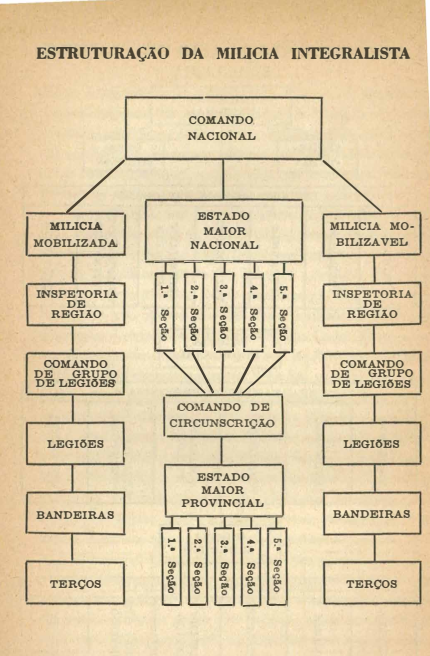
The Integralist militia: Mourão was the head of the General Staff

==== Militancy ====
Motivated less by doctrine and more by feelings against communism, which he saw infiltrating the Army in Santa Catarina, in 1932 Mourão joined the Brazilian Integralist Action. The following year, he promoted the movement in Minas Gerais with Plínio Salgado, Olbiano de Melo and Gustavo Barroso. In 1934, the latter became head of the Brazilian Integralist Action Militia's national department, in which Mourão was chief of staff, organizing it along military lines with his knowledge of the EEM. In Santa Catarina (he returned to the 14th BC as deputy commander, from 1936 to April 1937) he had contact with many Integralists – 39 of the 43 municipalities in the state had an Integralist nucleus. In 1937 he entered the Chamber of the Four Hundred, the advisory body of the national leadership of the AIB.

In his Instrução da Milícia (Instruction of the Militia) he explained the concepts of nation, State, form of government and regime; he dedicated himself to explaining and distinguishing, in fundamental principles, philosophical bases, political bases and economic bases, liberal democracy (liberalism), marxism and integralism. Finally, he discussed the role of the Armed Forces in an Integralist State, stating that they would be the two sides of the triangle on which the State and the Nation rest: Army, Navy, and National Militia. "The triangle is the base of the pyramid, which is the State and whose apex is God".

In Do liberalismo ao Integralismo (From Liberalism to Integralism) he declared that liberal democracy, an "absolutely bankrupt system", should give way to Integral Democracy, and the economic order should be subject to morality and promoter of social justice, features absent in the liberal economy. His thinking at the time also appears in Rumos do Estado Moderno (Directions of the Modern State), published in the magazine A Defesa Nacional (The National Defense): economic or professional suffrage (a dictatorship would be unfeasible) and state intervention in the economy and, to repel communism, in education.

When the AIB was succeeded by the Popular Representation Party (PRP) in the post-war period, Mourão had already left integralism. In order to leave no doubt about his distance from the PRP, he joined the Partido Orientador Trabalhista, a "puny party that existed only in imagination" that elected a councilor in the Federal District and had his mandate revoked. In his memoirs, Mourão referred to integralism as "something that has been overcome". Soon after the 1964 coup, he still had contact with Plínio Salgado, who acted in his favor in Congress.

==== Cohen Plan ====
Head of the AIB's secret service and called from Santa Catarina to the General Staff of the Army in Rio de Janeiro, in August 1937 Plínio Salgado asked Mourão to write "Information Bulletin No. 4" on guerrilla tactics and communist revolutionaries, in order to concentrate the attention of the Integralists on anticommunism and not on the upcoming 1938 presidential election. The resulting text began with a preamble clarifying that it was a material for debate and not an actual plan of the Komintern. Then, based on an article about the seizure of power by the communists in Hungary in 1919, it described how a communist revolution would be carried out in Brazil and the integralist reaction.

Plínio Salgado disapproved of the text, with its "massacres, fires, kidnappings, confiscation of private property, attacks on the clergy, appeal to sexuality", as exaggerated and unrealistic. Mourão was a subordinate of Gustavo Barroso in the militia and Salgado possibly associated the content with Barroso's anti-Semitism, a point of contention between the two. (Note: The plan's most easily anti-Semitic trait would be its title; see Motta, Rodrigo Patto Sá (1998). «O mito da conspiração judaico-comunista». Revista de História (138): 93-105. It was originally signed by "Bela Kun", leader of the Hungarian revolution, but remembering the spelling preferred by Barroso, Mourão scratched "Kun" and wrote "Cohen" (a common Jewish name meaning "priest"). A typist misunderstood and left the signature as just "Cohen".) Disappointed, Mourão took the plan to general Álvaro Guilherme Mariante, justice of the Supreme Military Court, who suggested that he showed it to Góis Monteiro, head of the EME, but Mourão did not want to show it to anyone who was not an integralist. Mariante kept the document for several days before returning it.

While Getúlio Vargas was planning his coup in September, the plan was circulating in high ranking circles and shortly afterwards the newspapers announced the discovery of the plan for an imminent communist coup, which was confirmed by the authorities (especially the EME). The explanatory preamble was not exposed to the public. On 1 October, Vargas requested a state of war. The fake communist plan created acceptance for his coup, carried out on 10 November and followed by the institutionalization of the Estado Novo dictatorship.

The coup was already being prepared long before and would not necessarily need the Cohen Plan to occur. Like other coup leaders, Eurico Gaspar Dutra later dismissed the document as a historical factor. But the Integralists did not deny the plan, creating the impression that they had helped to implement the Estado Novo, and in fact Plínio Salgado had given his support in September. Salgado suspected that the released plan was the one he had requested, but he did not want to demoralize the Army as it was necessary against communism. Mourão, on the other hand, confronted Góis, who told him to keep quiet. As seen below, the Cohen Plan's issue had serious implications for Mourão's career over the next twenty years. After the Estado Novo coup, he left the political scene. Vargas banned the AIB in December 1937, and the Integralist Uprising that broke out in reaction was quelled. Mourão did not participate in the revolt.

=== 1940s and 50s ===
After being promoted to lieutenant colonel on 15 April 1943, Mourão commanded the 15th Battalion of Caçadores, in Curitiba, between 1943 and 1944. He was then Chief of Staff of the Recruitment Board, in Rio de Janeiro. His promotion to lieutenant colonel was based on seniority, as the taint of the Cohen Plan slowed his career progression; his tough personality also weighed heavily. (Note: Pinto 2015, p. 59: "He was a man of harsh words, considered by some to be crazy".) He claimed to be innocent of having worked for Vargas, but was frowned upon in the officialdom.

In 1941, Mourão took a course at the Mechanized Instruction Center in Rio de Janeiro. In articles published in A Defesa Nacional in the 1940s, he participated in the debate on the mechanization of the Brazilian Army. He noted the importance of mechanized forces in World War II and argued that in Brazil they should be distinguished from the cavalry branch, with which they had little in common, in opposition to the line of reasoning that prevailed: mechanized forces as successors to horses. Mourão also had opinions about the qualification and elevation of the sergeants' intellectual level, underway from the 30s and 40s; he was one of the Conservative officers, preferring the sergeant as a ''troop graduate, rough sergeant'', but unable to get involved in politics.

In February 1945, he went to Italy to serve in the Brazilian Expeditionary Force as head of the 3rd Section of the Personnel Depot in Staffoli, a logistical unit for preparing personnel and replacing casualties. In the same year, Góis Monteiro denounced the falsehood of the Cohen Plan and pointed to "an integralist official" as the source, disclaiming, however, all blame; the document would have reached the EME and leaked while investigations into its veracity were ongoing. In 1955 Monteiro directly accused Mourão in the book O general Góis depõe. Wanting to clear his name and become a brigadier general, Mourão contested the case in the Army's Justification Council. Mourão insisted that he wrote the Cohen Plan only for internal use at AIB. Góis was a minister of the STM and much more influential than Mourão, but his reports and those of his witnesses, generals Caiado de Castro and Tinoco, had contradictions; Monteiro ended up retracting his accusation and Mourão was acquitted. Mourão gave an interview to historian Hélio Silva on the subject for his book 1937 – Todos os golpes se parecem, from 1970. His defense at his trial and its context are presented in A Ameaça Vermelha – O Plano Cohen, published in 1980, by the same author. The historian became the general's friend and confidant.

Despite being a General Staff officer and having served in the Brazilian Expeditionary Force, Mourão only reached the rank of colonel on 25 March 1948, once again due to seniority, when his classmates were already colonels. From then on, he already wanted to go to the reserve, but he was convinced to be the first commander of the 19th Infantry Regiment, in São Leopoldo, from 1949 to 1950. As a colonel, he also commanded the 11th Infantry Regiment, in São João del-Rei (1951–1953), and the 11th Recruitment Circumscription, in Belo Horizonte (1953–1955).

When his colleagues reached the generalate in 1953, he remained a colonel. Costa e Silva and Castelo Branco would then reach the rank of major general in 1958 and army general in 1961. Also aiming for the generalship, Mourão aimed to attend the Escola Superior de Guerra (ESG), a novelty in the post-war period and, like the General Staff School, an advantage in promotion. He was prevented from doing so, however, due to his own illness and that of his wife Almira, who died in 1955.

=== Juscelino Kubitschek government ===
In civilian clothes, 1957

Mourão judged that there was no real risk of impeding Juscelino Kubitschek's inauguration, and therefore Lott's countercoup was unnecessary to guarantee it. As he had good relations with the new president, who was also from Diamantina, Mourão was promoted to brigadier general on 25 March 1956, in one of the two vacancies freely chosen by the president. As a general, Mourão commanded the Divisional Infantry of the 4th Infantry Division, in Belo Horizonte, from 1956 to 1957 and headed the Directorate of Social Assistance, in Rio de Janeiro, between 1957 and 1961.

Mourão also gained the leadership of the Radio Technical Commission, subordinated to the Ministry of Transport and Works, a position that was more political than technical, but laborious. He gained contacts like Assis Chateaubriand. It was a powerful body, controlling radio and television concessions and air, naval, and military broadcast ranges. Mourão implemented the prohibition of access to radio and television to oppositionist Carlos Lacerda and presided over the Brazilian delegation at the Radio-Communications Commission in Geneva, Switzerland in 1959, where the standardization of world frequencies was discussed. Mourão wanted the 525/535 Kc/s range for Brazil, allowing for the existence of many low-power municipal radios (10 watts). He considered the power of ~5 kilowatts intended by Assis Chateaubriand and others to concentrate the means of communication in the hands of a few. The lane could interfere with Argentine navigation, but it wouldn't bother thanks to the low power. In this way, Mourão obtained this frequency range for local Brazilian broadcasters. He left the Commission with the end of Juscelino Kubitschek's term. Mourão also did not like the construction of Brasília and evaluated Juscelino's government as "confused and pharaonic".

=== João Goulart's inauguration ===
In 1961 Mourão had another opportunity to attend the ESG but refused, judging the National Security Doctrine as totalitarian, one of the "philosophical stupidities imported from the Pentagon". He was against Cordeiro de Farias, its founder, and other associates like Golbery do Couto e Silva. Mourão distanced himself from the faction of the "modernizing" officers who graduated from the school, thus appearing among the "traditionalists". But while ESG graduates gained political influence and business contacts, Mourão was isolated, operating outside any powerful group. (Note: See CPDOC FGV 2001, GOLPE DE 1964, for a definition of the "modernizing" and "traditionalist" officers.)

Mourão interpreted the fall of Jânio Quadros in August as possibly caused by his Minister of War Odílio Denys, who would establish a dictatorship. Mourão met with marshal Henrique Teixeira Lott, who would publicly declare himself in favor of the inauguration of vice president João Goulart, prevented by Denys on the pretext that Goulart was a communist. Mourão was not satisfied, wanting an armed movement against Denys' veto, but he did not find support, either in Lott, in the Chief of Staff of the 1st Army, Aurélio de Lira Tavares, in the commander of the GUEs in Vila Militar, Ladário Pereira Teles, or the former commander of the 1st Infantry Division, Jair Dantas Ribeiro. General Osvino did not want to accompany Mourão to Rio Grande do Sul, where opposition to Denys was mounting. He also sounded out the commander of the First Army, Nestor Souto de Oliveira. He was unable to proceed with the idea of taking the attitude of the General Staff, First Army and Military Village to Denys.

Despite the failure of his legalist effort, Goulart was sworn in and, to weaken him, the parliamentary system of government was established, the continuation of which would be decided in a plebiscite scheduled for near the end of his mandate. Mourão appreciated parliamentarism. He had a low opinion of the presidents of Brazil, especially those of the Old Republic, and of the presidential system, the root of national ills; "sooner or later the electorate would not be able to perform a miracle in choosing the president". With the end of the political crisis, the commands were rearranged and Mourão was given the 3rd Infantry Division in Santa Maria, at first on an interim basis, taking over on 13 October 1961, but on 25 March 1962, he was promoted to divisional general and remained in command until February 1963.

Mourão supported Goulart's inauguration not because he liked him but in the name of the Constitution. He hated Getulism and feared his brother-in-law, governor Leonel Brizola, for wanting the return of presidentialism. Initially concerned with the poor state of his division, he became alarmed at a dinner with Brizola and general Osvino when the Federation of Agriculture of Rio Grande do Sul (FARSUL) congress was taking place on 7 January 1962. Thinking that Mourão, defender of Goulart's inauguration, was on their side, they exposed their ambitions for basic reforms, including the reform of the Constitution to implement agrarian reform, and the anticipation of the plebiscite to restore presidentialism. It would be a breach of the 1961 agreement. Together with his vision of what was happening in the city — the memory of divided garrisons and leftist sergeants during the succession crisis of the previous year, the heightened spirits left by it and union and communist agitation, especially on the railroads — Mourão concluded there could be a conspiracy against the regime. He believed that Goulart and Brizola were not communists, but would be eliminated to make way for Luís Carlos Prestes. Thus, on 7 January 1962, Mourão's conspiracy began. Initially against Brizola, in February it was time to overthrow Goulart. He feared a coup by the president supported by his generals.

== 1964 coup d'état ==
=== 1962–64 ===
For two years, two months and twenty-three days Mourão was "a good organizer, considered courageous and impetuous" at civil and military circles and at state and national levels. He thought he was the protagonist of the "greatest conspiracy in the Americas". (Note: As he puts it himself in Mourão Filho 2011, p. 238.) However, he was neither its origin nor its owner. Movements against Goulart already existed in the complex formed by the Institute of Research and Social Studies (IPES), the Brazilian Institute of Democratic Action (IBAD) and the Superior School of War, representing the "modernizing" officers and their allies in the national elite. Even acting almost alone, Mourão's advances were parallel to those of this complex, which sought to control and employ him. He was a "bait", diverting the attention of the government — his conspiracy was open and well known — and instilled the spirit of the garrisons against Goulart, but he was also feared for his impetuosity, which they tried to neutralize so that his efforts would not be lost in a sudden movement. Furthermore, his disrepute among officers continued into the 1960s. Mourão also confirmed to Hélio Silva that he knew about the conspirators contact with the United States and the possibility of an American navy squadron approaching the Brazilian coast.

=== In Santa Maria ===
Mourão's first contact was with his chief of staff, Ramão de Menna Barreto. Mourão verified the loyalty of his subordinates and established contacts within Rio Grande do Sul. He secured most of Third Army – the 2nd and 3rd Cavalry Divisions, the 5th and 6th Infantry Divisions and the Artillery Division of the 6th Infantry Division. He did not touch the 1st Cavalry Division of Oromar Osório, to his west in Santiago, as Osório was "entirely dedicated to the President". In June, he already had general Penha Brasil, from the 3rd Army, and Nélson de Melo, from the 2nd, but he did not reach the Ministry of War (João Segadas Viana), the 1st (Osvino) and 4th Armies (Costa e Silva), and the Military Cabinet (Amaury Kruel). In addition to the emissaries and meetings in the south, Mourão made several trips to São Paulo and Rio de Janeiro. He sought funding for the opposition in the electoral campaign and in Rio de Janeiro he enlisted admiral Sílvio Heck to his cause, capable of capturing other high ranking officials including marshal Odylio Denys. IPESUL, the branch of IPES in Rio Grande do Sul, was in control: Menna Barreto was a member and Penha Brasil was linked to IBAD.

In July, however, command of the Third Army passed to Jair Dantas Ribeiro, who was loyal to the government and now had the two strongest armies (1st and 3rd) guaranteed. Mourão feared a coup by Goulart if the Chamber of Deputies did not anticipate the plebiscite, but the Chamber granted it and would soon restore presidential powers. Mourão then preached to the troops that "with such powers he [Goulart] will carry out his coup" and thought of an offensive against Porto Alegre, the "Plano Junção" (Junction Plan). In reaction to a government move, such as the closing of Congress, the 3rd Infantry Division would leave behind a unit to guard the southwest against the 1st Cavalry Division and jump all at once northwest of Porto Alegre, on the north bank of the Jacuí River. There, it would join the 6th Infantry Division and, collaborating with anti-Brizola elements from Rio Grande do Sul's Military Brigade, it would invade the Third Army's HQ. In Mourão's meetings with Rio Grande do Sul governor Ildo Meneghetti, the idea of what would become Operation Farroupilha was born. However, in November Amaury Kruel, the Minister of War, informed him that he would take over the 2nd Military Region in São Paulo. Mourão left for São Paulo in March 1963. Jair Dantas noticed his conspiratorial work, but called it "national security studies".

=== In São Paulo ===
Mourão assumed command of the 2nd Military Region on 15 March 1963 and would remain there until 21 August of the same year. In consultation with a cardiologist, he heard that he was "our last hope": his name was already known in São Paulo's high society as an anti-Goulart force. São Paulo did not have a strong military garrison, but it was a good environment for civilian mobilization. This task was delegated to reserve general Sebastião Dalísio Menna Barreto and a civilian General Staff, as the conspiracy was bigger, coming to the attention of the CIA. The civilian articulation was enough to foresee the formation of paramilitary forces. IPES was stronger and exercised greater control. The population had been ideologically influenced from a long time.

Mourão brought many garrisons from São Paulo to his side and made contact with the 6th Military Region, in Bahia. He drew up new military plans: the 2nd Army HQ would be taken over, and its commander, Peri Constant Bevilacqua, would either accept command of the operation or be deposed. Ideally, he would accept. The revolutionary leader would be an army general like Cordeiro de Farias or Nelson de Melo. A task force — three infantry battalions, one from São Paulo's Military Police and a group of howitzers — would leave at 7:00 PM and travel down Via Dutra as quickly as possible towards Guanabara, arriving at least as far as Barra do Piraí. All the rest of the available force would follow behind and the Third Army, already influenced, would come as reinforcement. There would be stop lines if the First Army counterattacked. Mourão's ultimate goal was:

The movement, if it is victorious, as it infallibly should be, will elect a civilian president to complete the five-year period, while the Civil-Military Council, presided over by me, will study and present the reforms to the Constitution with the change in the form of Government.

Mourão had a military and a civilian General Staff, with extensive connections in the São Paulo elite. On the home front there would be "censorship of all telephones", "occupation of all unions and arrest of communist and union leaders" and the prevention of sabotage. Civilians prioritized psychological preparedness and mobilization. Mourão wanted a paramilitary Civil Guard to garrison points, freeing up forces. To this end, short barrel 22 caliber carbines for riots were manufactured by IMBEL in Itajubá.

In July, in a meeting with Carlos Lacerda (now governor of Guanabara), Júlio de Mesquita Filho, owner of O Estado de S. Paulo, and Adhemar de Barros, governor of São Paulo, they suggested that Mourão succeed Goulart within Jânio's five-year period. In another meeting with judge Antônio Neder and admiral Heck, marshal Odylio Denys went further and saw Mourão as the future dictator, but Mourão insisted he was a democrat.

That same month Mourão found out that he would be removed from São Paulo for conspiring against the government. His new destination, the 4th Military Region/Infantry Division, in Minas Gerais, was militarily less dangerous. In order to dispel suspicions, he angrily left a ceremony in which the Secretary of Justice of the State declared that there was "a communist movement led from the Alvorada Palace, by the President of the Republic himself". The act was not convincing and in these final months São Paulo already lost strength, with the military conspiracy flowing to general Agostinho Cortes, linked to Golbery and IPES. On 21 August, Mourão left command of the 2nd Military Region.

=== In Juiz de Fora ===
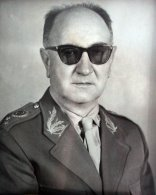
Carlos Luís Guedes and Magalhães Pinto, allied in the conspiracy in Minas Gerais

The transfer to Minas Gerais was a punishment, taking Mourão to a less relevant command. Had it not been for his friendship with Jair Dantas Ribeiro, now Minister of War, Mourão might have received a bureaucratic position. He took over the 4th Military Region/Infantry Division, in Juiz de Fora, on 28 August 1963. There he found a weak garrison and little "revolutionary" talk, but he was closer to Guanabara and was the highest military authority in the state. The social scene was the same and so was the strong structure of IPES. The CIA noted that his arrival could interfere with the succession game.

In his home state he had contact with two presidential candidates: Juscelino Kubitschek and governor Magalhães Pinto (UDN), the latter was one of the three great figures of the coup in Minas Gerais. He also had contact with general Carlos Luís Guedes, his subordinate, with the Divisional Infantry in Belo Horizonte. Upon his arrival, Mourão explained his intentions to Pinto and Guedes and they worked together. Guedes contributed to the Military Police of Minas Gerais (PMMG), incorporated into the coup plans. But their interests were not the same: Guedes was aligned with IPES and acted to restrict Mourão. The two generals had a terrible relationship. (Note: Gaspari 2014: "They hated each other. Mourão called Guedes an 'unbearable loudmouth' and Guedes saw him as indecisive".) Magalhães, in turn, is quoted as being aligned with IPES or as an ally of Mourão and having separate ambitions.

Mourão sounded out allies, finding, among others, lieutenant colonel Everaldo José da Silva. He formed a "Revolutionary General Staff" and preached to his commanders, discussing the reality of the country and criticizing the government. In Juiz de Fora, even civilians — "teachers, businessmen, dentists, lawyers, doctors and taxi drivers" — were invited to lectures at the 4th Military Region/Infantry Division's HQ. According to Mourão, it accelerated the instruction of the troops, but it was not noticed.

Mourão visited Rio de Janeiro several times; he received private airline tickets without the government's knowledge. Everaldo and Mourão still had contact with the civilian General Staff in São Paulo. Deeming the government a "house of cards", Mourão was in a hurry to act. He wanted "Operation Popeye", a surprise attack on Rio de Janeiro, crossing the borders at night. As Guedes preferred to proclaim the rebellion and defend the State, which Mourão judged impossible with the available military strength and the state's vast borders, in December Mourão recruited general Antônio Carlos Muricy to lead the operation.

=== March 1964 ===
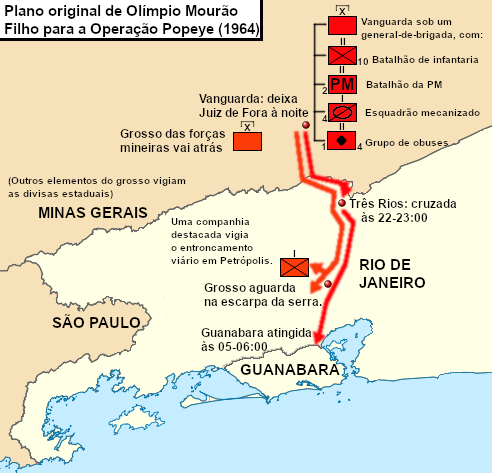
The original, unapplied plan of Operation Popeye

The events of the month – the central rally in Rio de Janeiro and those by Brizola and Miguel Arraes in Belo Horizonte and Juiz de Fora – reinforced Mourão's conviction in the advance of communism and reached its climax with the Revolt of the sailors in Holy Week. On the 27th, Friday, Mourão was called to Belo Horizonte due to the repercussions of the revolt. Magalhães Pinto, the civilian leader of the "revolution", promised to deliver a manifesto demanding the deposition of the president, giving the necessary political support to the military deployment already on Saturday night, erupting in Rio de Janeiro at dawn on Sunday. However, a dispute arose for protagonism within the movement, with Magalhães seeking to maximize his electoral gain in 1965. Both suspected that each other wanted to steal the laurels of victory.

The following day, the governor visited Juiz de Fora empty-handed and there was no rush. Mourão insisted on receiving the manifesto so that he could move the troops; instead, on the 30th, Magalhães published a manifesto in Belo Horizonte, without asking for the president's deposition, and Mourão found out through a telephone call from Guedes. He was indignant with both. In Belo Horizonte they were already in revolt, putting themselves in danger, as Mourão could crush them supported by the First Army or the government, if it realized what was happening, could crush Minas Gerais. Suspecting that the vague terms of the governor's manifesto were Magalhães way of keeping himself away from the movement in case of failure, in his memoirs Mourão called him a traitor and claimed to have ordered Guedes to arrest him, who did not want to obey.

The testimonies of Mourão and Guedes contradict each other about these last days. Guedes considered Mourão undecided, in agreement with the report by Rubens Bayma Denys, the son of Odílio Denys, who participated in the meeting on the 28th. Guedes also claimed to have sent two retired generals to Juiz de Fora to take over from Mourão if he gave up. According to Guedes, he and Magalhães wanted to leave on the 30th, while Mourão, at that point, only accepted a start in April.

Finally, receiving the manifesto at dawn on the 31st by the governor's emissaries and seeing it without the demand for his deposition, Mourão himself launched the coup by launching telephone calls at 5:00 AM. What allowed him to make the final decision independently of Magalhães and Guedes was having the troops in his hands thanks to the anticommunist proselytism carried out in the previous months. He also took care not to act alone: on the 28th he sent lieutenant colonel Everaldo to São Paulo to see if he could count on the commander of the Second Army, Amaury Kruel. In the absence of a response, Everaldo went to Rio de Janeiro to meet with Amaury's brother, Riograndino Kruel, who gave his endorsement.

The outbreak on 31 March was carried out over the heads of the conspirators in São Paulo and Rio de Janeiro, who wanted a later date. The precipitation of the coup was alternatively interpreted among other soldiers as necessary to break the inertia or as a delaying factor in the adhesion of other forces. Many soldiers censured Mourão for ignoring the authority of Castelo Branco and Costa e Silva, whom he made amends for, and consider him untimely, but some believed that it was not an impetuous act, but the culmination of a long process. According to José Antônio Barbosa de Moraes, one of his General Staff officers, the move was not precipitated as Mourão “did not know any predetermined time”. The extensive preparations put in place at the time of the outbreak show that the decision was not passionate.

=== Night of 31 March ===
Around 2:00 AM or after 2:30 AM Mourão Filho received the governor's secretaries, José Maria Alkmin and Monteiro de Castro. They brought the manifesto, which was as disappointing as he'd expected - "With this manifesto I won't remove even a soldier from the barracks". Such was the disapproval received that they left in 10 minutes, without time to hear him read his own manifesto and without realizing that he intended to "push the button" in a few hours. With a lit pipe, he wrote in his diary in a farewell tone and doubting whether he would succeed. "The whole Army comes against me".

At 04–05:00 AM, in pajamas and a red silk robe, he occupied the telephone station in Juiz de Fora with the Military Police and sent phone calls across the country:

- To major Antônio Cúrcio Neto to put the troops on standby, order repeated at 06:30;
- To Guedes, to start his part in the plan of operations, dispatch a battalion to Juiz de Fora; and arrest the governor if he gave up (information present in the memoirs of both);
- To deputy Armando Falcão to warn Carlos Lacerda;
- To admiral Sílvio Heck to act in the Navy;
- To colonels Jaime Portela de Melo and Ramiro Gonçalves to advise their companions in Rio de Janeiro to come to Juiz de Fora. They did not come, and Mourão found them newly installed in bureaucratic positions when he arrived in Rio de Janeiro;
- To reserve general José Varonil de Albuquerque Lima, the son-in-law of Maria Tavares Bastos, Mourão's wife, to notify the companions who wanted to come, and to send Maria's brother-in-law to the place in Teresópolis, where he would send her;
- To doctor José Paranhos do Rio Branco to notify Ademar de Barros and part of the officers in São Paulo.

There are version differences about the phone calls. Jaime Portela de Melo denies that he was called to Minas Gerais, but claims that he was instructed to alert Costa e Silva. Ending the calls at 06:40, Mourão woke up judge Neder and sent his wife Maria to Teresópolis, away from the imminent conflict and before the loyalists blocked the road.

=== In campaign ===
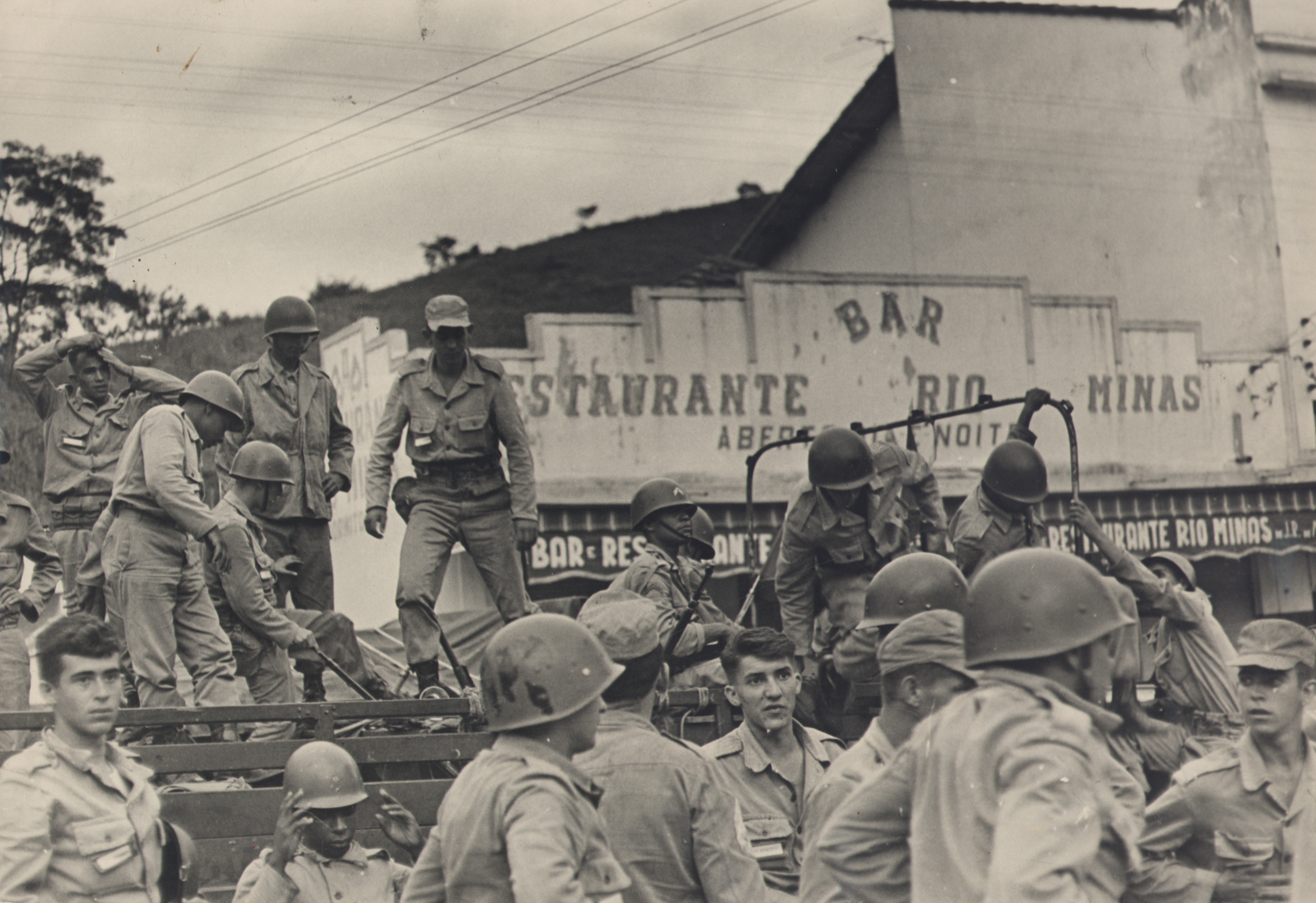
The Tiradentes Detachment in Areal

With the PMMG and the Federal Army in Minas Gerais under his command, Mourão carried out operations "Silêncio", controlling telecommunications, "Gaiola", arresting "suspicious elements" already monitored by the police, and "Popeye", moving troops against Rio de Janeiro and Brasília. This movement took time: the bulk of the "Tiradentes Detachment" formed to invade Rio de Janeiro and placed under the command of Muricy only arrived at the Paraibuna River, on the Rio de Janeiro border, at 17:00. The commander of the 10th Infantry Regiment did not join and had to be replaced. A battalion of the 12th Infantry Regiment sent from Belo Horizonte by Guedes did not arrive in Juiz de Fora until 22:00 and, moreover, lacking personnel.

Mourão denied that he was in rebellion, but as soon as the Detachment arrived at the border, from Juiz de Fora he issued his manifesto: the President "must be removed from the Power he abuses, in order, according to the Law, to operate his succession, maintaining the legal order". The manifesto associated the president with communism, but according to Mourão, this was added by judge Antônio Neder and was not his own writing, as he did not consider Goulart a communist.

The federal government, in turn, announced his dismissal and the sending of forces from the First Army to suffocate him; these forces were stronger than those of Mourão's 4th Division and the PMMG. The first, the 1st Battalion of Caçadores from Petrópolis, set up a front line against the Tiradentes Detachment that night.

Informed that lieutenant colonel Kerensky, commander of the loyalist battalion, intended to start negotiations, Mourão went to Muricy's command post on the banks of the Paraibuna. There he also found a lieutenant of the 1st Battalion of Caçadores who promised to return with his platoon. The defections weakened Kerensky's battalion, which retreated. "Fight or join". Mourão returned at dawn on 1 April to Juiz de Fora, where he was informed that the Second Army had joined the rebellion. Later it was discovered that Amaury Kruel offered Goulart to crush the 4th Infantry Division, but judged that his past in São Paulo would prevent the São Paulo troops from facing it. Mourão was overjoyed at the news, at dawn, of the accession of the next loyalist echelon, the 1st Infantry Regiment.

=== Entering Rio de Janeiro ===
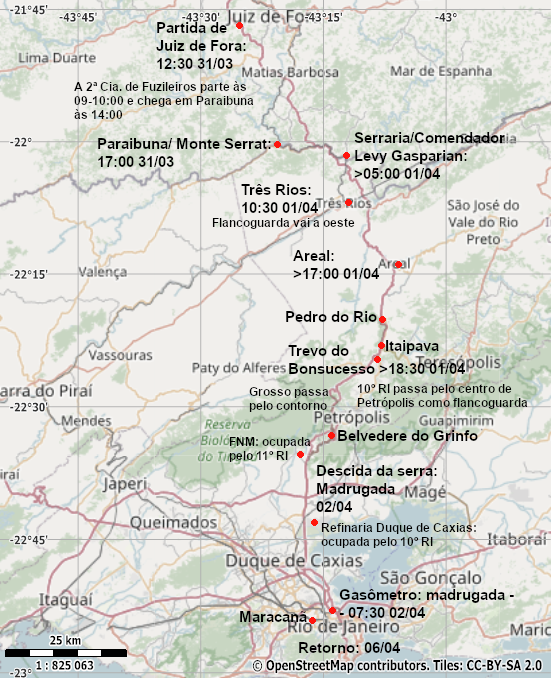
Route taken by Mourão's forces

Finally, Goulart fled from Rio de Janeiro and at 3:00 PM general Milton, head of the EM of the 1st Army, asked him to surrender. When Muricy announced that the road was clear, Mourão left the HQ and found him at the level of Belvedere do Grinfo. Mourão worried that Kruel would take over the government – "That would be the end".

By his side were Neder and his wife Maria. She did not want to take refuge in Teresópolis and accepted the risk of remaining in the revolted territory. On the car radio they heard that Costa e Silva had taken over the empty Ministry of War and appointed general Ururahy to the First Army. "They are taking my positions! This position was mine! I should have been the commander of the First Army!" As the most senior general in the Army and "the undisputed Military Leader of the Revolution, entering Guanabara victorious, at the head of my troops", Mourão considered the First Army to be his by right. Ururahy was out of commission and had done nothing for the revolt. For Muricy, Mourão wanted to have been the minister, or even the president.

However, due to respect for the hierarchy, Mourão could only present himself to Costa e Silva, as Muricy suggested, since it was no longer possible to invade the Army HQ. Muricy followed behind to also argue with Costa e Silva, under Maria's insistence — "go upstairs and see Mourão, because they're going to wrap him up". He defined her as "very ambitious". In the middle of the night Mourão showed up at the Duque de Caxias Palace, (Note: Mourão Filho 2011, p. 397 places the conversation at 03:20. Hernani D'Aguiar, in The Revolution from the Inside (1976), and Elio Gaspari place it at 02:30.) where he found Costa e Silva sleeping. (Note: The 9th floor, where the Minister of War's office was located, was empty. Mourão found Costa e Silva on the 6th floor, and described the place as follows: "Upon entering the 6th floor, the atmosphere was terrible. Due to the cold, all the windows were closed. The entire floor was turned into a bedroom. Camp beds leaning against each other. A bad smell of men at the end of their journey, mixed with that of unlit cigarettes. The 6th floor reminded me of a cornered animal den. My mood couldn't be worse. A colonel came to meet me. There were dozens of them, tunic unbuttoned, hair in disarray, rubbing their eyes, no military attitude before me, a general of division. When I asked about general Costa e Silva, that colonel answered me with reservation, as if I were a candidate for an audience with His Excellency. the Commander in Chief: 'His Excellency is sleeping, Mr. General.'" Mourão Filho 2011, pp. 396–397.)

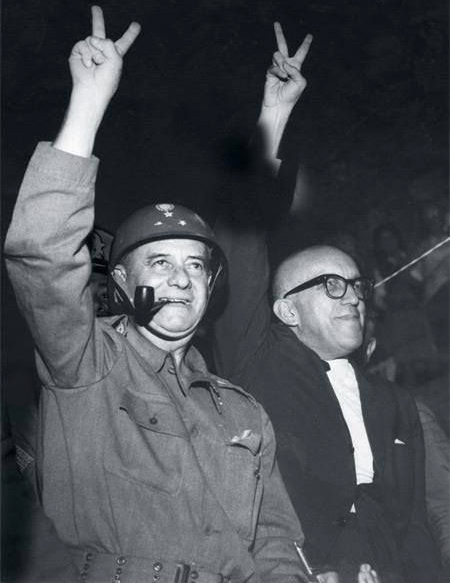
Mourão and Magalhães Pinto

Mourão Filho could only recognize Costa e Silva's authority, deny that he had ambitions and protest that it would have been more delicate to wait a little longer before Ururahy's appointment. He wanted to withdraw his troops after midday, but accepted Costa e Silva's request to leave them in Guanabara for a few more days. They had a second conversation at 09–10:00, already on the 9th floor. Mourão was offered command of Petrobras to purge the communists present there. At the headquarters of the state-owned company, he discovered that only the president would have authority for such an offer. Muricy, Magalhães Pinto and Guedes were unable to convince the new Minister of War to change his decision.

For Muricy, Guedes and Magalhães Pinto, the decision to install Ururahy in the First Army and send Mourão Filho to Petrobras was a way of marginalizing the Minas Gerais conspirators. According to brigadier João Paulo Moreira Burnier, Costa e Silva did not trust leaving the First Army in the hands of Mourão due to his impetuosity in launching the coup. Mourão, in turn, resigned himself to fatigue, concern for Kruel — who, at least, did not come to power either — and for thinking that Costa e Silva, although illegitimate, was his hierarchical superior and "the legal order possible to get". He accepted the decision even though he feared the "Supreme Commander General" — "this title has the flavor of a Spanish dictator".

Mourão remained in Rio de Janeiro for a few more days. According to him, on the 3rd he was sought out by generals who supported Castelo Branco, including marshal Ademar de Queirós:

He told me that Costa e Silva “had the fumes of a dictator", and that those generals gathered there wanted to go, led by me, to "El Supremo" to warn him to calm down, otherwise he would be removed from power and I, gen. Mourão, would assume the position of Minister of War.

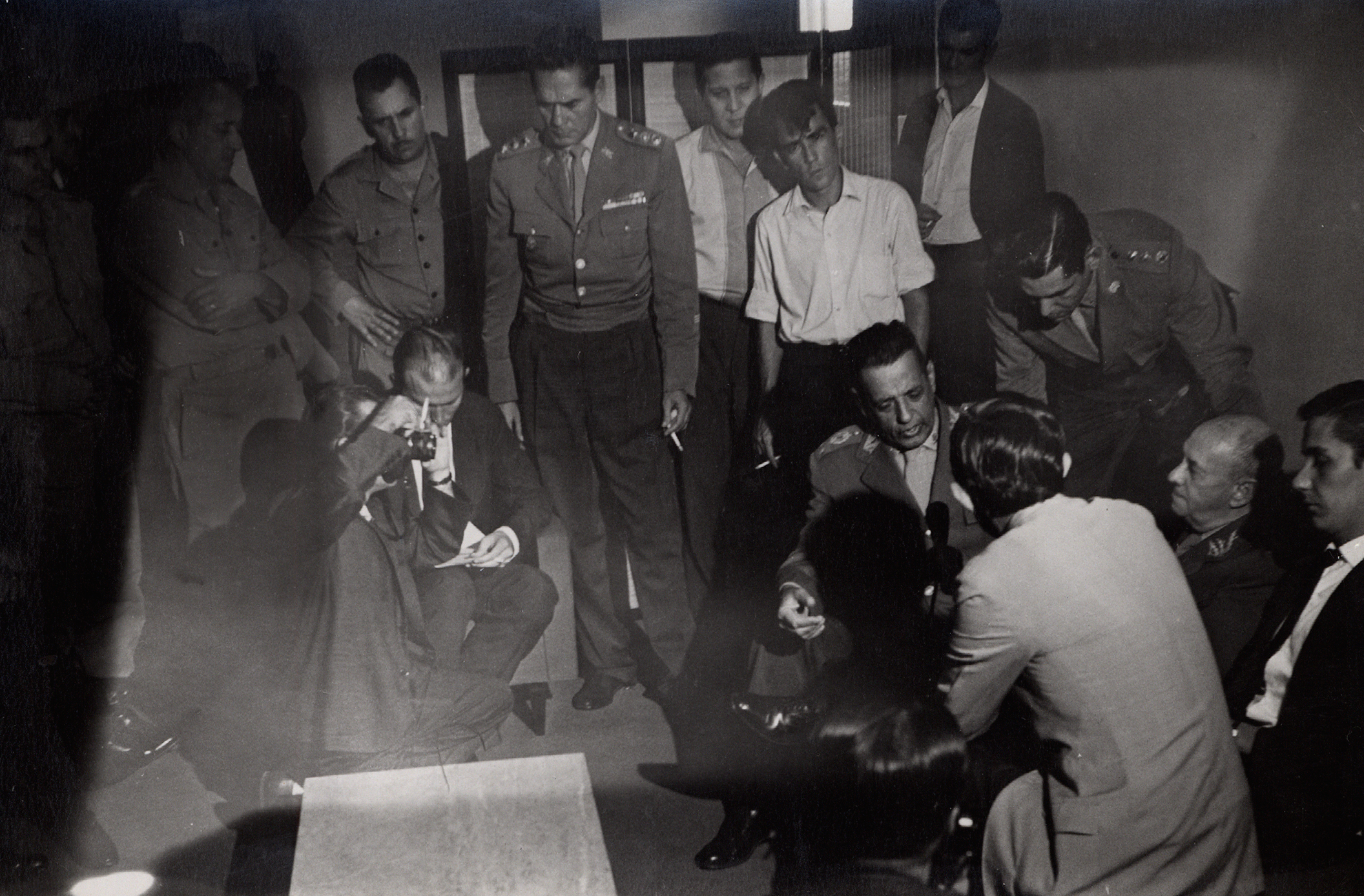
Mourão being interviewed by the press in Rio de Janeiro

However, the suggestion came to nothing. On the 4th, Juscelino Kubitschek asked Mourão whether he should support Castelo Branco's candidacy for the Presidency. "Support Castello; I guarantee you will not be a candidate for 1965". Some deputies wanted to launch Mourão's name to the presidency, but he refused; his preferred military candidate would be marshal Eurico Gaspar Dutra.

On the 6th, Mourão returned to Juiz de Fora with his troops, surrounded by celebration, but empty-handed, considering himself defeated. Guedes and Magalhães Pinto condemned his decision not to invade the Army HQ. The delegation of command to Muricy also weighed in his loss of space. He might have been more successful commanding the troops himself and taking the Ministru of War. In turn, Mourão speculated that the governor could have become president if he had come to Juiz de Fora and headed a provisional government, naming him Minister of War. Mourão claimed that, "If I had known general Costa e Silva as I do today, I would have expelled him from the General Headquarters"; "That's when Brazil's disgrace began. I had taken the nation out of one abyss and thrust it into another".

== Final years ==
=== Aftermath of the coup ===
Mourão was promoted to army general on 30 April 1964. In May, asked by Correio da Manhã about the political situation of Magalhães Pinto, Mourão said that it was "very solid". When the same question was asked about Juscelino Kubitschek, Mourão declared: "In terms of politics, I don't understand anything. I'm a cow in uniform". Kubitschek's impeachment was proposed by the hard-line military officers and was approved by the government in June. Mourão denied having made any pronouncements to the press and avoided the subject.

His roles in the Cohen Plan and the 1964 coup are his two most famous moments in history. However, despite his role in the beginning of the 1964 coup, Mourão did not dominate its sequel and outcome. Mourão had acted "at the edge of the groups with decision-making power, failing to reap personal fruits with the success of the coup". Sidelined, the only reason he did not retire was due to an age limit, which would occur on 9 May, due to pressure from his allies (among them Magalhães Pinto and Guedes) in the National Congress, which promoted him to army general, overcoming Costa e Silva's opposition. Mourão gave up retirement and applied for the Third Army. According to him, he had the possibilities of the 2nd and 3rd Armies, but Costa e Silva did not want to remove Poppe de Figueiredo from command of the 3rd, because "I [Mourão] cannot insult the boy who entered Porto Alegre in a war operation!"; "And what about me? Didn't I enter Rio de Janeiro on war operations and you took away command of the First Army that belonged to me?"

Mourão commanded the IV Army, in Recife, from 4 August to 24 September of that same year. However, his statements were considered a hindrance to the government, which transferred him to the reserve and appointed him justice at the Superior Military Court (STM), the place of "honorable ostracism of dissidents". Thus, Mourão was removed from the government for disagreeing with Castelo Branco. "It was clearly an honorary position that removed him, definitively, from the political-state reorganization initiated after the coup". This fate contrasts with that of Guedes, who, although without the reputation of a leader, ascended to the command of the 2nd Military Region and temporarily of the 2nd Army. What Mourão declared as his political objective, that a civilian complete the five-year term of Jânio Quadros until the 1965 election, did not materialize, establishing the military dictatorship.

=== Positions in the military dictatorship ===
Mourão's political trajectory during the dictatorship was erratic and thus difficult to classify into a faction, having criticized the Castelo Branco and Costa e Silva governments. He was a representative of the "old revolutionary guard", now without troop commands and hurt by his exclusion from the government. Claiming a "very hard line" in August 1964, he took positions similar to those of admiral Heck and accused the Sorbonne Group of being composed only of sympathizers of the "revolution" who stole his victory and diverted its course. In 1966, he clashed with Péri Constant Bevilacqua in the STM, opposing the amnesty for those punished by the coup, and, despite already being on a dissident path, in October he rejected the Declaration of Lisbon by Carlos Lacerda against the dictatorship.

After initially defending greater authoritarianism, Mourão became a supporter of democratization after Institutional Act No. 2, in 1965, which he deemed "killer of liberty and demoralizing the Judiciary". The Act was the government's response to the 1965 elections, which Mourão defended. In an interview with considerable repercussion, in January 1966, Mourão changed his position on the amnesty of political figures, defending Juscelino Kubitschek in particular. The following day, Guedes voiced his opposition to a general amnesty. In May, he was willing to run for the Brazilian Democratic Movement (MDB) in the next presidential elections on a democratic and nationalist platform, condemning Castelo Branco's economic and financial policy. He denounced the 1967 Constitution, the new Press Law and the National Security Law (LSN) as having plunged Brazil into a "long medieval night" and in 1967 expressed his hope that Costa e Silva, the new president, would annul the LSN. Still with liberal and civilist claims, in March 1968 Mourão supported general Poppe de Figueiredo's appeal for a civilian candidate in the 1970 presidential election. Brazilianist Maud Chirio evaluated Mourão's path as an "unskillful opportunism". Considered a nuisance by radicals, Mourão was one of the intended targets of brigadier Burnier in the Para-Sar Case.

Mourão remained on the Court from 30 September 1964 until 3 May 1969. Within the STM, he acted as its president between 17 March 1967 and 17 March 1969. The appointment was part of an initial goodwill of the Costa e Silva government with the opponents of Castelo Branco, but Mourão disagreed with Costa e Silva over the course of the case trials and prepared a new Code of Military Justice to strengthen his independence from the president.

== Works ==
=== Published during his lifetime ===
- Instrução da Milícia – Noções Elementares da Doutrina (para uso dos Milicianos) (1934). In: Barroso, Gustavo. O que o Integralista deve saber (1935)
- Do Liberalismo ao Integralismo (1935)
- Um ano de instrução num corpo de tropa de infantaria (1938)
- Elementos de teoria de tráfego urbano e sua aplicação na cidade do Rio de Janeiro
- Março 64: mobilização da audácia (1965) alongside José Stacchini and Odílio Denys
- Reforma para o Brasil (1969)

=== Memoirs ===
In 1971, close to his death, Mourão gave Hélio Silva the book A verdade de um revolucionário, obtaining from him the promise that he would publish it. Some excerpts were used in 1964 – golpe ou contragolpe?, from 1974, and in 1978 the entire publication was announced. Excerpts shown in the press caused great controversy and general Muniz de Aragão concluded that Mourão was crazy, resentful or the text was false. The book recounts the kidnapping of his great-nephew by the forces of repression, the existence of torture and brigadier Burnier's intention to use PARA-SAR against the population, shortly before AI-5. Laurita Mourão tried to stop the publication in court and it only occurred the following year, and only in Porto Alegre, as no publisher in Rio de Janeiro or São Paulo would accept it. Harsh with the military elite, the book was seized, the last one in the Brazil for political reasons, and only released after a court case.

Entitled Memórias: a verdade de um revolucionário, it covers the 1960s, with chapters on Rio Grande do Sul, São Paulo, Minas Gerais and the Castelo Branco and Costa e Silva governments, but also includes a preface, Mourão's diary from 1955 to 1964, a correspondence with Auro de Moura Andrade in 1970 about the conjuncture of 1962, an analysis of the conjuncture made in January, a report by the Civilian Staff of São Paulo after Mourão's departure from the state and a letter received from Raul Pilla in June 1964 about parliamentarism.

The book is harsh on the figures of the regime Mourão created, but which marginalized him. In its pages, Costa e Silva is evaluated as "a man of no culture and bad habits, in addition to the defect of being a liar and not austere", having as "dominant traits [...] ignorance and bluster". Castelo Branco is "a man of great virtues, but without any competence to govern the country". Guedes, "talker and irreverent", "undisciplined and traitorous"; "it would be better to have him against me than by my side". Magalhães Pinto is a "vain and slippery politician". Dióscoro do Vale, commander of the 12th Infantry Regiment, whose battalion arrived in Juiz de Fora late and understaffed, is accused of being either incompetent or a traitor.

Marshal José Machado Lopes defined the book as "the apology of its author as a revolutionary leader, a great liberal-democrat and self-sacrificing patriot", who unfairly lowers the image of his military colleagues to benefit his own. Lopes disputed the narrative of the memoirs about the Legality Campaign.
