= Brazilian Integralist Action Militia =

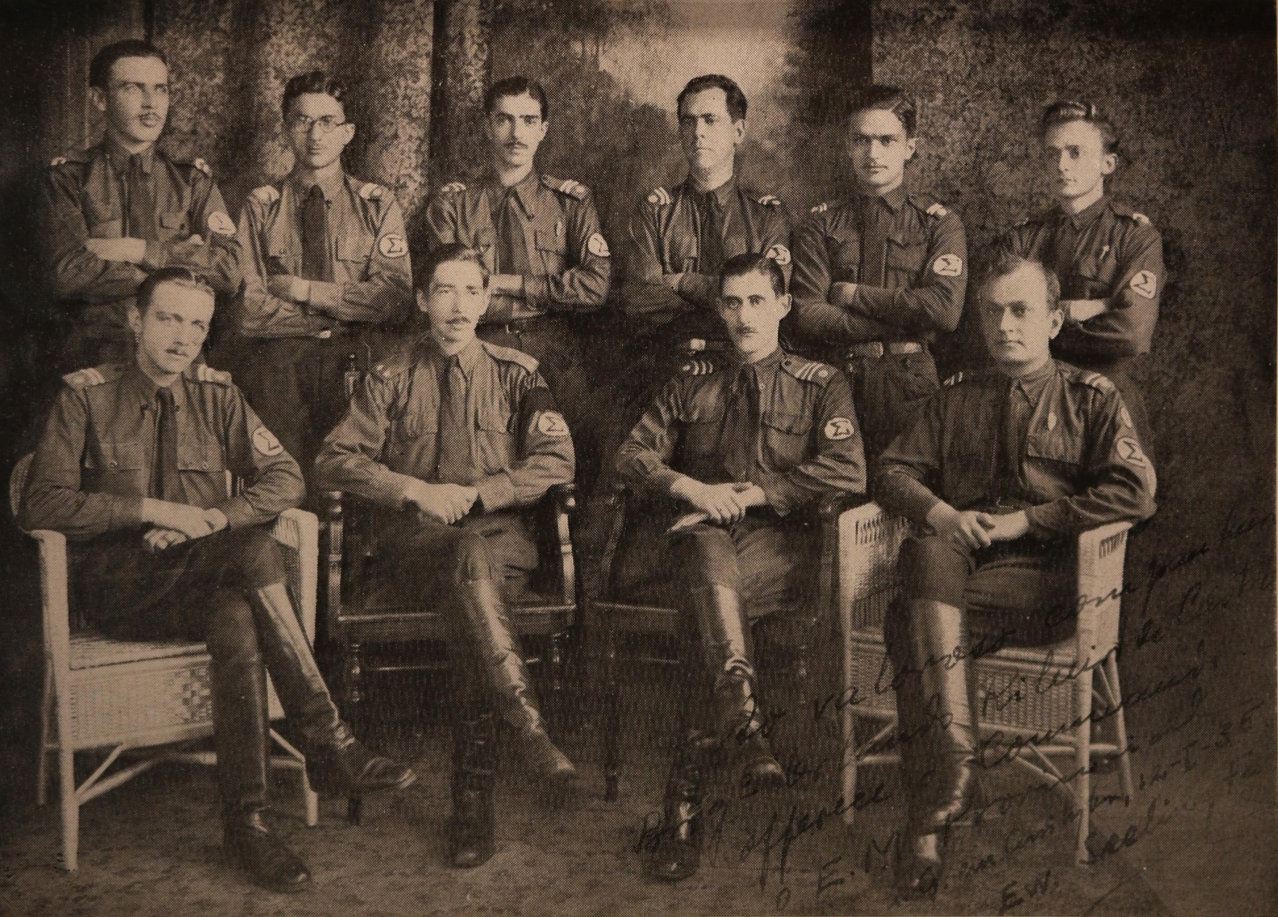
- Board of leaders of the Integralist Militia of the State of Paraná.

Agency overview
- Formed: October 7, 1932
- Dissolved: November 10, 1937
- Motto: "God, Fatherland and Family"
- Agency executives: Gustavo Barroso, (Commander); Olímpio Mourão Filho, (Chief of Staff)
- Parent agency: Brazilian Integralist Action Department of Militias

The Brazilian Integralist Action Militia were a paramilitary force linked to Brazilian Integralist Action (AIB). It was subordinated, at first, to the National Militia Department and, after the reorganization of the AIB in 1936, to the Department of Education. Both under the command of the writer and historian Gustavo Barroso and the then army captain Olímpio Mourão Filho.

== History and structure ==
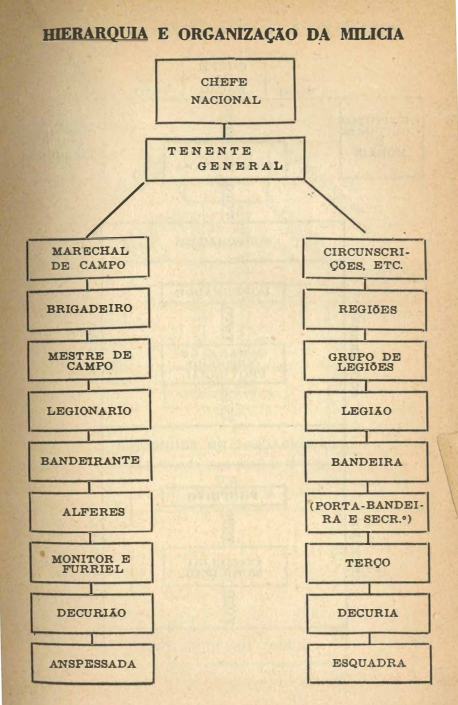
Hierarchy and organization of the militia taken from the book "What the Integralist should know" by Gustavo Barroso

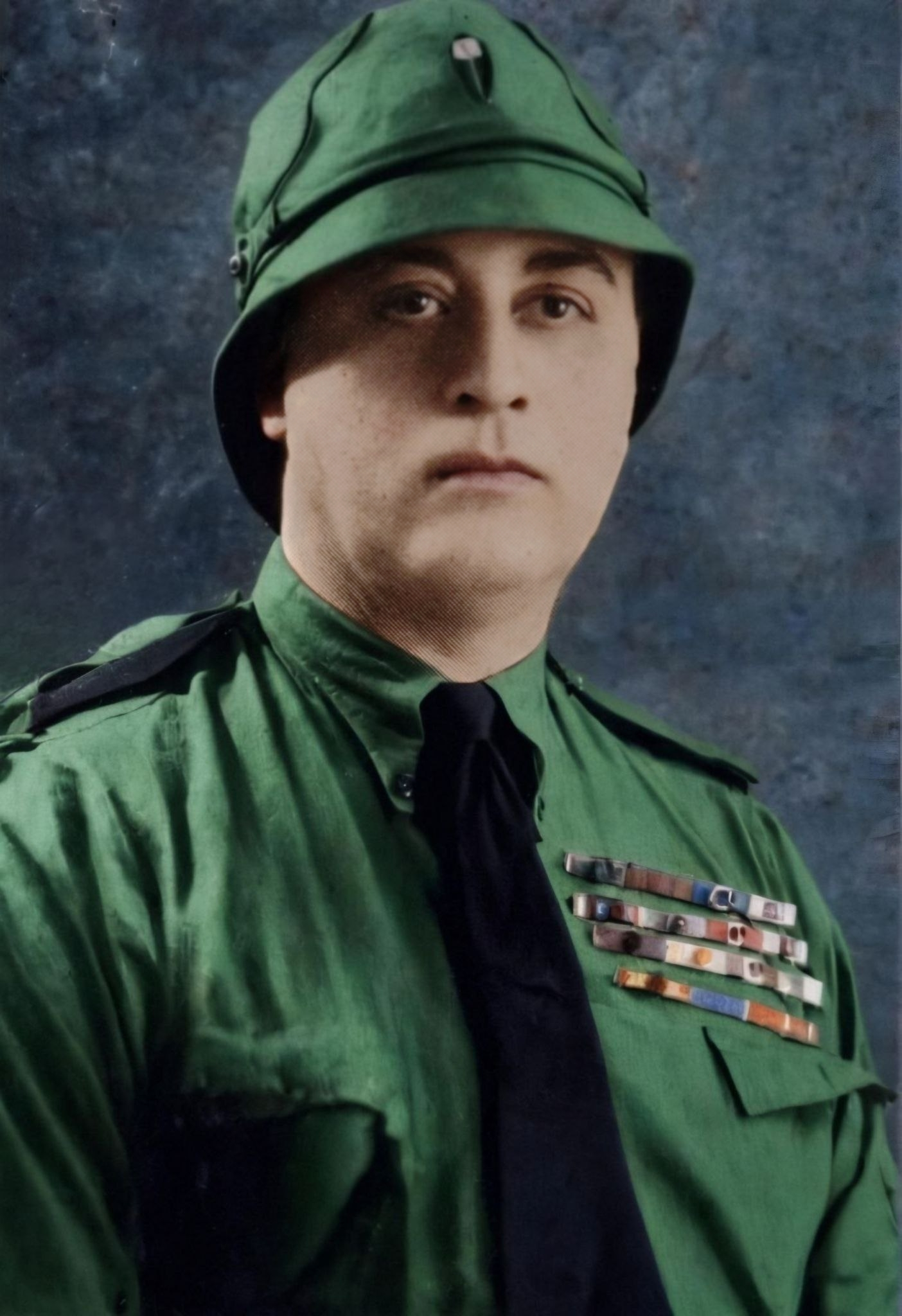
Gustavo Barroso Uniforme Integralista

According to an entry from the Getúlio Vargas Foundation: "The militia was organized by subdividing itself into 'command' and 'troops', the former as a management body and the latter as an execution body. The supreme direction of the militia belonged to the National Chief, as head of the 'Integralist forces of land, sea and air', with the support of the national secretariat responsible for the Integralist militia and the protection troops, as well as the Chief of Staff, with responsibility for the 'preparation and execution of high command decisions'. This same structure was replicated at the regional level with its local ramifications".

The Integralist militias were present throughout the Brazil's territory. In December 1933, just over 1 year after the creation of the Brazilian Integralist Action, it is already possible to find reference in the newspaper Monitor Integralista, which indicated in its pages, about the Integralist militia in the Federal District, it already had "1,800 green-shirts, workers, students, civil servants, doctors, engineers, lawyers, small industrialists and those employed in commerce".

In June 1934, with the approval by the Ministry of War of the Integralist uniform (green shirt, black tie, black or white pants, green cap and shoes, and the movement's emblem — the sigma — placed on the right arm and on the cap) regional parades and the first conflicts began. In May 1934, four thousand Integralists paraded in Rio de Janeiro, but in July uniformed militiamen from Niterói, Salvador, Recife and Belo Horizonte also marched.

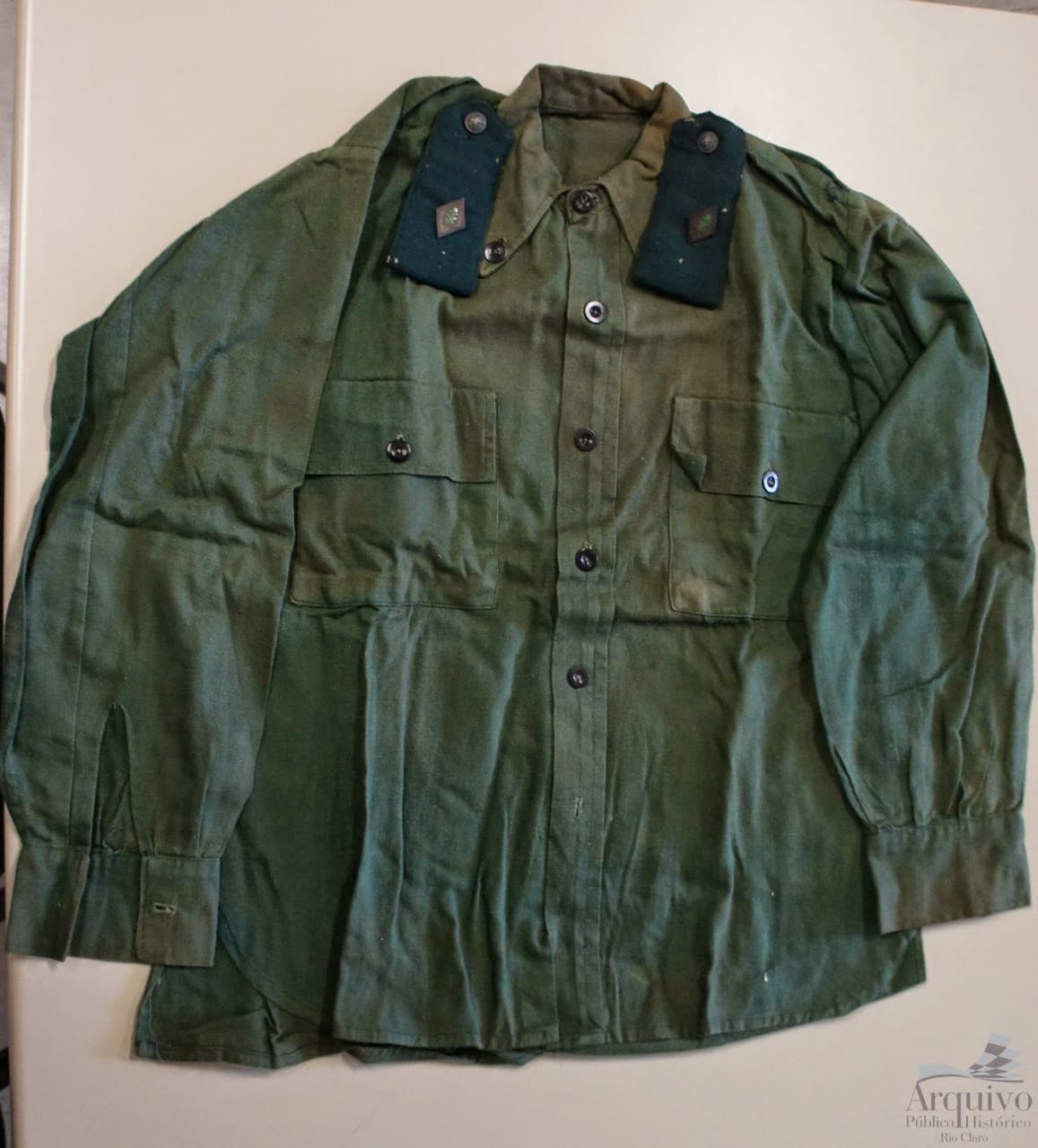
Original green shirt from the former Brazilian Integralist Action

At the 1st Integralist Congress in Vitória that officially took place on March 1, 1934, at the Teatro Carlos Gomes, the basic bodies of the political organization were established through statutes, including the militia that was being formed.

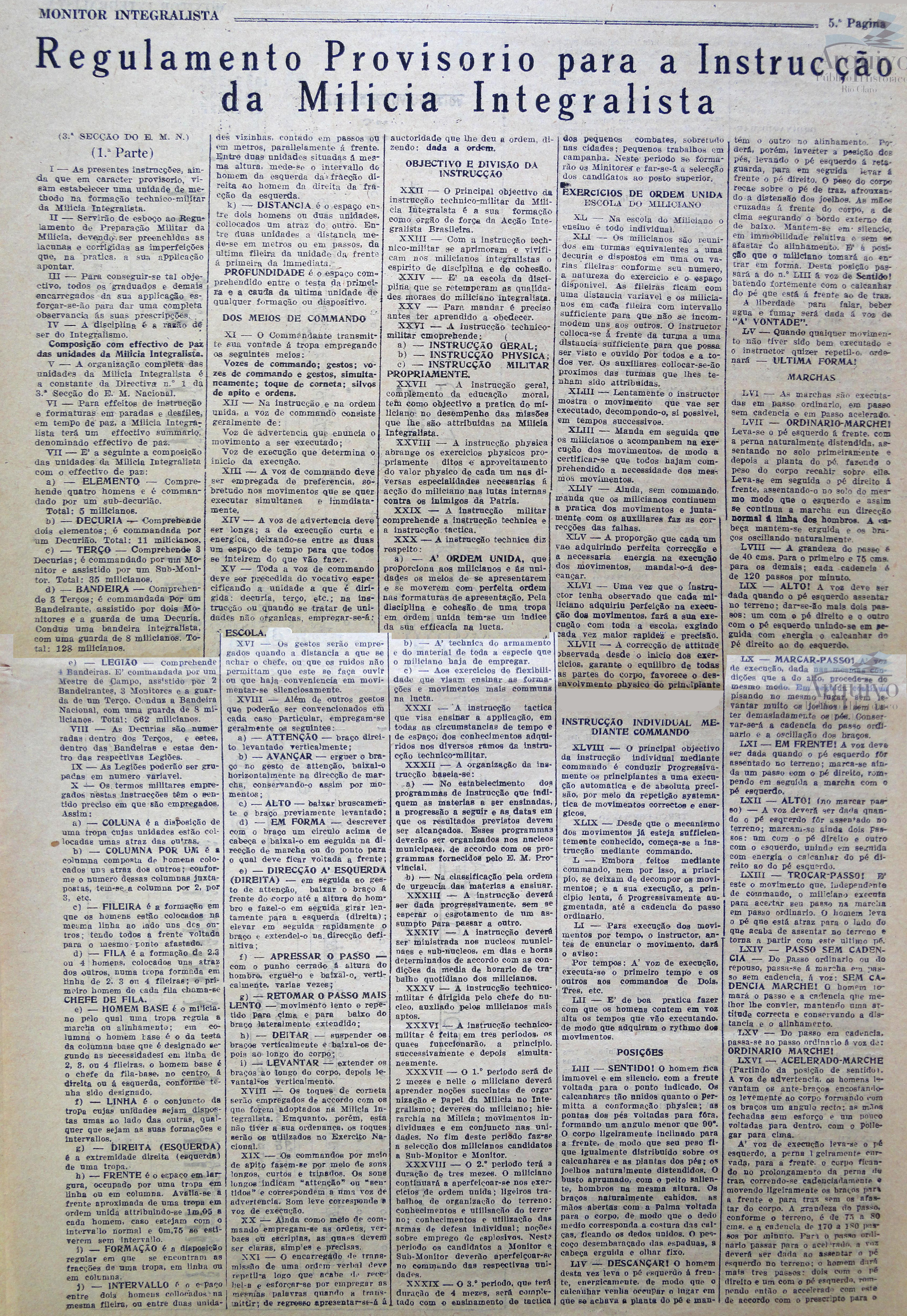

Every Integralist between the ages of 16 and 42 was obliged to register with the Integralist forces (militia), choosing the category in which they wished to join. The troops were organized into categories: first and second line militants. The militia hierarchy distinguished three levels: senior officers, officers and general officers. The structure of the militia provided for the following units: decuria, third, flag and legion, the latter consisting of four flags. The role of the militia was not only to prepare integralists for parades and physical culture, but to develop true military training, from “technical, tactical and moral” instruction to the elaboration of combat plans. The five military arms constituted the integralist “troops”: infantry, cavalry, engineering, artillery and aviation. The integralist who registered as a “first-line militant” had to undergo militia training for 60 days and then join a decuria (a unit with ten militants). After filling out a form, which recorded all the militant's abilities, the candidate took the following oath before the militia commander: “Assuming membership in the integralist militia, in the name of God and on my honor I swear: first, absolute discipline to my bosses and perfect solidarity with my comrades; second, to give my life, if necessary, for the cause of the Integralist Revolution; third, love, respect and make the National Chief respected.

The AIB militia sought inspiration from the ancient army of Rome, which is visible mainly in the name of the unit "legion" and had the following units: Element, decuria, third, flag and legion.

- Element: Comprises four men and is commanded by a sub-decurion.
  - Total: 5 militiamen
- Decuria: Comprises two elements; commanded by a decurion.
  - Total: 11 militiamen
- Third: Comprises three decurias; It is controlled by a monitor and assisted by a sub-monitor.
  - Total: 35 militiamen
- Flag: Comprises three thirds; It is commanded by a bandeirante, who is assisted by two monitors and the guard of a decuria. He carries an Integralist flag, with a guard of 8 militiamen.
  - Total: 128 militiamen
- Legion: Comprises four flags. It is commanded by a field master, assisted by 2 bandeirantes, 3 monitors and a third guard. Carries the National Flag, with a guard of 8 militiamen.
  - Total: 562 militiamen

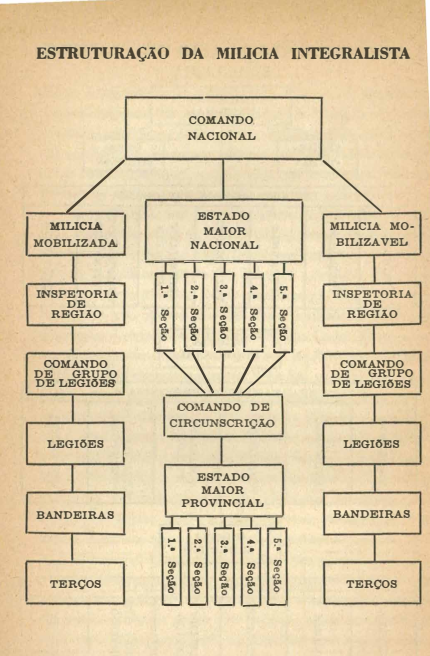
Structuring of the integralist militia. Taken from the book "What the Integralist should know"

The Brazilian Integralist Action included people of all ages, the so-called "Plinians" formed the AIB youth. Within the Integralist youth, which was part of the militia administration, young people fell into four groups:

- from 4 to 6 years old, they signed up in the "infants"
- from 6 to 9 years old, they signed up for the "curupiras"
- from 10 to 12 years old, they signed up for the "vanguardeiros"
- from 13 to 15 years old, they signed up for the "pioneers"

Plinianos had to wear a uniform: a green shirt, white or blue pants, black shoes, black cap or scout hat.

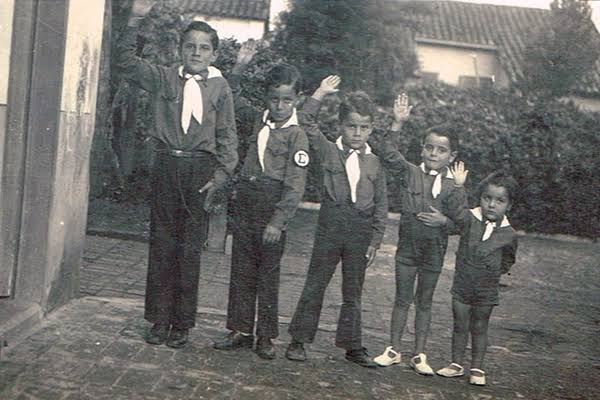
Plinianos from an integralist family saluting Anauê

== Brazilian communist uprising of 1935 ==
On November 23, 1935, at the behest of the Comintern, the so-called Communist uprising began, with the goal to take political power by force. On that occasion, the AIB militia actively participated in the counter-coup: they presented themselves at the barracks, provided information that anticipated the organization of several military garrisons, participated in blockades and helped with patrols; frustrating, as was later admitted by Luís Carlos Prestes, the uprising in Brazil.

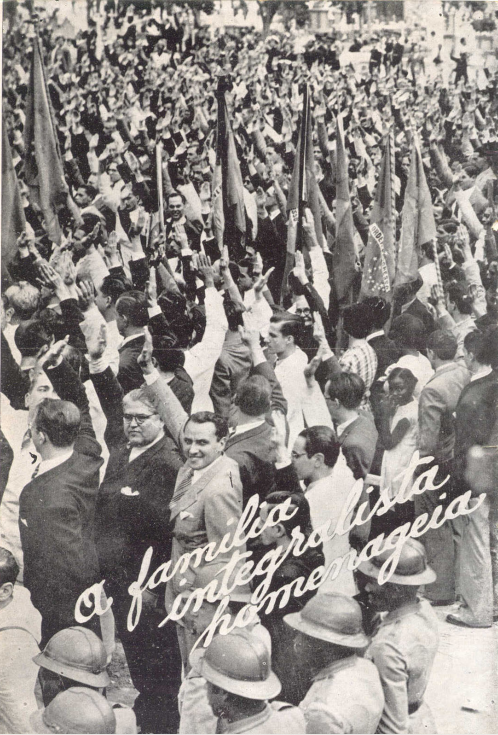
Integralists salute the soldiers killed in 1935

== Militia oaths ==
Infants received as scouts and curupiras began by taking the following oath:

Curupira's oath:

“I promise to be a little soldier of God, Country and Family; I promise to be obedient to my parents, to be friends with my brothers, colleagues and companions; I promise to apply myself to make myself useful to God, Country and Family.”

When the young vanguard reached the age of ten, he had to swear an oath to the National Flag:

Vanguardeiro's oath to the flag:

“Members took the oath for the Brazilian flag, which said: "Brazilian flag! I pledge to work for Brazil, in the times of happiness and times of pain, days of glory and days of sacrifice.”

AIB conscript militiaman's oath:

“Assuming conscript in the Integralist Militia, in the name of God and for my honor I swear: first, absolute discipline to my leaders and perfect solidarity to my comrades; second, to give my life, if necessary, for the cause of the Integralist Revolution; third, love, respect and make the National Chief respected.”
