= Anauê =

Greeting used by Brazilian integralists

Anauê is a Brazilian greeting of Indigenous origin, with documented usage in 1911 among the Nambikwara people in Mato Grosso. It was extensively used from 1923 to 1936 by the Brazilian Scouting movement, due to the movement's indigenist character. In the early 1930s, it was adopted by Brazilian Integralists, who combined it with a Fascist-inspired salute, commonly associated with the Roman salute. The appropriation of the greeting by Brazilian Integralists led to its abandonment in 1936 by the non-partisan Scouting movement, to avoid confusion with Integralism.

== Etymology ==
The use of the expression "Anauê!" as a greeting to newcomers was documented in December 1911 by Cândido da Silva Rondon as originating from the Nambikwara language.

Nevertheless, attempts have been made to classify the expression within other language families. According to Gustavo Barroso, one of the leaders of the Brazilian Integralist Action, the greeting would be a combination of different greetings existing in the Tupi language. For Luís da Câmara Cascudo, the word would have originated from the Paresi language. Being a shout, it would mean "united-with-others-equals, of solidarity, of meeting, of gathering, of rallying call. Its use as an acclamation would be an acclimatization of the military voice in civil ceremonies."

== History ==
The term was documented in December 1911 by Marshal Rondon at the mouth of the Juina River in Mato Grosso, as a specific greeting used by the Nambikwara people to announce themselves to newcomers.

In 1928, an article published in the Brazilian Maritime Review refers to the victory cry "aroeira" as part of nautic language, which allegedly derived from the Guarani "anauê".

=== Scouting movement ===
In October 1923, the scout leader Jaboty-êtê (Velho Lobo), described as a "great cultivator of national indigenismo," in an article published in the children's newspaper O Tico-Tico, recounts the use of the scout greeting of those arriving "Aná-u-ê! Aná-u-ê!" during a scout activity, answered by the greeting of those who are there: "Anê-rê! Anê-rê!", both allegedly extracted from the Tupi language. The same leader published a similar missive the following November in the Gazeta de Notícias, in which he addresses the children with the scout greeting "Ana-uê, colomys!", which according to him would mean "Greetings, boys!" in Tupi, being answered by the children with "Anê-rê! Anê-rê!", meaning "Welcome! Welcome!".

In September 1924, in the "Scouting" supplement of Tico-Tico, Velho Lobo greets American scouts with "Anauê!". In July 1925, scout leader Guilherme Azambuja Neves opened the council fire of the Fluminense FC Scouts with a triple "Anauê! Anauê! Anauê!", addressed to the scouts of Fluminense, those of Brazil, and those of the whole world.

=== Brazilian Integralism ===
Members of the Brazilian Integralist Action wore green uniforms and paraded through the streets in military-style formation, shouting "Anauê!". In October 1934, the Battle of Praça da Sé took place, where a number of anti-fascist demonstrators began with provocations such as "death to Integralism" (Brazilian Portuguese: morra o integralismo) and "get out, green chickens" (Brazilian Portuguese: fora, galinhas verdes).

According to the Integralists, the greeting "Anauê!" with a raised arm manifested the "intention of identifying with one's equals", supposedly repeating an indigenous ritual that would translate "anauê" as "I am your friend," reinforcing solidarity among people.

== In popular culture ==
In 2019, Ernesto Araújo, then Brazil's newly appointed Minister of Foreign Affairs, concluded his speech with the expression "Anauê Jaci," a supposed Tupi translation of the salutation ''Hail Mary''. The event raised hypotheses about an association between Bolsonarism and Integralism, as there are no known historical records of such a translation, whose content, in addition to being grammatically imprecise, differs from the version of the Hail Mary found in the Catecismo na Língua Brasílica.
