= Siegfried Ellwanger =

Brazilian industrialist and writer

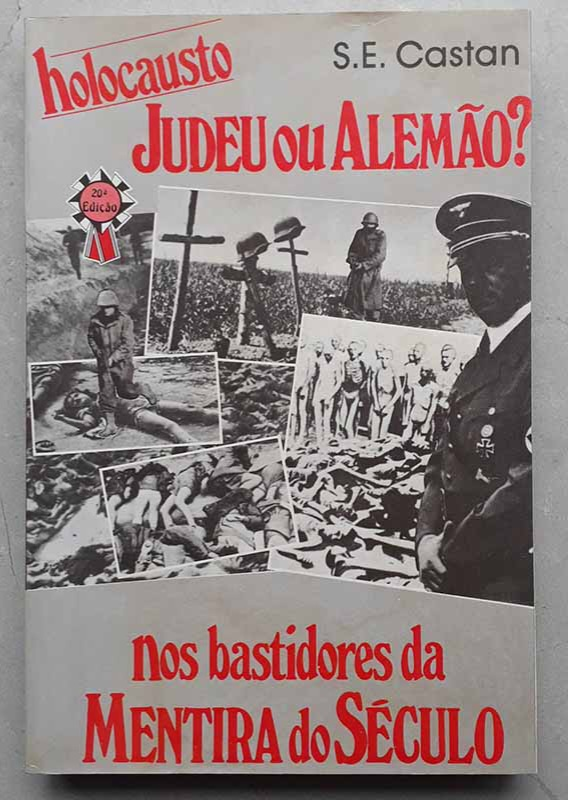
- Born: September 30, 1928; Candelária, Rio Grande do Sul, Brazil
- Died: September 11, 2010 (aged 81); Porto Alegre, Rio Grande do Sul, Brazil
- Occupations: Writer bookseller industrial
- Writing career
- Pen name: S.E.Castan
- Language: Portuguese
- Period: 20th–21st century
- Genre: Holocaust denialism
- Notable works: Holocausto: Judeu ou Alemão? Nos Bastidores da Mentira do Século; Acabou o Gás!... O Fim de um Mito; S.O.S para Alemanha; Verdade sobre o Diálogo Católico-Judaico no Brasil; Inocentes em Nuremberg

Siegfried Ellwanger, who used the pseudonym S.E. Castan, (September 30, 1928 – September 11, 2010) was a Brazilian industrialist, writer and Holocaust denialist bookseller. Ellwanger founded Editora Revisão, which published books that distorted the history of the Jewish genocide, claiming that it was not real. His books are considered anti-Semitic and neo-Nazi. He was denounced for racism by the Public Ministry of Rio Grande do Sul and convicted by the Court of Justice of Rio Grande do Sul. He appealed to the Federal Supreme Court, which upheld the conviction in 2003.

== Books ==
- Holocausto: Judeu ou Alemão? Nos Bastidores da Mentira do Século
- Acabou o Gás!... O Fim de um Mito
- S.O.S para Alemanha
- O Catolicismo Traído: A Verdade sobre o Diálogo Católico-Judaico no Brasil
- Inocentes em Nuremberg

== See also ==
- David Irving
- Deborah Lipstadt
- Denialism
- Holocaust denialism
- Neo-Nazism
- Neo-Nazism in Brazil
- Historical revisionism
