= Brazilian Integralist Action =

Brazilian Integralist Action Ação Integralista Brasileira
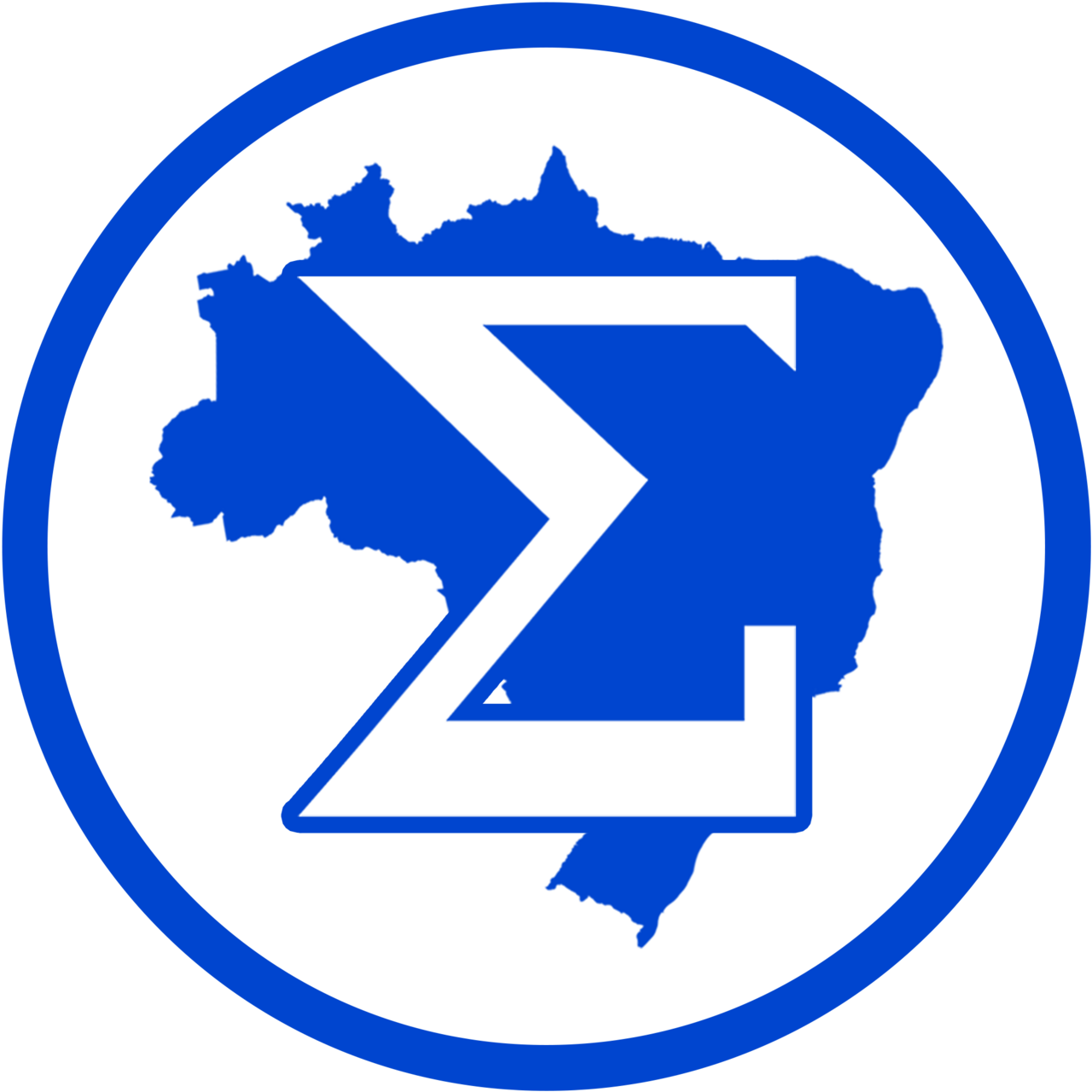
- President: Plínio Salgado
- Founded: October 7, 1932; 94 years ago
- Dissolved: December 2, 1937; 88 years ago
- Succeeded by: Party of Popular Representation
- Headquarters: Rio de Janeiro
- Membership: 600,000–1.2 million
- Ideology: Brazilian Integralism; Brazilian nationalism; Corporate statism; Fascism; National conservatism; Right-wing populism; Spiritualism
- Political position: Far-right
- Religion: Roman Catholicism
- Colours: Blue
- Slogan: "Anauê"
- Anthem: "Avante!" ("Forward!")

Party flag
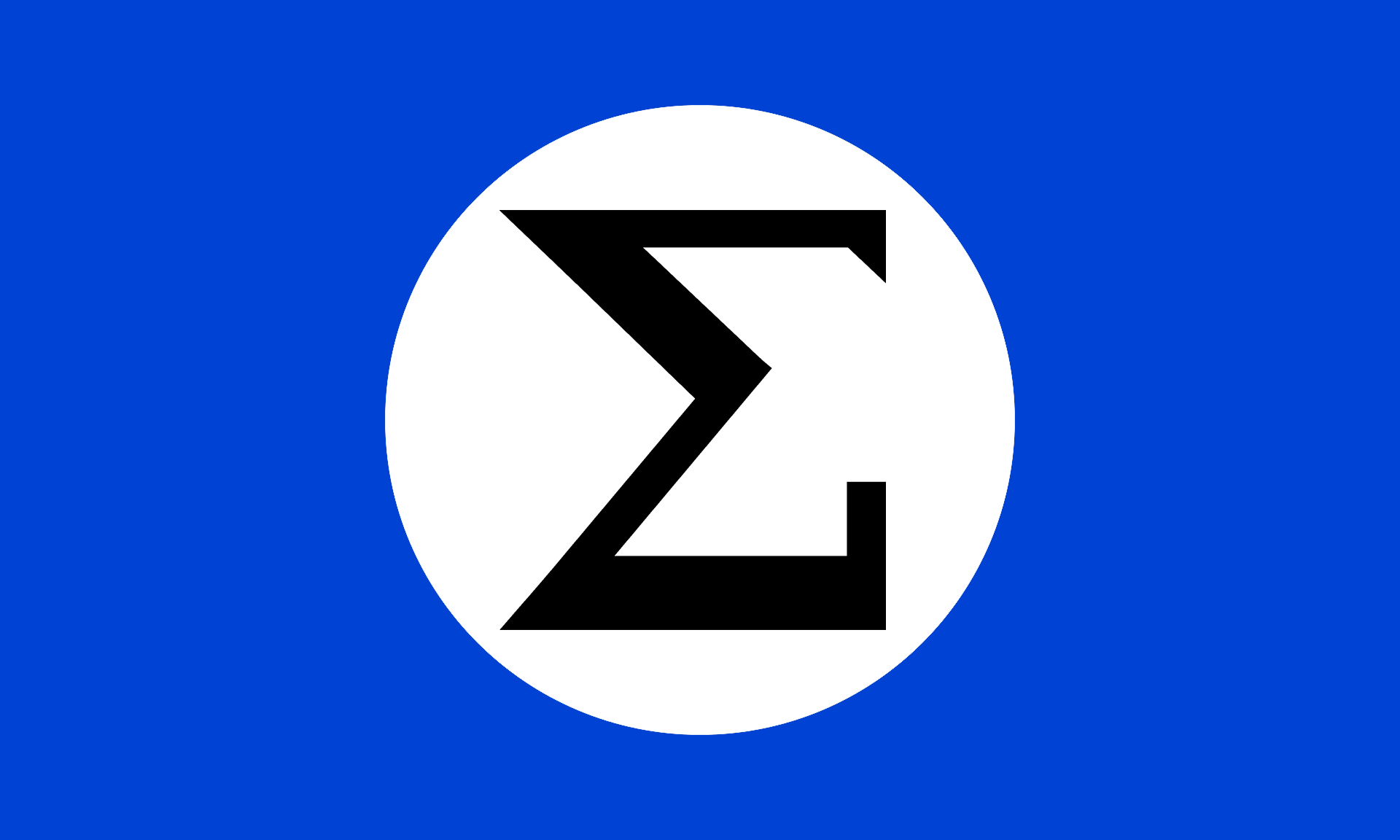

Brazilian Integralist Action (Portuguese: Ação Integralista Brasileira, AIB) was an integralist political party in Brazil. It was based upon the ideology of Brazilian Integralism as developed by its leader Plínio Salgado. Brazilian Integralism supported a revival of spirituality in Brazil, in the form of Brazilian nationalism to form a shared identity between Brazilians. It denounced materialism, liberalism, and Marxism. It was violently opposed to the Communist Party of Brazil and competed with the Communists for the working class vote.

== Character ==
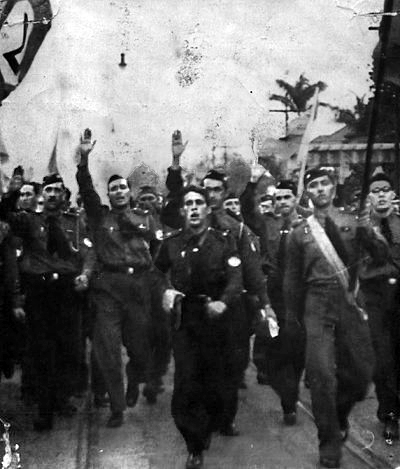
The Integralist salute "Anauê!". It means "you are my brother!" (believed by some to have originated in a Tupi language expression)

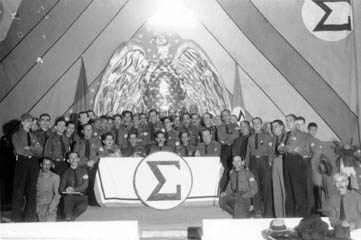
Closing session of the Integralist Congress in Blumenau, 1935

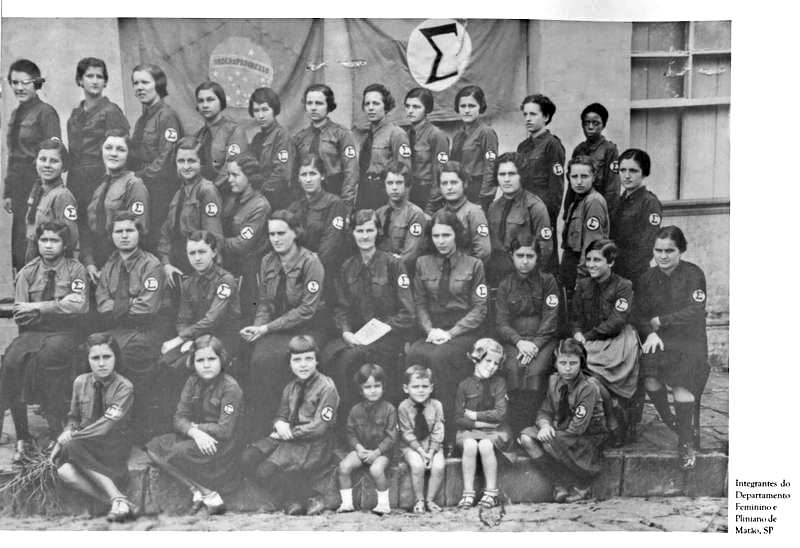
Departamento Feminino e de Juventude (Women and Youth Department).

In its outward forms, Integralism was similar to European fascism: a green-shirted paramilitary organization with uniformed ranks, highly regimented street demonstrations, and rhetoric against Marxism and liberalism. However, it differed markedly from it in specific ideology: a prolific writer before turning political leader, Salgado interpreted human history at large as an opposition between "materialism"—understood by him as the normal operation of natural laws guided by blind necessity—and "spiritualism": the belief in God, in the immortality of the soul, and in the conditioning of individual existence to superior, eternal goals. Salgado advocated, therefore, the harnessing of individual interest to values such as pity, self-donation and concern for others. For him, human history consisted of the eternal struggle of the human spirit against the laws of nature, as expressed by the atheism of modern society in the twin forms of liberalism and socialism—capitalist competition leading eventually to the merger of private capitals in a single state-owned economy. Thus the integralists favoured nationalism as a shared spiritual identity, in the context of a heterogeneous and tolerant nation influenced by "Christian virtues"—such virtues being concretely enforced by means of an authoritarian government enforcing compulsory political activity under the guidance of an acknowledged leader.

The Integralists were something akin to the contemporary Irish Blueshirts who, like them, were revolutionary in spirit, and were an offshoot of the Fenian movement and the IRB, both of which were terrorist organisations condemned repeatedly by the Irish Roman Catholic bishops and excommunicated by Pope Pius IX on 12 October 1869 and 12 January 1870. In particular, they drew support from military officers, especially in the Brazilian Navy.

Integralism being a mass movement, there were marked differences in ideology among its leaders under the influence of various international fascist and quasi-fascist contemporary movements. Gustavo Barroso, the party's chief ideologist after Salgado, was known for his militant antisemitic views, becoming notorious for being the author of the first and so far only Portuguese translation of the Protocols of the Elders of Zion. Barroso was also the author of various antisemitic works of his own (Judaism, Freemasonry, and Communism; Synagogues in São Paulo). This led to at least two serious ruptures in the movement: one in 1935 and the other, 1936, when Salgado almost renounced leadership of the movement.

One of the most important principles in an Integralist's life was the "Internal Revolution", or "Revolution of the Self", through which a man was encouraged to stop thinking only for himself, and instead start to integrate into the idea of a giant integralist family—becoming one with the Homeland, while also leaving behind selfish and "evil" values.

== History ==
=== Attitudes of the Vargas regime ===
In the beginning of the 1930s, Brazil went through a strong wave of political radicalism. The government led by President Getúlio Vargas had a degree of support from workers because of the labor laws he introduced, and competed with the Communist Party of Brazil for working-class support. In the face of communist advances, and at the same time building on his intensive crackdown against the Brazilian left, Vargas turned to the integralist movement as a single mobilized base of right-wing support. With center-left factions excluded from the Vargas' coalition and the left crushed, Vargas progressively set out to co-opt the populist movement to attain the widespread support that allowed him eventually (in 1937) to proclaim his Estado Novo—an integralist "New State".

Integralism, claiming a rapidly growing membership throughout Brazil by 1935, especially among the German-Brazilians and Italian-Brazilians (communities which together amounted to approximately one million people), began filling this ideological void. In 1934, the Integralists targeted the Communist movement led by Luiz Carlos Prestes, mobilizing a conservative mass support base engaging in street brawls. In 1934, following the disintegration of Vargas' delicate alliance with labor, and his new alliance with the AIB, Brazil entered one of the most agitated periods in its political history. Brazil's major cities began to resemble 1932–33 Berlin with its street battles between the Communist Party of Germany and the Nazi Party. Brazilian politics would continue to destabilize as the communists would launch an uprising in 1935.

=== Crackdown and legacy ===
When Vargas established full dictatorial powers under the Estado Novo in 1937, he turned against the movement. Although AIB favored Vargas' hard right turn, Salgado was overly ambitious, with overt presidential aspirations that threatened Vargas' grip on power. In 1938, the Integralists made a last attempt at achieving power, by attacking the Guanabara Palace during the night, but police and army troops arrived at the last minute, and the ensuing gunfight ended with around twenty casualties. This attempt was called the Integralist "Pajama Putsch".

The AIB disintegrated after that failure in 1938, and in 1945 Salgado founded the Party of Popular Representation (PRP), which maintained the ideology of Integralism, but without the uniforms, salutes, signals, and signs. The various political leaderships raised among Integralism dispersed into various ideological positions during subsequent political struggles. Those who maintained ties with the political Right included many of the former members of the participants in the 1964 military coup that was to overthrow President João Goulart. Conversely, other former integralists associated later with the Left, as was to be the case of Goulart's foreign minister Santiago Dantas, the Catholic bishop D. Hélder Câmara. The Brazilian populist leader (and Goulart's brother-in-law) Leonel Brizola, in an early stage of his political career, won the gubernatorial elections in the State of Rio Grande do Sul by means of an electoral alliance with the PRP. Today, there are two groups in Brazil which uphold the strict integralist ideology: the "Frente Integralista Brasileira" (FIB) and the "Movimento Integralista e Linearista Brasileiro" (MIL-B).

=== Integralistas and the military regime (1964–1985) ===
Integralistas and former Integralistas took a range of positions as regards the military right-wing dictatorship that followed the 1964 coup. Plínio Salgado joined the ARENA, the pro-military party. Augusto Rademaker and Márcio Melo, former Integralistas, served as two of the three member junta that briefly ruled Brazil in 1969, during the transition from the second military government (that of Artur da Costa e Silva) to the third (that of Emílio Médici). Rademaker was also vice-president in the third military government. He was generally considered one of the most diehard rightists in the contemporary military topbrass. Many former Integralistas in the military occupied government posts in the second and third military administrations, usually thought to be aligned with hardline sectors in the army. On the other hand, D. Hélder Câmara, also a former Integralista, operated at the time as the best-known opponent of the regime.

== See also ==
- Brazilian Integralist Action Militia

== Sources ==
- Gonçalves, Leandro Pereira; Caldeira Neto, Odilon (2022). Fascism in Brazil: from integralism to Bolsonarism. Routledge studies in fascism and the far right. London ; New York: Routledge Taylor & Francis Group. ISBN 978-1-032-12447-6.
- Winkler, Heinrich August (2015) [2011]. The Age of Catastrophe: A History of the West, 1914–1945. New Haven & London: Yale University Press. ISBN 978-0300-20489-6.
