= Louis Marschalko =

Hungarian writer, poet and journalist (1903–1968)

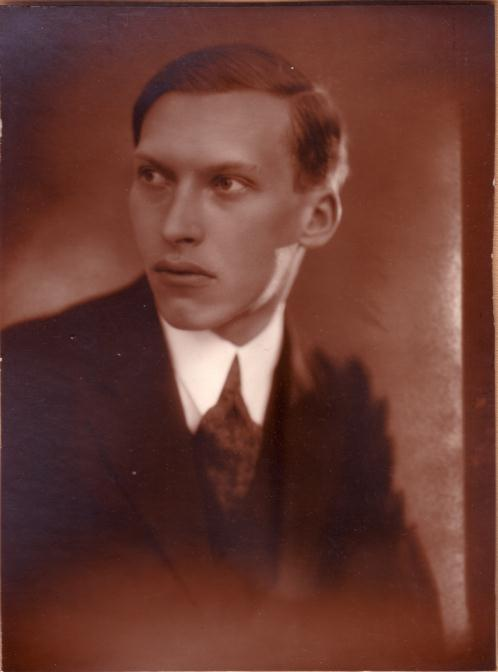
- Born: September 11, 1903; Hajdúböszörmény, Austro-Hungarian Empire
- Died: May 20, 1968 (aged 64); Munich, West Germany
- Occupations: Writer journalist poet
- Writing career
- Language: Hungarian
- Period: 20th century
- Genre: Holocaust denialism
- Notable works: World Conquerors: The Real War Criminals (1958); The Accusatory Gravediggers: The Real Gravediggers of the Hungarian Nation (with Ferenc Fiala) (1958)

Louis Marschalko in Hungarian: Lajos Marschalkó (September 11, 1903 – May 20, 1968) was a Hungarian writer, poet, journalist and Holocaust denialist.

== Family and early career in Hungary ==
His father was Gusztáv Marschalkó, who taught mathematics and physics at the Hajdúböszörmény high school. He was shot in the stomach during World War I, which resulted in his death. His mother, Ágnes Galánffy, was a composer and pianist who moved to Budapest in 1936, where she died in June 1960.

Marschalko began his work in right-wing and far-right newspapers (Fehér Újság and Magyar Jövő). Marschalko then became a staff member of Hajdúföld, and from 1934 he was the editor-in-chief of Debreceni Újság. In 1936 he took up a job in Budapest. He had already published novels in the capital's newspapers, and between 1939 and 1944 Marschalko was an internal staff member of the far-right Fuggeténsz.

== Post-war emigration to Germany ==
After World War II, in 1945, Marschalko fled to Germany. He stayed in Munich and attempted to emigrate to the USA, but his application was denied due to alleged Jewish influence. Marschalko's writings often focused on the role of Jews in Hungary and globally, attributing significant political and social upheaval to Jewish influence.

In 1947, the Hungarian authorities, who were increasingly under communist influence, turned to the Allied Control Commission to extradite him as a war criminal. Since their request was unfounded, it was rejected. Although Marschalko was a radical anti-Semite (and later a Holocaust denier after 1945), he did not belong to any party or organization. The People's Court nevertheless sentenced him to death in absentia. He worked as a manual laborer in a factory in Munich. In addition, Marschalko wrote articles and books at night.

From September 1951 to December 1954, he was a senior contributor to the newspaper Új Magyarság, edited by Zoltán Csűrös and Kálmán R. Ráttkay, and between 1960 and 1962, he was a senior contributor to the Montreal newspaper Összettárás. From 1955, he was a co-editor of the newspaper Új Magyar Jövő. From 1954 Marschalko was the editorial writer of the London newspaper Hídfő, founded by József Süli, and then its editor-in-chief from 1960 until his death. For his work, he received the József Nyírő Prize in 1954. Some of his articles were written under the name Lajos Mátray l, which were published in several emigration newspapers, including the Délamerikai Magyar Hírlap, the Délamerikai Magyarág, the Hungarian Week, the Hungária, the Képes Magyar Világhíradó, the New York Chronicle, the Magyar Egység, the Magyar Nemzet Ifjúság, the Magyar Nők, the Magyarok Útja, the Nyugati Magyarság, the Szittyakürt, the Szabad Magyar Világ, the Szabad Magyarág and the Szabad Nemzet.

In 1960, Marschalko edited the Hídfő Trianoni Almanach, which is one of the outstanding works of literature on the Treaty of Trianon.

== Death ==
He died on May 20, 1968 in Munich. In his tombstone is written: "For God, country and freedom – until death".

== Works ==
- Who Betrayed Hungary in 1918?, Stádium Publishing (1944)
- Alone Against Stalin, Cleveland (1949)
- Red Storm (Memoirs), San Francisco (1954)
- Neutral Hungary! Proposal for a new direction of emigration policy, London (1955)
- World Conquerors: The Real War Criminals (2nd revised edition), Munich (1958)
- The Accusatory Gravediggers: The Real Gravediggers of the Hungarian Nation (with Ferenc Fiala), London (1958)
- Bridgehead Trianon Almanac, Munich (1960)
- Until Death (historical narratives), Munich (1962)
- Conquerors, Munich (1965)
