= Gustavo Barroso =

Brazilian politician (1888–1959)

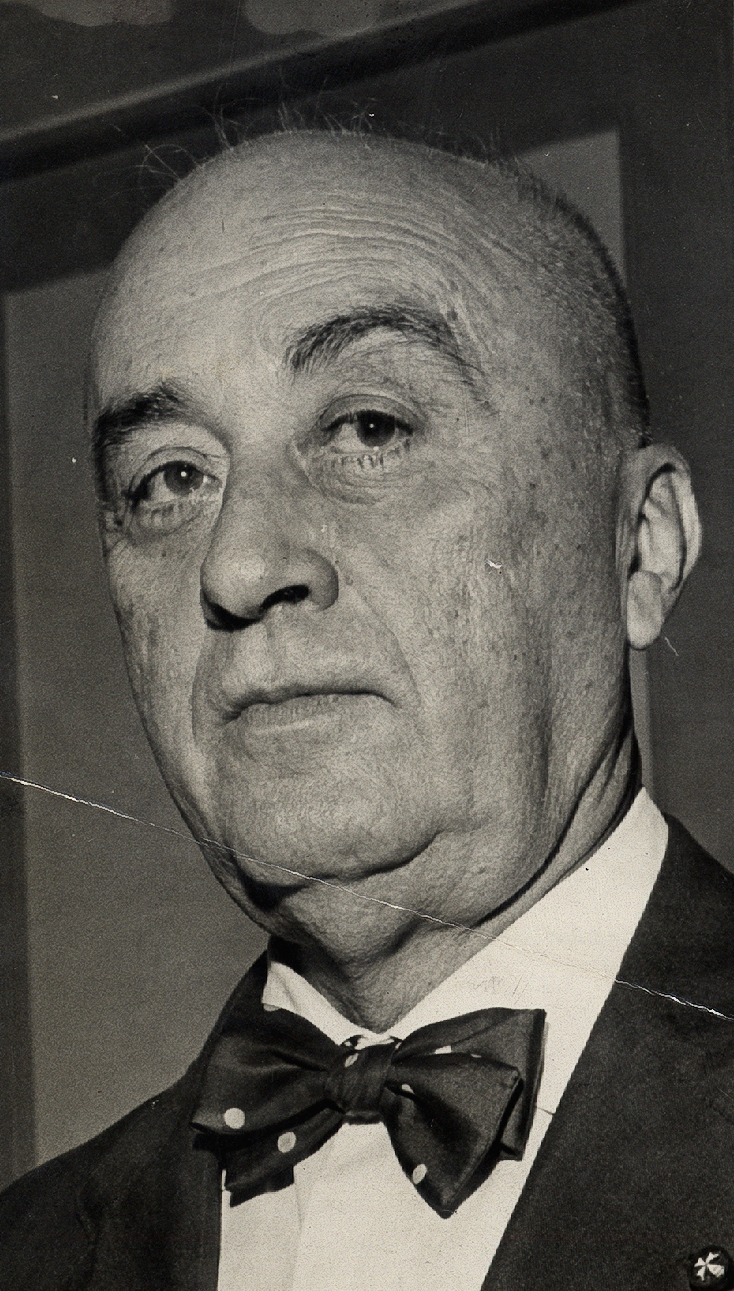
- Barroso in 1958
- Born: 29 December 1888; Fortaleza, Ceará, Empire of Brazil
- Died: 3 December 1959 (aged 70); Rio de Janeiro, Federal District, Brazil
- Education: Federal University of Rio de Janeiro Faculty of Law
- Occupations: Lawyer, professor, politician, museologist, chronicler, essayist, novelist, translator
- Notable work: Brasil, Colônia de Banqueiros
- Political party: Brazilian Integralist Action

Signature
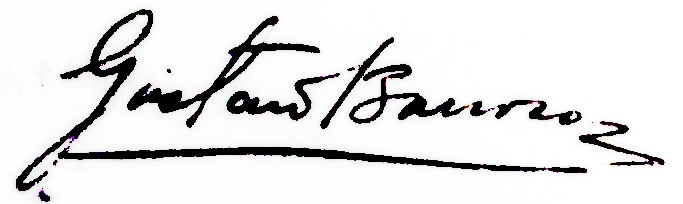

Gustavo Adolfo Luiz Dodt da Cunha Barroso (29 December 1888 – 3 December 1959) was a Brazilian lawyer, historian, writer and politician associated with Brazilian Integralism. He was also known by the pseudonym João do Norte. Considered a master of Brazilian folklore, he was the first director of the National Historical Museum and one of the leaders of the Brazilian Integralist Action, as well as one of its most prominent ideologists. He was a member of the Brazilian Historic and Geographic Institute.

Barroso was an antisemitic intellectual whose ideas were, in certain aspects, close to those of Nazi theorists. A significant portion of the historiography emphasizes that his antisemitism was framed not in racial, but moral term. There are also scholars who affirm that he manifested traditional Catholic forms of antisemitism. He explicitly rejected racial interpretations, positioning himself as an anti-racist writer fighting what he viewed as Jewish racism.

== Early life ==
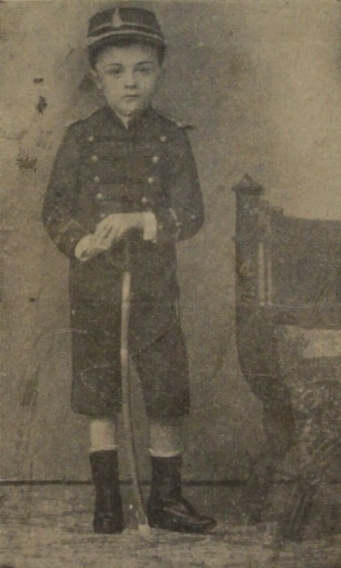
Barroso dressed in military uniform when he was 5 years old, 1894

Barroso was born in Fortaleza, son of Antônio Filinto Barroso and Ana Dodt Barroso, he studied at day schools São José, Partenon Cearense and Liceu do Ceará. He studied at the Faculty of Law of Ceará linked to the Federal University of Ceará (UFC), graduating in 1911 from the Faculty of Law of Rio de Janeiro, currently the National Faculty of Law of the Federal University of Rio de Janeiro (UFRJ). He was half German by birth, his mother coming from Württemberg.

== Later years and antisemitism ==
Barroso made his name as a journalist and was for a time involved with the socialist Clube Maximo Gorki. However, his politics became more conservative after he secured his law degree in Rio de Janeiro in 1910.

He soon became an important figure in the Ceará state, serving variously as Secretary of the Interior and Justice, and being elected a Representative in the National Congress. He even formed part of the Brazilian delegation to the Paris Peace Conference of 1919. He would later rise to hold such positions as president of the Academia Brasileira de Letras (Brazilian Academy of Letters) and secretary-general of the International Committee of Legal Advisers.

In 1933, Barroso joined the Brazilian Integralist Action, which had fascist characteristics. He soon became the head of the extreme anti-Jewish faction within the Brazilian Integralist Action. Noted for his hard-line antisemitism, he took charge of the Brazilian Integralist Action Militia from 1934 to 1936 before being appointed to the party's Supreme Council. An extensive writer, his polemical works at this time included many antisemitic books and newspaper articles in Fon-Fon and Século XX magazines.

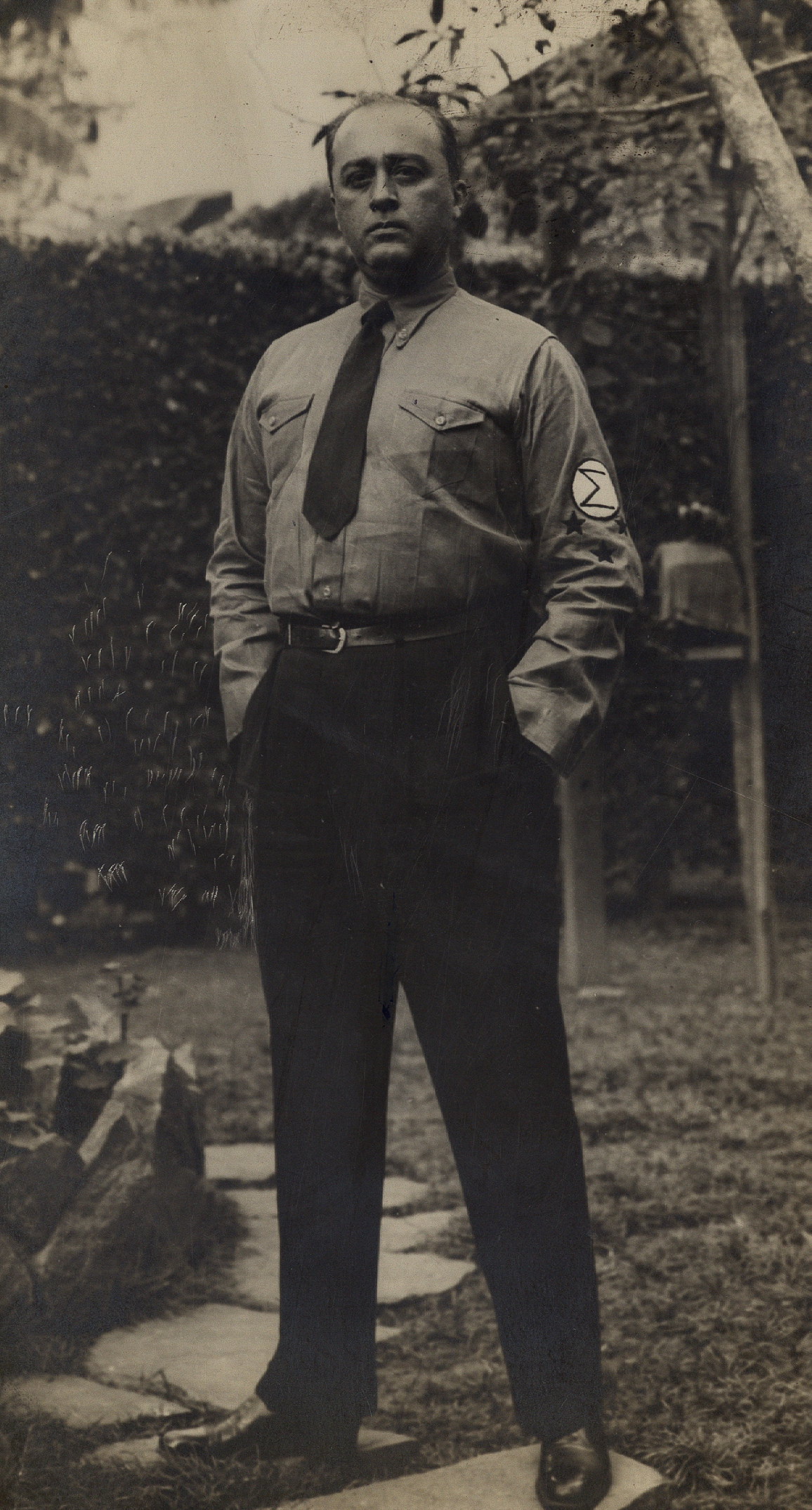
Barroso with the Brazilian Integralist Action uniform, 1933

Political differences caused Barroso to be regarded as dangerous by the more constitutionally minded Integralista party's leader, Plínio Salgado, who suspended him from collaborating for six months with the party's newspaper, A Ofensiva. However Barroso continued to pursue his antisemitic ideals, translating The Protocols of the Elders of Zion into Portuguese and even suggesting setting up concentration camps.

Following the formation of the Estado Novo dictatorship of Getúlio Vargas (1938–1945), Barroso was arrested in 1938 after the Brazilian Integralist Action attempted a violent coup d´etat. However Barroso was never tried due to a lack of evidence of his involvement in the attempted coup. He subsequently left political activism and became largely accepting of Getúlio Vargas later constitutional government (1951–1954), serving as a special ambassador to Uruguay (1952) and Peru (1954). He died in Rio de Janeiro, aged 70.

He was mentioned as a relevant intellectual in a publication that lists extreme-right activists from the whole world. A museum in Fortaleza, his home town, the Museu Gustavo Barroso, bears his name.

== Works ==
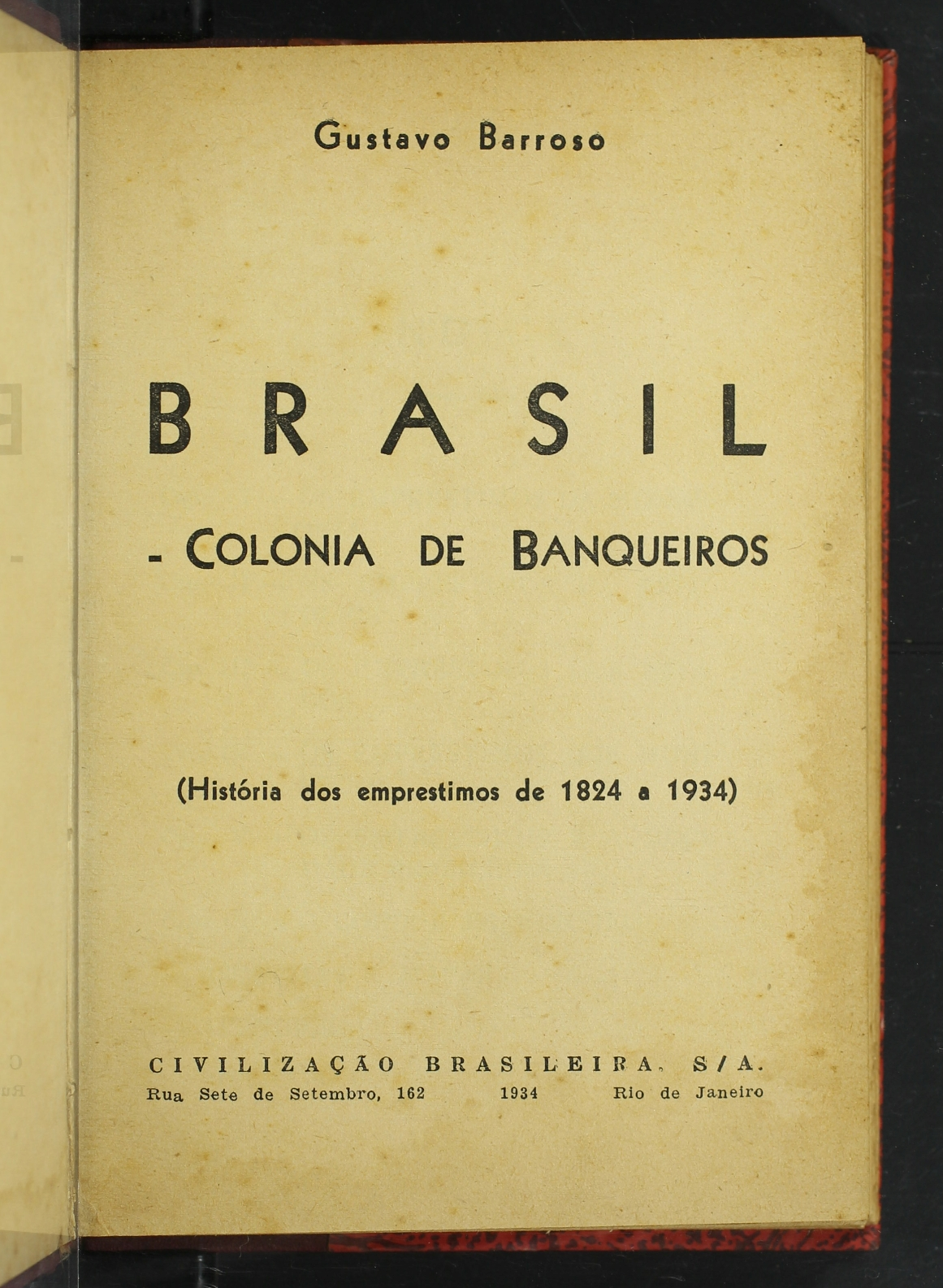
Brasil Colônia de Banqueiros

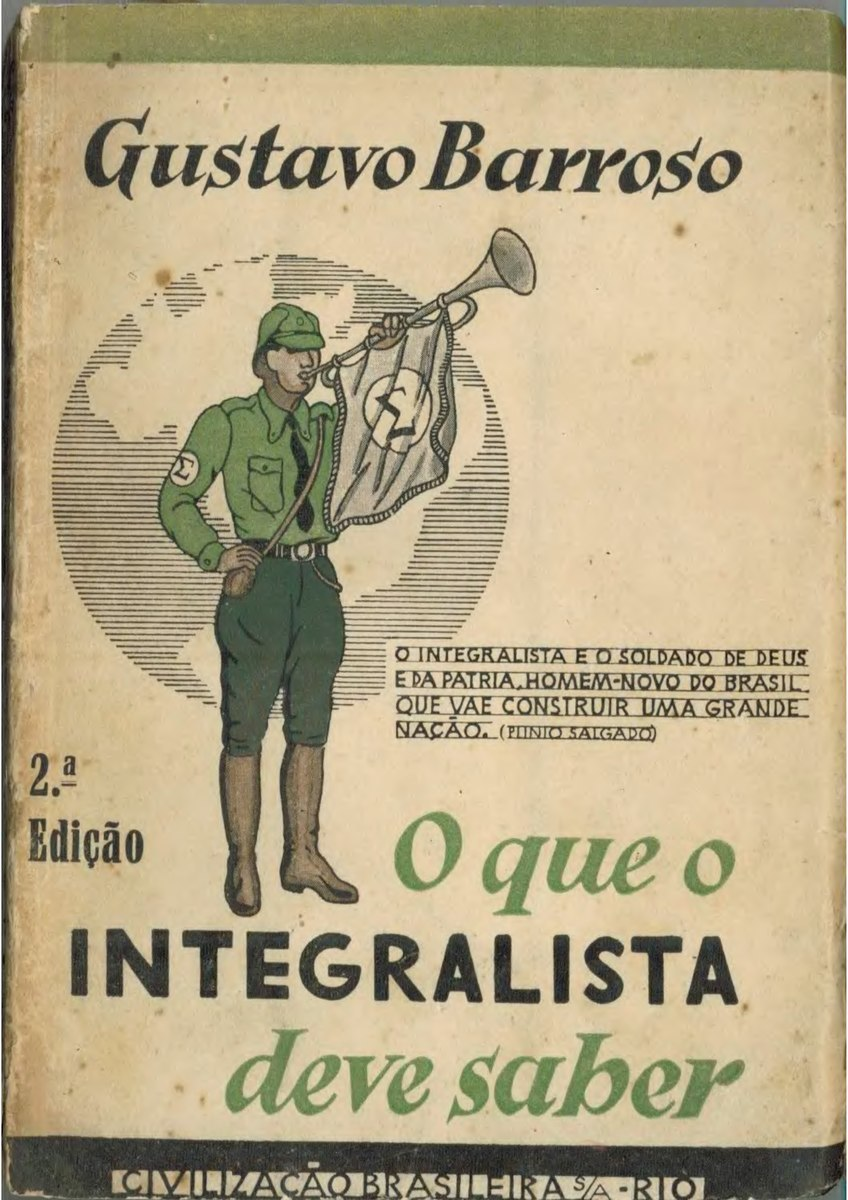
Book

A keen folklorist, Barroso built up a collection of exhibits relating to Brazil's past at the National Historical Museum (Portuguese: Museu Histórico Nacional) in Rio de Janeiro and produced around 50 non-political books including historical and regional novels, folklore studies and biographies of Brazilian national military heroes such as General Osório and Admiral Tamandaré.

As a novelist, he produced the work Terra do Sol (1912), which demonstrated his admiration for the people of northeastern Brazil's rural areas. Barroso was often linked with the neorealist school of Brazilian literature, although he differed from the neorealism typified by the likes of Erico Verissimo, Amando Fontes and Telmo Vergara by his emphasis on rural rather than urban settings. Barroso belonged to the regionalist documentary strand of Brazilian neorealism, although, along with Mário Sete, he rejected the inherent modernism in the works of contemporaries in the genre such as Jorge Luis de Rêgo and Jorge Amado.

He also published a few works on Lampião, besides the aforementioned Terra do Sol, also Herois e Bandidos (1917) and Alma de Lama e de Aço (1928).

As a political writer, his polemical works when joined to the Brazilian Integralist Action included O Liceu do Ceará, Brasil: Colônia de Banqueiros and História Secreta do Brasil. He also translated The Protocols of the Elders of Zion into Portuguese.

As Brazil had relatively few Jews by then, Barroso's antisemitic writings tended to focus on the international conspiracy theory of Jewish world control, as espoused notably in his book The Paulista Synagogue.

== Bibliography ==
- Barroso, Gustavo (1937). Judaismo, maçonaria e comunismo (in Portuguese). Rio de Janeiro: Civilização Brasileira.
- Caldeira Neto, Odilon (2013). "Gustavo Barroso e o esquecimento: integralismo, antissemitismo e escrita de si". Cadernos do Tempo Presente (in Portuguese). 2013 (14): 44–56. ISSN 2179-2143. Wikidata Q107332393.
- Cascudo, Luís da Câmara (1962). Dicionário do Folclore Brasileiro (in Portuguese). Rio de Janeiro: Instituto Nacional do Livro.
- Coutinho, Afrânio (1969). An Introduction to Literature in Brazil. Translated by Rabassa, Gregory. Columbia University Press.
- Gonçalves, Leandro Pereira; Caldeira Neto, Odilon (2022). Fascism in Brazil: From Integralism to Bolsonarism. Abington, New York City: Routledge. doi:10.4324/9781003224570. ISBN 978-1-000-58198-0. LCCN 2021055578. OCLC 1289618190. OL 36276854M. Wikidata Q118985841.
- Grunspan-Jasmin, Elise (2006). Lampião, senhor do sertão : vidas e mortes de um cangaceiro (in Portuguese). São Paulo: Editora da Universidade de São Paulo. ISBN 85-314-0913-6. OCLC 82929182.
- Rees, Philip (1990). Biographical dictionary of the extreme right since 1890. New York: Simon & Schuster. ISBN 0-13-089301-3. OCLC 22347303.
