= 1934 Brazilian legislative election =

Legislative elections were held in Brazil on 14 October 1934 to elect members of the Chamber of Deputies and state legislatures.

== Background ==
Following the Revolution of 1930, a constitutional assembly was elected in 1933 and drew up a new constitution, which came into force on 16 July 1934. It provided for a federal state with a bicameral parliament consisting of a 300-member Chamber of Deputies (of which 250 were directly elected and 50 selected by union and employer bodies) and a Senate consisting of two members from each state, who would be elected by state legislatures.

After the constitution was promulgated, the Assembly was converted into a Chamber of Deputies and elected Getúlio Vargas as president the following day.

== Electoral system ==
The 250 directly elected members were elected by open list proportional representation, with states acting as constituencies. Voters could cast preferential votes for candidates from multiple parties.

== Results ==
Of the 250 elected members, 142 were supporters of Vargas, 76 were from the opposition and 32 were independents.

Party	Seats
Progressive Party	35
Social Democratic Party	30
São Paulo Constitutionalist Party	22
Social Democratic Party of Pernambuco	15
Liberal Republican Party	14
Paulista Republican Party	12
Mineiro Republican Party	11
Republican Party	10
Fluminense Progressive Union	9
United Front	8
Catholic Electoral League	8
Autonomist Party	8
Governor Captain Octavia Mangabeira	7
Pará Liberal Party	7
Radical People's Party	5
Catarinense Liberal Party	4
Socialist National Party	4
Pelo Amazonas Redimido	4
Mato Grosso Evolutionist Party	3
People's Party	3
Republican Social Party	3
Republican Union	3
Alliance for Santa Catarina	2
Social Alliance	2
Chapa Popular	2
Pernambucana Dissidents	2
Paraense United Front	2
Fluminense Socialist Party	2
Libertarian Union	2
Libertarian Coalition	1
Piauhyense Coalition	1
Agriculture Party	1
Fluminense Evolutionary Party	1
Mato Grossense Liberal Party	1
National Party	1
Libertarian Republican Party	1
Nationalist Social Party	1
Progressive Republicans	1
Maranhense Republican Union	1
Paranaense Republican Union	1
Indirectly elected members	50
Total	300
Source: TSE

== Elected Federal Deputies ==
State	Federal Deputy	Party
Acre	Alberto Augusto Diniz	People's Slate
Acre	José Tomás da Cunha Vasconcelos	People's Slate
Alagoas	Antônio de Melo Machado	Republican Party of Alagoas
Alagoas	Armando Sampaio Costa	Republican Party of Alagoas
Alagoas	Carlos Cavalcanti de Gusmão	Republican Party of Alagoas
Alagoas	José Afonso Valente de Lima	Republican Party of Alagoas
Alagoas	Orlando Valeriano de Araújo	Republican Party of Alagoas
Alagoas	Rodolfo Pinto da Mota Lima	Republican Party of Alagoas
Alagoas	Fernandes Lima	National Party of Alagoas
Alagoas	Emílio Eliseu de Maya	Catholic Electoral League
Amazonas	Alfredo Augusto da Mata	For the Redeemed Amazonas
Amazonas	Ribeiro Júnior	For the Redeemed Amazonas
Amazonas	Álvaro Maia	For the Redeemed Amazonas
Amazonas	Leopoldo Tavares da Cunha Melo	For the Redeemed Amazonas
Bahia	Alfredo Pereira Mascarenhas	Social Democratic Party of Bahia
Bahia	Altamirando Requião	Social Democratic Party of Bahia
Bahia	Antônio Garcia de Medeiros Neto	Social Democratic Party of Bahia
Bahia	Arnold Ferreira da Silva	Social Democratic Party of Bahia
Bahia	Artur Neiva	Social Democratic Party of Bahia
Bahia	Attila Ferreira do Amaral	Social Democratic Party of Bahia
Bahia	Clemente Mariani	Social Democratic Party of Bahia
Bahia	Francisco Joaquim da Rocha	Social Democratic Party of Bahia
Bahia	Francisco Peixoto de Magalhães Neto	Social Democratic Party of Bahia
Bahia	Francisco Prisco de Sousa Paraíso (son)	Social Democratic Party of Bahia
Bahia	João da Costa Pinto Dantas	Social Democratic Party of Bahia
Bahia	João Marques dos Reis	Social Democratic Party of Bahia
Bahia	João Pacheco de Oliveira (politician)	Social Democratic Party of Bahia
Bahia	Lauro de Almeida Passos	Social Democratic Party of Bahia
Bahia	Manuel Leôncio Galrão	Social Democratic Party of Bahia
Bahia	Manoel Cavalcanti Novaes	Social Democratic Party of Bahia
Bahia	Rafael Sincorá de Andrade	Social Democratic Party of Bahia
Bahia	João Mangabeira	Governor Otávio Mangabeira List
Bahia	J. J. Seabra	Governor Otávio Mangabeira List
Bahia	Luís Viana Filho	Governor Otávio Mangabeira List
Bahia	Otávio Mangabeira	Governor Otávio Mangabeira List
Bahia	Pedro Calmon	Governor Otávio Mangabeira List
Bahia	Pedro Lago	Governor Otávio Mangabeira List
Bahia	Rafael de Menezes Silva	Governor Otávio Mangabeira List
Ceará	Jeová Motta	Catholic Electoral League
Ceará	José Antônio de Figueiredo Rodrigues	Catholic Electoral League
Ceará	Olavo Oliveira	Catholic Electoral League
Ceará	Pedro Firmeza	Catholic Electoral League
Ceará	Monte Arrais	Catholic Electoral League
Ceará	Humberto Rodrigues de Andrade	Catholic Electoral League
Ceará	Waldemar Falcão	Catholic Electoral League
Ceará	Demócrito Rocha	Social Democratic Party of Ceara
Ceará	José de Borba	Social Democratic Party of Ceara
Ceará	Manuel Fernandes Távora	Social Democratic Party of Ceara
Ceará	Plínio Pompeu	Social Democratic Party of Ceara
Federal District	Antônio Máximo Nogueira Penido	Autonomist Party of Federal District
Federal District	Augusto do Amaral Peixoto	Autonomist Party of Federal District
Federal District	Cândido Pessoa Cavalcanti de Albuquerque	Autonomist Party of Federal District
Federal District	Ernesto Pereira Carneiro	Autonomist Party of Federal District
Federal District	Francisco Antônio Rodrigues de Sales Filho	Autonomist Party of Federal District
Federal District	Henrique Lage	Autonomist Party of Federal District
Federal District	Júlio Oscar de Novaes Carvalho	Autonomist Party of Federal District
Federal District	Manuel Caldeira de Alvarenga	Autonomist Party of Federal District
Federal District	Henrique Dodsworth	United Front
Federal District	Sampaio Correia	United Front
Espírito Santo	Asdrúbal Martins Soares	Social Democratic Party of Espírito Santo
Espírito Santo	Francisco Gonçalves	Social Democratic Party of Espírito Santo
Espírito Santo	Jair Tovar	Social Democratic Party of Espírito Santo
Espírito Santo	Ubaldo Ramalhete Maia	Farmers' Party of Espírito Santo
Goiás	Claro Augusto de Godói	Social Republican Party (Brazil)
Goiás	Laudelino Gomes de Almeida	Social Republican Party (Brazil)
Goiás	Vicente Miguel da Silva Abreu	Social Republican Party (Brazil)
Goiás	Domingos Vellasco	Liberator Coalition

== Acre ==
=== Federal Deputy ===
Party	Votes	%	Seats	+/–
People's Slate	2,291		2	0
Acrean Legion	2,267		0	0
Total			2	–
Total votes	4,033	–		
Registered voters/turnout	5,130	78.62		

== Alagoas ==
=== Federal Deputy ===
Party	Votes	%	Seats	+/–
Republican Party of Alagoas	10,595		6	New
National Party of Alagoas	3,024		1	-5
Catholic Electoral League			1	New
Integralist List			0	New
Total			8	–
Total votes	18,338	–		
Registered voters/turnout	34,780	52.73		

=== State Deputy ===
Party	Votes	%	Seats
Republican Party of Alagoas	10,718		24
National Party of Alagoas	2,867		4
Integralist List	338		1
Catholic Electoral League			0
Independent			1
Total			30
Total votes	18,338	–	
Registered voters/turnout	34,780	52.73	

== Amazonas ==
=== Federal Deputy ===
Party	Votes	%	Seats
For the Redeemed Amazonas	4,786		4
Amazonian Labor Party	1,220		0
Republican Party of Amazonas	572		0
Liberal Party of Amazonas	66		0
Total			4
Total votes	8,330	–	
Registered voters/turnout	9,884	84.28	

=== State Deputy ===
Party	Votes	%	Seats
For the Redeemed Amazonas	4,337		24
Amazonian Labor Party	1,124		4
Republican Party of Amazonas	604		2
Liberal Party of Amazonas	121		0
Everything for Amazonas	52		0
Amazonas List	1		0
Total			30
Total votes	8,330	–	
Registered voters/turnout	9,884	84.28	

== Bahia ==
=== Federal Deputy ===
Party	Votes	%	Seats
Social Democratic Party of Bahia			17
Governor Otávio Mangabeira List			7
Total			24
Total votes	147,560	–	
Registered voters/turnout	185,483	79.55	
