= Vargas era =

1930–1946 period of government in Brazil

- 1930–1946
First Brazilian Republic	Fourth Brazilian Republic
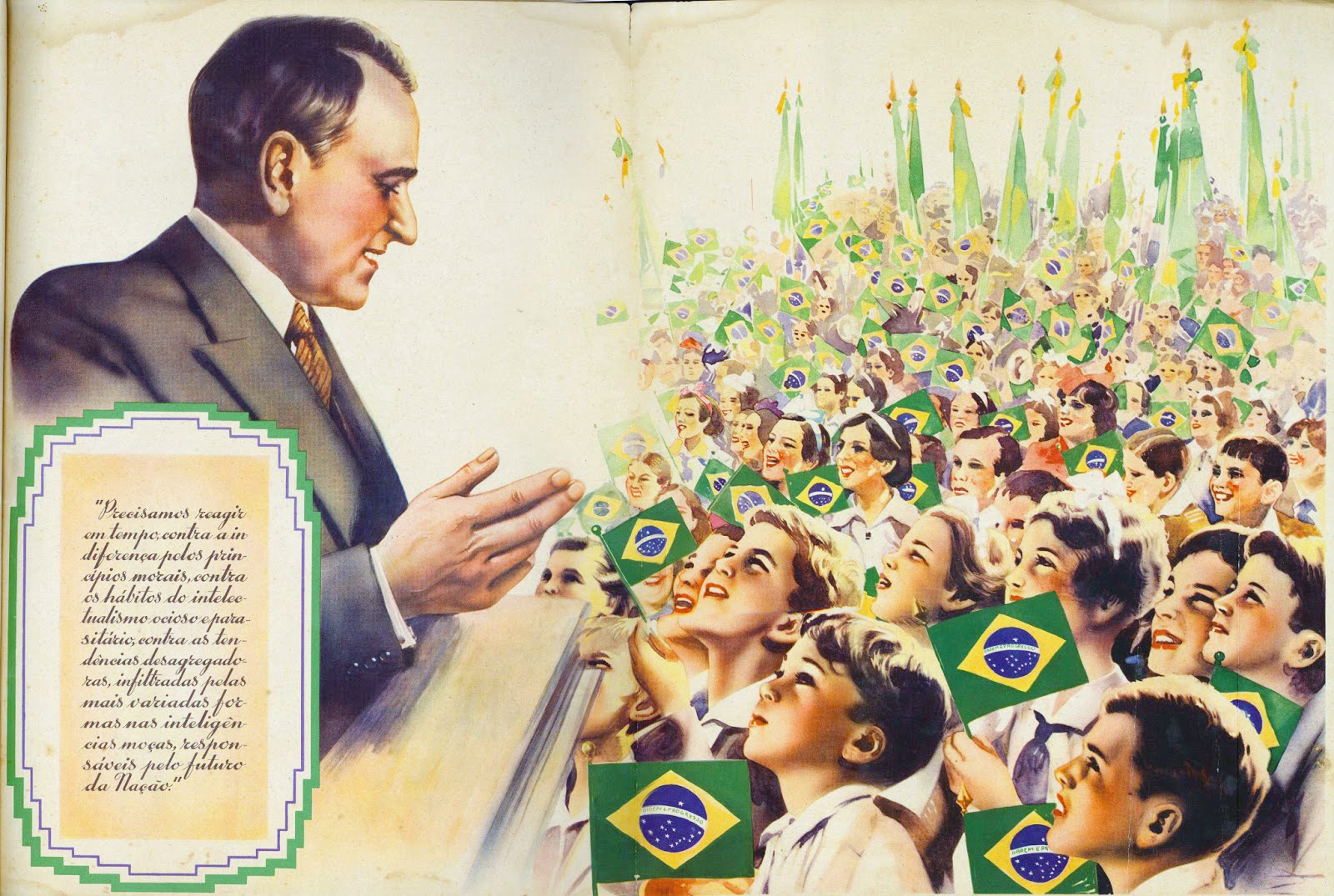
- Estado Novo propaganda
- Including: Second Brazilian Republic; Estado Novo
- President(s): Getúlio Vargas (1930–1945); José Linhares (1945–1946)
- Key events: Revolution of 1930; Constitutionalist Revolution; Communist Uprising; 1937 coup d'état Integralist putsch Brazil in World War II; Ousting of Getúlio Vargas

In Brazil's history, the Vargas era (Portuguese: Era Vargas; Portuguese pronunciation: [ˈɛɾɐ ˈvaʁɡɐs]) was the period from 1930 to 1946 when the country was governed by Getúlio Vargas. The period can be subdivided into the Second Brazilian Republic, from 1930 to 1937, and the Third Brazilian Republic, or Estado Novo, from 1937 to 1946.

The Revolution of 1930 marked the end of the First Brazilian Republic. The coup deposed President Washington Luís and blocked the swearing-in of president-elect Júlio Prestes on the grounds that the 1930 election had been rigged by his supporters. The 1891 Constitution was abrogated, the National Congress dissolved, and the provisional military junta ceded power to Vargas. Federal intervention in state governments increased, and the country's political landscape was altered by suppressing the traditional oligarchies of the states of São Paulo and Minas Gerais.

After assuming power, Vargas governed by decree as head of the provisional government instituted by the revolution from 1930 to 1934, before the adoption of a new constitution. Following the adoption of the Constitution of 1934, which was drafted and approved by the National Constituent Assembly of 1933–1934, Vargas was elected by Congress and governed as president with a democratically elected legislature. Vargas' presidency was to end in 1938, however, in order to stay in power, he imposed a new dictatorial constitution in a coup d'état and shut down the legislature to rule Brazil as a dictator, thus initiating the Estado Novo.

The ousting of Vargas and the Estado Novo regime in 1945 led to the restoration of democracy in Brazil with the adoption of a new democratic constitution in 1946, marking the end of the Vargas era and the beginning of the Fourth Brazilian Republic.

== Fall of the First Republic ==
The tenente rebellions did not significantly impact the bourgeois social reformers in Brazil. However, the entrenched ruling coffee oligarchy was vulnerable during the economic upheaval of 1929.

Brazil's vulnerability in the Great Depression was rooted in the dependence of its economy on foreign markets and loans. Despite some industrial development in São Paulo, coffee and other agricultural exports were the mainstay of the economy.

Days after the U.S. stock market crash on 29 October 1929, coffee prices fell. Between 1929 and 1931, coffee prices fell from 22.5 cents per pound to eight cents per pound. As world trade contracted, coffee exporters experienced a large drop in foreign-exchange earnings.

The Great Depression had a dramatic effect on Brazil. The collapse of Brazil's valorization (price support) program, a safety net in times of economic crisis, was intertwined with the collapse of the central government and its base of support in the landed oligarchy; the coffee planters had become dangerously dependent on government support. The government was not short of cash needed to bail out the coffee industry after the post-World War I recession, but world demand for Brazil's primary products had fallen too drastically between 1929 and 1930 to maintain government revenues. The country's gold reserves had been depleted by the end of 1930, pushing its exchange rate down to a new low, and the program for warehoused coffee collapsed.

The government of president Washington Luís faced a deepening balance-of-payments crisis, and the coffee growers had an unsellable harvest. Since power rested in a patronage system, wide-scale disruptions of the delicate balance of regional interests left the Luís regime vulnerable. Government policies favoring foreign interests exacerbated the crisis, leaving the regime alienated from almost every segment of society. After the Wall Street panic, the government tried to please foreign creditors by maintaining convertibility according to the principles of foreign bankers and economists who set the terms for Brazil's relations with the world economy; this had no support from any major sector of Brazilian society.

Luís clung to a hard money policy despite capital flight, guaranteeing the convertibility of the Brazilian currency into gold or British sterling. The government was forced to suspend currency convertibility when its gold and sterling reserves were exhausted amid the collapse of the valorization program, and foreign credit evaporated.

Washington Luís's decision to choose Júlio Prestes as his successor precipitated the fall of the First Republic, as Prestes was, like him, from São Paulo, which broke the traditional rotation of the presidency between São Paulo and Minas Gerais.

== Rise of Getúlio Vargas ==
A populist governor of Brazil's southernmost Rio Grande do Sul state, Vargas was a cattle rancher with a doctorate in law and was the 1930 presidential candidate of the Liberal Alliance. A member of the local landed oligarchy who rose through the system of patronage and clientelism, he had a fresh vision of how Brazilian politics could be shaped to support national development. Vargas came from a region with a positivist and populist tradition, and was an economic nationalist who favored industrial development and liberal reforms, built up political networks and was attuned to the interests of the rising urban classes. He relied on the support of the tenentes of the 1922 rebellion.

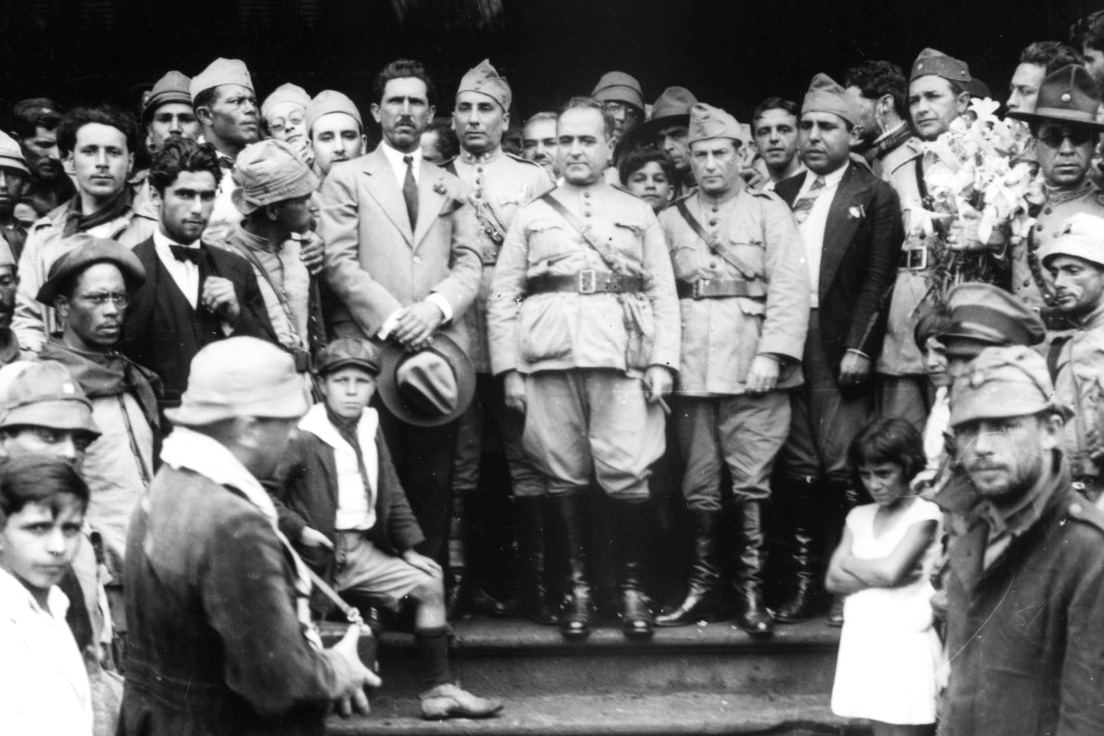
Vargas after the 1930 revolution which began the Vargas era

With the urban bourgeois groups, northeastern sugar barons had a legacy of longstanding grievances against the southern coffee oligarchs. Northeastern landowners opposed Washington Luís' 1930 discontinuance of Artur Bernardes' drought-relief projects. The decay of the northeast sugar oligarchies began dramatically with the severe drought of 1877, combined with the rapid growth of coffee-producing São Paulo. After the abolition of slavery in 1888, Brazil saw a mass exodus of emancipated slaves and other peasants from the northeast to the southeast, ensuring a steady supply of cheap labor for the coffee planters.

Under the Old Republic, Brazil's presidency was dominated by the southeastern states of São Paulo and Minas Gerais (Brazil's largest, demographically and economically) in the so-called café com leite ("coffee with milk") politics. Given the grievances with the ruling regime in the northeast and Rio Grande do Sul, Vargas chose João Pessoa of the northeastern state of Paraíba as his vice-presidential candidate in the 1930 presidential election.

As a candidate in 1930, Vargas utilized populist rhetoric to promote middle-class concerns, opposing the primacy (but not the legitimacy) of the São Paulo coffee oligarchy and the landed elites who had little interest in protecting and promoting industry. Behind the façade of Vargas' populism lay the ever-changing nature of his coalition. Locally-dominant regional groups – the gaúchos of Rio Grande do Sul and the sugar barons of the northeast – ushered the new urban groups into the forefront of Brazilian political life, tilting the balance of the central government toward the Liberal Alliance.

Vargas understood that with the breakdown of relations between workers and owners in Brazil's growing factories, workers could become the basis for a new form of political power: populism. He gradually established mastery of the Brazilian political world, and remained in power for 15 years. As the stranglehold of the agricultural elites eased, urban industrial leaders acquired more influence nationally and the middle class strengthened.

In addition to the Great Depression and the emergence of the Brazilian bourgeoisie, the country's inter-regional politics encouraged the alliance Vargas forged during the Revolution of 1930 between the new urban sectors and landowners hostile to the government in states other than São Paulo.

== Second Brazilian Republic ==
Vargas' tenuous coalition lacked a coherent program beyond a broad vision of "modernization". He tried to reconcile the divergent interests of his supporters with social reform between 1930 and 1934, with his policies increasingly reliant on populism.

=== The tenentes ===
In the first year of the Vargas regime, the tenentes, the dominant forces of Vargas' inner circle, attempted to differentiate themselves from the dissident oligarchical politicians of the Old Republic, as well as other sectors of the new government by branding themselves as the "true revolutionaries". The tenentes formed, in February 1931, the '3rd of October Club' aiming to link civilian and military tenentes. Many members of Vargas' government were also members of the club, such as Góis Monteiro (1st President of the club), Oswaldo Aranha, and Juarez Távora. Leading intellectuals like Francisco de Oliveira Viana were added to the club shortly after as well. The tenentes had considerable influence over the Vargas's regime in its first years. The 3rd of October Club had veto powers they could use against Getúlio Vargas, which were used several times against the various appointments of state intervenors. The tenentes also formed a revolutionary legion with branches in many states in order to spread their revolutionary ideas. The legions' first major parade in São Paulo had noticeable fascist undertones.

The tenentes also played a key role in influencing economic policy, like supporting state intervention in the support of coffee, and also encouraging a shift from export to non-export agriculture and industry. They also influenced social policy, supporting state intervention in trade unions to promote their growth, and to extend welfare measures to workers and their family.

Eventually, the tenentes lost their influence due to their growing reliance on Getulio Vargas and their lack of deep rooted connections with most of Brazilian society. They also did not have a coherent ideology and never had a cohesive plan for government even if they were to take over Vargas's government. The October 3rd Club was disbanded in 1935 as the result of internal ideological conflict.

=== Economy ===
Vargas sought to bring Brazil out of the Great Depression through statist policies which satisfied the demands of the rapidly-growing urban bourgeois groups voiced by the new (to Brazil) ideologies of populism and nationalism. His first steps (like Roosevelt's) focused on economic stimulus, with which all factions could agree. Favoring a policy of tax breaks and import quotas to expand the country's industrial base, Vargas linked his pro-middle class policies to nationalism. He sought to mediate disputes between labor and capital, quelling a paulista female-workers' strike by co-opting much of their platform and requiring government mediation in the future.

With the northeastern oligarchies now incorporated into the ruling coalition, the government focused on restructuring agriculture. To placate friendly agrarian oligarchs, the state left the impoverished domains of the rural oligarchs untouched and helped the sugar barons cement their control of rural Brazil. The peasantry, surprising many accustomed to overlooking Brazil's peripheral regions, was not that servile. Banditry was common but so were messianism, anarchistic uprisings, and tax evasion, all common practice before 1930. The government crushed a wave of banditry in the northeast which was known as cangaço, reversing the drastic (but gradual) decline of the northeastern latifundios from the 1870s to the 1930 revolution. At the expense of the indigent peasantry—85 percent of the workforce—Vargas reneged on his promises of land reform and denied agricultural workers the working-class gains in labor regulations. Opposition arose among the powerful paulista coffee oligarchs to this intervention and to increasing government centralization, its increasingly populist and fascist stances, its protectionist and mercantilist policies (protecting politically favored producers at the expense of consumers), and the increasingly-dictatorial Vargas himself.

The appeasement of landed interests (traditionally dominant forces in Brazil) required a realignment of Vargas' coalition, forcing him to turn against its left wing. The influence of the tenentes group over Vargas rapidly waned after mid-1932, although individual moderate tenentes continued to hold important positions in the regime. The ouster of the center-left tenentes from his coalition marked his rightward shift by 1934.

=== Labor ===
Various reforms aimed at improving working conditions were introduced during the course of the Second Brazilian Republic. A decree of the 11th of November 1930, which was later supplemented by a decree of January 1934, introduced paid holidays for trade union members of industry, while under a decree of August 1933 employees in commercial establishments and banks became entitled to 15 days of paid holiday a year. A decree of March 1931 empowered trade associations to define conditions of industrial hygiene, while an earlier decree from November the 27th 1930 dealt with (as noted by one study) “the improvement of health conditions in industrial establishments.” In 1931 and 1932, mandatory social security was extended to mineworkers and to those employed by undertakings in concessionee public services, and in 1933 a social security scheme was set (as noted by one study) “in favour of wage-earners in undertakings concerned with sea, river and lake navigation.” A decree of March 1932 provided for equal pay, prohibited the employment of women between the times of 10pm and 5am and also the employment of women in certain dangerous occupations, and also provided for paid maternity leave. Decree No. 21,364 of May 1932 fixed 8 hours as the normal daily hours for salaried employees and manual workers in industrial undertakings, while further decrees were made in 1933 that extended the 8-hour workday to additional occupational groups.

A decree of November 1932 regulated the employment of young people in industry, such as by prohibiting (with certain exceptions) night work for young people under the age 18 and also the employment of young people between the ages of 14 and 18 in certain specified unhealthy or dangerous industries. A decree of January 1934 provided for land transportation workers to have a weekly rest of 24 consecutive hours. In July 1934, health and safety regulations were issued, while a decree of May 1934 established a Directorate for the protection of maternity and childhood. This was an independent institution that was intended (as noted by one study) “to promote such protection throughout the whole country.” A law of June 1935 provided employees in commerce or industry with compensation when (as noted by one study) “there is no stipulated term for the termination of their employment contract and when they are dismissed without just cause, and provides other measures.” An Act of March 1936 provided for compensation for occupational diseases, while an Act of January 1936 provided for the establishment of minimum wage-fixing committees, declaring that every employee “shall be entitled as payment for services rendered to a minimum wage sufficient to satisfy his normal needs as regards food, housing, clothing, health and transport in specified districts of the Republic and for specified periods of time.” Also in 1936, national social security for industrial workers was established.

=== Towards dictatorship ===
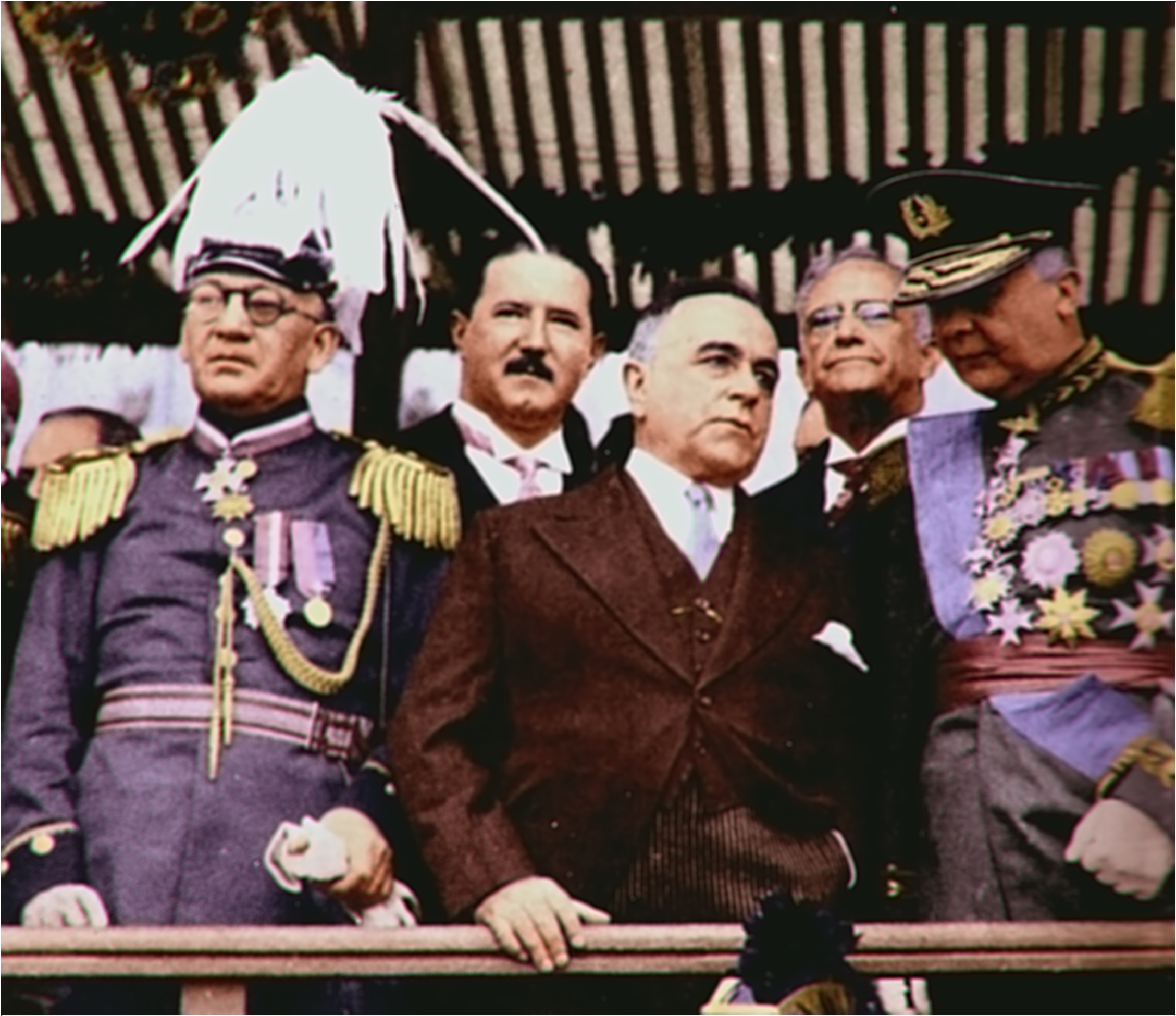
Vargas (center) at a commemoration of the 50th anniversary of the Proclamation of the Republic, 15 November 1939

Vargas copied fascist tactics, and shared fascism's rejection of liberal capitalism. He abandoned the provisional government (1930–34) characterized by social reform that appeared to favor the left wing of his revolutionary coalition, the tenentes.

A conservative insurgency in 1932 was the turning point to the right. After the July Constitutionalist Revolution — a thinly veiled attempt by the paulista coffee oligarchs to retake the central government — Vargas tried to recover support from the landed elites (including the coffee growers) to establish a new alliance.

The revolt was caused by Vargas' appointment of João Alberto, a center-left tenente, as an interventor (provisional governor) in place of the elected governor of São Paulo. The paulista elite loathed Alberto, resenting his centralization efforts and alarmed by economic reforms such as five-percent wage increase and the minor distribution of land to participants in the revolution. Amid threats of revolt, Vargas replaced João Alberto with a civilian from São Paulo, appointed a conservative paulista banker as minister of finance, and announced a date for a constituent assembly. This did not satisfy the Paulista elite and may have even strengthened it; Vargas was now seen as a devious liar who was only satisfying them in order to hold on to power. They launched a revolt in July 1932 which collapsed after three months of armed combat.

Despite the attempted revolution, Vargas was determined to maintain his alliance with the farmer wing of his coalition and to strengthen ties with the São Paulo establishment. Further concessions alienated the coalition's left wing, especially the failure to honor land-reform promises made during the 1930 campaign. Vargas pardoned half the bank debts of the coffee planters, who maintained a grip on the state's electoral machinery. To pacify his paulista adversaries after their failed revolt, he ordered the Bank of Brazil to honor war bonds issued by the rebel government.

Vargas was increasingly threatened by pro-communist elements critical of the rural latifundios by 1934, who sought an alliance with the country's peasant majority by backing land reform. Despite his populist rhetoric, Vargas was ushered into power by planter oligarchies in remote regions amid a revolution and was in no position to meet communist demands.

=== Constitutional government ===
Following the failed constitutional revolution, Vargas continued with his efforts to schedule a Constitutional Assembly election in 1933 and an (indirect) presidential election in 1934, not for the sake of liberalization, but to legitimise the government. In the 1933 elections, many pro government parties with governors that Vargas had installed won in their respective states. The only major exception being Waldomiro Lima in São Paulo, who was one of only 5 governors whose parties lost the election. A new constitution was promulgated by the newly elected constitutional assembly shortly after. The constitution most notably made voting more accessible to the masses, introduced basic workers rights (and the freedom for worker unions to strike), installed civil liberties, states' rights and nationalized state industries. The Constitution was a compromise between two factions, the centralisation faction, and the federalisation faction. The result was a constitution had some reactionary elements and other elements which were in favour of the advancement of Brazilian culture. Vargas had concerns regarding the constitution, as he believed that it was too liberal and restricted his ability to govern.

In 1934, an indirect presidential election was held, meaning only members of Congress could vote. The government candidate was Getulio Vargas, and the opposition candidate was Borges de Medeiros, former governor of Rio de Janeiro. Vargas won the election with 159 votes to Medeiros' 75.

Now armed with a new constitution, primarily influenced by European fascist models, Vargas began reining in moderate trade unions and turning against the tenentes. More concessions to the latifundios pushed him toward an alliance with the integralists, Brazil's fascist movement. Vargas' regime between 1934 and 1945 was characterized by the co-opting of Brazilian unions through state-run, sham syndicates and suppression of opposition, particularly from the left.

=== Suppression of communism ===
The atmosphere in São Paulo was conducive to ideological extremism, and the rapidly-industrializing southeast favored European-style mass-movements. The Brazilian Communist Party was established in 1922, and the postwar period saw the country's first waves of general strikes by trade unions.

The Great Depression that brought Vargas to power sparked calls for social reform, countered by the mass mobilization of a potential new enemy: the urban proletariat. Vargas tried to impose a paternalistic tutelage over the working class to control and co-opt it. His supporters began to view labor, which was larger and better organized than it had been after the First World War, as a threat.

Vargas could unite the landed elites to stem the communists. With the cangaço repressed in the northeast, the new bourgeoisie and the landed oligarchs shifted their fears to the trade unions and socialist sentiments of the urban proletariat. Often composed of immigrants, the proletariat came from the more-urban southeast and was more European in population, culture, ideology, and industrial development. Vargas' alliance with labor disintegrated by 1934, and the country began a period of agitation. By mid-1935, Brazilian politics were destabilized.

Vargas focused on the two national ideological movements which were committed to European-style mass mobilization: one pro-communist, and the other pro-fascist. More intimidating was the National Liberation Alliance (ANL) launched in 1935, a left-wing popular front of socialists, communists, and other progressives led by the Communist Party and Luís Carlos Prestes. A revolutionary forerunner of Che Guevara, Prestes led the futile Prestes Column through the rural Brazilian interior after the failed 1922 tenente rebellion against the coffee oligarchs. This experience left Prestes and some of his comrades skeptical of armed conflict, and their skepticism helped precipitate the 1960s schism between hard-line Maoists and orthodox Marxist–Leninism which persists in the Brazilian Communist Party. With center-left tenentes out of the coalition and the left crushed, Vargas turned to his base of support on the right in a crackdown on the ANL. As his coalition moved to the right after 1934, Vargas' ideology remained ambiguous. Integralism, with a rapidly-growing membership by 1935, began filling this ideological void (especially among the approximately one million Brazilians of German descent).

Plínio Salgado, a writer and politician, founded Brazilian Integralist Action in October 1932. His party had fascist and Nazi symbolism, and used the Roman salute. It had all the visible elements of European fascism: a green-shirted paramilitary organization, street demonstrations, and aggressive rhetoric partially financed by the Italian embassy. The integralists borrowed their propaganda campaigns from Nazi materials, including excoriation of Marxism and liberalism, and support of nationalism, antisemitism and Christian virtues. They were supported by military officers, especially in the navy.

=== Foreign Relations ===
In the years of 1933 and 1934, Vargas, and the Brazilian government focused on developing foreign relations. Vargas was not familiar with diplomacy and spent much of his time learning and attempting fo foster friendship with other Latin American countries. In 1933, president Augustín Pedro Justo officially visited Brazil, eventually culminating in a declaration of friendship. In 1934, after Vargas' had been re-elected, he returned the visit, stopping by in Uruguay on his return and visiting president Gabriel Terra as well.

=== Economic development ===
Parallels between Vargas' politicized economy and European police states began to appear by 1934, when a new constitution was enacted with fascist influence. After 1934, fascist-style programs had two aims: stimulating industrial growth (under the guise of nationalism and autarky) and suppressing the working class. The Vargas government said that the corporatistic provisions of the constitution (passed on July 16, 1934) would unite all classes in mutual interest – the stated purpose of a similar governing document in Fascist Italy. This meant decimating independent organized labor and attracting the working class to the corporatistic state. Expanding industry and urbanization strengthened urban laborers, presenting the need to draw them into an alliance committed to the modernization of Brazil. Vargas and, later, Juan Perón in neighboring Argentina emulated Mussolini's strategy of consolidating power by mediating class disputes under the banner of nationalism.

The constitution established a new Chamber of Deputies that placed government authority over the private economy and established a system of corporatism aimed at industrialization and reduced foreign dependence. These provisions designated corporate representatives according to class and profession, organizing industries into state syndicates but generally maintaining private ownership of Brazilian-owned businesses.

The 1934–37 constitution and, especially, the Estado Novo heightened efforts to centralize authority in Rio de Janeiro and limit provincial autonomy. This progressive role sought to consolidate the 1930 revolution, replacing the power of the paulista coffee oligarchs with a centralised policy that respected local agro-exporting interests and created an economic base for the new urban sectors. State government would be rationalized and regularized, freed from the grip of coronelism.

The constitution established a more direct mechanism for the federal executive to control the economy, pursuing a policy of planning and direct investment in the creation of industrial complexes. State and mixed public-private companies dominated heavy and infrastructure industries, and private Brazilian capital predominated in manufacturing. Direct foreign investment increased during the 1930s as foreign corporations sought to enlarge their share of the internal market and overcome tariff barriers and exchange problems by establishing branch plants in Brazil. The state emphasized the economy's basic sectors, facing the difficult task of forging a viable capital base for future growth in mining, oil, steel, electric power, and chemicals.

== Third Brazilian Republic (Estado Novo) ==
Vargas' four-year term as president under the 1934 Constitution was due to expire in 1938, and he was barred from re-election. He made a national radio address on 10 November 1937 denouncing the Cohen Plan, which allegedly documented a communist plot to overthrow the government. The Cohen Plan was forged by the government to create a favourable atmosphere for Vargas to stay in power, perpetuating his rule and giving him dictatorial powers.

The communists had attempted to take over the government in a botched November 1935 coup attempt. After the failed uprising, the National Congress had given greater powers to Vargas and approved the creation of a National Security Tribunal in a statute adopted on 11 September 1936.

In his 10 November 1937 radio address, Vargas invoked the alleged communist threat, decreed a state of emergency, dissolved the legislature and announced the adoption by presidential fiat of a new, authoritarian constitution that placed all governing power in his hands. The 1934 constitution was abolished, and Vargas proclaimed an estado novo.

The powers of the National Security Tribunal were streamlined in the Third Brazilian Republic, and it focused on prosecuting political dissenters. Police powers were enhanced with the establishment of the Department of Political and Social Order (Departamento de Ordem Política e Social, or (DOPS), a political police and secret service. When it was created in 1936, the National Security Tribunal was supposed to be a temporary court; defendants could appeal its judgements to the Superior Military Court, Brazil's highest court for the armed forces, which was subordinate to the nation's supreme court. Communists and others accused of plotting coups were judged by the military court-martial system (with the National Security Tribunal the trial court for those cases), rather than by ordinary courts. The National Security Tribunal became a permanent court in the Estado Novo, autonomous from the rest of the court system. It gained authority to adjudicate cases involving communist conspirators and other coup plotters, and tried anyone accused of subverting or endangering the Estado Novo regime. Extrajudicial punishments were imposed by the police, especially the DOPS.

The 1937 constitution provided for elections to a new congress and a referendum confirming Vargas' actions. Neither was held, ostensibly due to the dangerous international situation. Under a transitional article of the constitution pending new elections, the president assumed legislative and executive powers; Vargas ruled for eight years under what amounted to martial law. According to the 1937 constitution, Vargas should have remained President for only six more years (until November 1943); he remained in power until he was overthrown in 1945. The Estado Novo dictatorship curtailed the autonomy of the judicial branch and the Brazilian states governed by federal interventors, who had legislative and executive powers (supposedly temporarily).

In December 1937, one month after the Estado Novo coup, Vargas signed a decree disbanding all political parties, including the fascist Brazilian Integralist Action (Ação Integralista Brasileira, or AIB). The integralists had, until then, been supportive of Vargas' anti-communist measures. Angered by the AIB suppression, they invaded the Guanabara Palace in an unsuccessful 11 May 1938 attempt to depose Vargas.

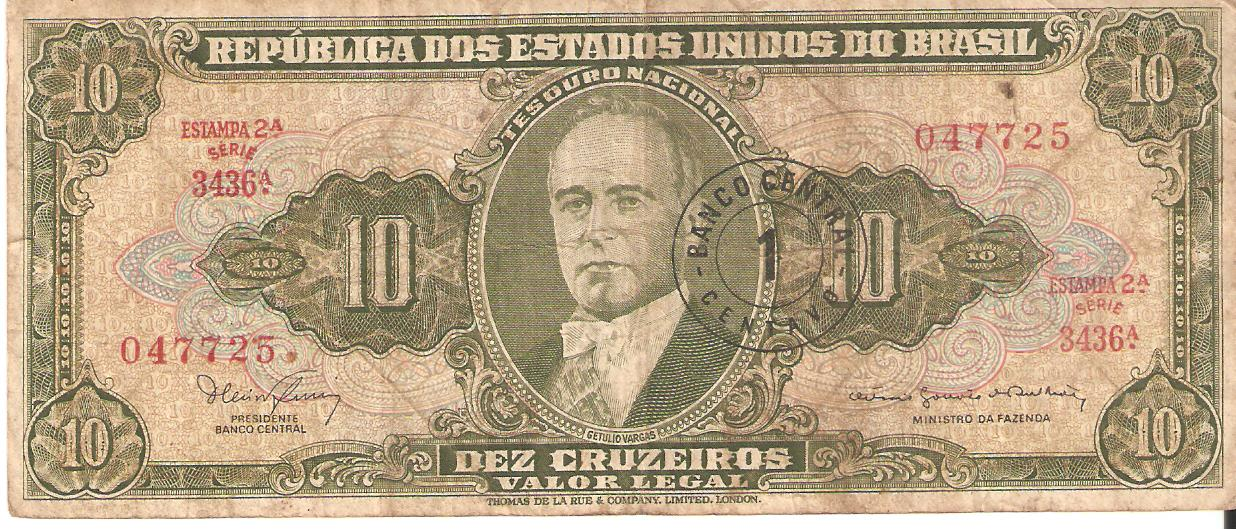
Ten-cruzeiro banknote with a portrait of Vargas

Between 1937 and 1945, during the Estado Novo, Vargas intervened in the economy and promoted economic nationalism. Known by his supporters as the "Father of the Poor", he provided them with tools to help improve their agrarian way of life.

During this period, a number of industrial bodies were created:

- The National Petroleum Council (Conselho Nacional do Petróleo, or CNP)
- The Administration Department of Public Service (Departamento Administrativo do Serviço Público, or DASP)
- The National Steel Company (CSN)
- The Rio Doce Valley Company
- The São Francisco Hydroelectric Company (Companhia Hidro-Elétrica do São Francisco)
- The Fábrica Nacional de Motores (FNM)

The Estado Novo affected modernist architecture in Brazil, implementing large-scale, incomplete urban planning. Curitiba, one of the world's best-planned cities, was planned by Alfred Agache during the Estado Novo.

Measures to restrain opposition included the nomination of intervenors for the states and media censorship by the Department of Press and Propaganda (Departamento de Imprensa e Propaganda, or DIP), which attempted to shape public opinion.

Vargas issued the Consolidation of Labor Laws (CLT) in 1943, guaranteeing job stability after ten years of service. The decree provided weekly rest, regulated the work of minors and women, regulated night-time work and set an eight-hour work day.

== Tensions with Argentina ==
The liberal revolution of 1930 overthrew the oligarchic coffee-plantation owners and brought to power an urban middle class and business interests that promoted industrialization and modernization. Promotion of new industry turned around the economy by 1933. Brazil's leaders in the 1920s and 1930s decided that Argentina's implicit foreign-policy goal was to isolate Portuguese-speaking Brazil from its Spanish-speaking neighbors, facilitating the expansion of Argentine economic and political influence in South America; they also feared that a more-powerful Argentine Army would launch a surprise attack on the weaker Brazilian Army. To counter this threat, Vargas forged closer links with the United States; Argentina moved in the opposite direction. During World War II, Brazil was an ally of the United States and sent an expeditionary force to Europe. The United States provided over $370 million in Lend-Lease grants in return for rent-free air bases (used to transport American soldiers and supplies across the Atlantic) and naval bases for anti-submarine operations. Argentina was officially neutral, at times favoring Germany.

== World War II ==
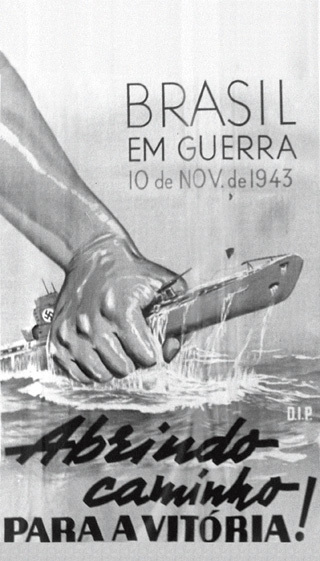
Brazilian propaganda poster announcing its declaration of war on the Axis powers, 10 November 1943. The caption reads, "Brazil at war ... Opening the road to victory!"

At first, Brazil had a neutral stance on the war. 40% of Germany's cotton was imported from Brazil, and Brazil itself had large migrant communities from the countries of the Axis Powers. (Germany, Italy and Japan) Vargas' main goal at the time was to facilitate Brazil's economic growth, and in order to do this, he needed to stay neutral between the soon-to-be Axis and Allies. However, after Pearl Harbor, Brazil's entry into the war became a matter of time, as it became clear that the Axis were a threat to the New World. The U.S. financed Brazilian iron-ore extraction and steel production and placed military bases along the country's north and northeastern coasts, headquartered in Natal. With the conquest of Southeast Asia by Japanese troops, allied companies also heavily invested into Brazilian rubber extraction after British Malaya fell, which was the allies' biggest producer and exporter of rubber, resulting in a second rubber boom and the forced migration of "soldados da borracha" (rubber soldiers) from the drought-stricken northeast to Amazônia.

After the sinking of over 25 Brazilian merchant ships by German and Italian submarines in 1942, popular mobilization forced the Brazilian government to abandon neutrality and declare war on Nazi Germany and Fascist Italy in August of that year. A government decision to send troops was not made until January 1943, when Vargas and U.S. President Franklin Delano Roosevelt met in Natal and the Brazilian Expeditionary Force (BEF) was created. In July 1944, the first BEF group was sent to fight in Italy.

Soon after the war, fearing the BEF's popularity and possible political use of the Allied victory by some of its members, the Brazilian government decided to demobilize. BEF veterans were forbidden from wearing military decorations or uniforms in public, and were transferred to outlying regions or border garrisons.

== End of the Vargas era ==
Brazilian participation in World War II increased pressure in favour of re-democratisation. Although the regime made some concessions (such as setting a date for presidential elections, amnesty for political prisoners, abolishing state censorship, freedom to organize political parties, and a commitment to a new electoral law), Vargas could not retain support and was deposed by the military in a coup launched from his War Ministry on 29 October 1945.

The two candidates for the scheduled election, Eurico Gaspar Dutra and Eduardo Gomes, agreed that the chief justice of the supreme court, José Linhares, should be the interim president. Hence, he was summoned to assume the presidency. The office of vice-president had also been abolished and no legislature had been elected under the 1937 constitution, making the chief justice first in the line of succession by default. Linhares immediately brought forward the date for presidential elections and a constituent assembly and replaced all state interventores, mostly with members of the judiciary. Elections were held in December 1945, and Linhares remained in office until the inauguration of the Assembly and President Eurico Gaspar Dutra on 31 January 1946. This marked the end of the Estado Novo and the beginning of the Fourth Brazilian Republic.

== See also ==
- Estado Novo (Portugal)
- Second presidency of Getúlio Vargas

== Bibliography ==
- João Fábio Bertonha (2023). Plínio Salgado: A Brazilian Fascist (1895–1975) Routledge Studies in Fascism and the Far Right. Taylor & Francis. ISBN 978-1000983395 – via Google Books.
- Castro, Celso; Izecksohn, Victor; Kraay, Hendrik (2004). Nova História Militar Brasileira. Fundação Getúlio Vargas. ISBN 978-85-225-0496-1. in Portuguese
- Ready, J. Lee (1985). Forgotten Allies: The European Theatre, Volume I. McFarland & Company. ISBN 978-0-89950-129-1.
- Brazil Now.Info Estado Novo.
- Garfield, Seth. "The Roots of a Plant That Today Is Brazil: Indians and the Nation-State under the Brazilian Estado Novo" Journal of Latin American Studies Vol. 29, No. 3 (Oct., 1997), pp. 747–768
- Bethell, Leslie (2008). The Cambridge history of Latin America. Cambridge: Cambridge University Press. ISBN 978-0-521-39524-3.
- Skidmore, Thomas E. (1986). Politics in Brazil: 1930 - 1964 ; an experiment in democracy (Reissued ed.). New York: Oxford Univ. Press. ISBN 978-0-19-500784-8.
