= National Petroleum Council =

National Petroleum Council may refer to:

- National Petroleum Council (US)
- National Petroleum Council (Brazil)
