= Brazilian Constitution of 1937 =

Brazilian statute from 1937 to 1946

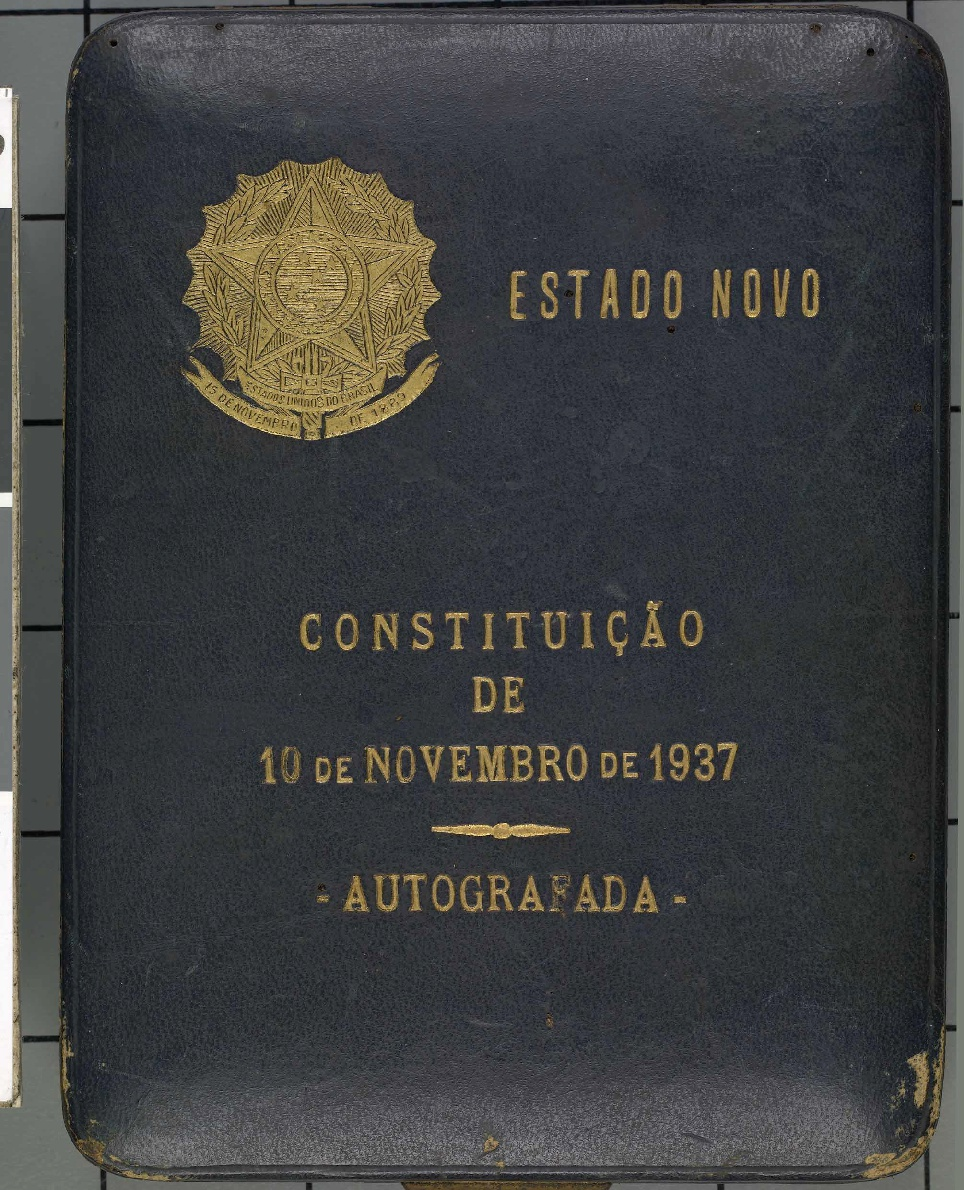
- Cover of the 1937 Constitution

Overview
- Original title: Constituição dos Estados Unidos do Brazil de 1937
- Jurisdiction: United States of Brazil
- Date effective: November 10, 1937
- System: Federative presidential republic under an authoritarian corporatist dictatorship

Government structure
- Branches: Three (executive, legislative, judiciary)
- Chambers: Bicameral: Federal Senate and the Chamber of Deputies
- Executive: President of Brazil
- Judiciary: Supreme Federal Court
- Author: Francisco Campos
- Supersedes: Brazilian Constitution of 1934
- Superseded by: Brazilian Constitution of 1946

Full text
- The New Constitution of the United States of Brazil at Wikisource
- Constituição dos Estados Unidos do Brazil de 1937 at Portuguese Wikisource

The Brazilian Constitution of 1937 (Portuguese: Constituição Brasileira de 1937), promulgated by President Getúlio Vargas on November 10, 1937, was Brazil's fourth constitution and the third of the republican period. It was instituted on the same day as the installation of the Estado Novo, Vargas' dictatorial regime, and aimed to legitimize his powers. The text was inspired by the authoritarian structure of the April Constitution of Poland, which was extremely centralizing and granted unlimited powers to the President. It was drafted by the jurist Francisco Campos, Minister of Justice, and obtained the prior approval of Vargas and General Eurico Gaspar Dutra, Minister of War.

The 1937 Constitution satisfied the interests of political groups who wanted a strong government that would benefit the dominant parties and consolidate the rule of those on Vargas' side. Its structure was strongly centralized, with the President of the Republic responsible for appointing the state authorities (intervenors), who would be responsible for appointing the municipal leaders. With the 1937 Constitution, Vargas established a fascist-inspired authoritarian regime that lasted until the end of the World War II and consolidated his government, which had begun in 1930.

After the fall of Vargas and the end of the Estado Novo in October 1945, elections for the National Constituent Assembly were held in parallel with the presidential election. Once the Constituent Assembly was elected, its members gathered to draft a new constitution, which came into force in September 1946.

== Historical context ==
The presidential election to be held in 1938, when Vargas would hand over power, had two applicants: the opposition candidate, Armando Salles de Oliveira, and the government candidate, José Américo de Almeida. However, Vargas refused to leave the presidency and declared a coup d'état that became known as Estado Novo, a name inspired by António Salazar's dictatorship in Portugal.

In 1934, Congress granted amnesty to former political persecutors, including Luís Carlos Prestes, leader of the Prestes Column and a member of the Communist Party of Brazil (PCB). Under the guidance of the Communist International, foreign communist agents and the national leadership of the PCB, the ANL (National Liberation Alliance) was founded, with Prestes as its honorary president and the goal of organizing an armed revolt against the Vargas regime and forming a popular government. In November 1935, the ANL organized a revolt, with uprisings in Rio de Janeiro and Natal, when military officers were coldly murdered while they slept in their barracks. The revolts were quickly suppressed; Natal was under the control of a communist government for three days. Vargas used the uprising as justification for the creation of the National Security Law of 1935, which was responsible for suspending the previous constitution and allowed him to suppress the ANL.

The alarmist campaign about the communist threat reached its peak on September 30, 1937, when the Cohen Plan, a communist strategy guided by the USSR to seize power and inaugurate a kind of "Brazilian Soviet republic", was released. Actually, the plan was a farce written by the military integralist Olímpio Mourão Filho, who would later trigger the military coup of March 31, 1964. Its name is an incorrect version of the name Kun, for Béla Kun, who led a short-lived communist regime in Hungary in 1919 (Mourão was informed that "Kun" was the Hungarian version of the Jewish surname "Cohen"). The plan was announced on the radio and in government newspapers, leading Eurico Gaspar Dutra, the Minister of War, and General Góis Monteiro, the head of the Armed Forces, to send a decree to Congress declaring a "state of war" on national territory, which was approved by almost three-quarters of the members of parliament.

Fifty days later, with the support of the integralists, the conservative military, the industrial bourgeoisie and intervenors from various states, Vargas ordered the police to surround the Chamber of Deputies, imposed a recess on the legislature and granted the new constitution.

== Elaboration and enactment ==
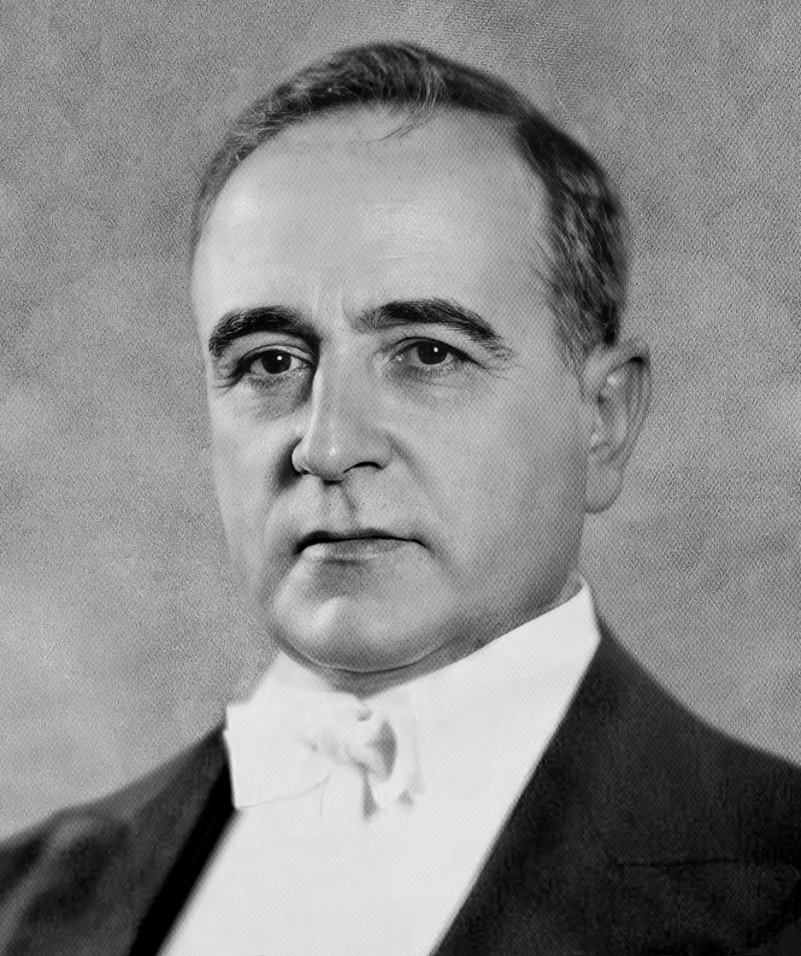
Portrait of Getúlio Vargas.

The 1937 Constitution was drafted and written mostly by Francisco Campos (who would later prepare the institutional acts of the 1964 military dictatorship), with the assistance of integralist leaders, a year before the coup. Soon after the constitution was granted, Campos was appointed Minister of Justice. Its ideas were inspired by the authoritairan sanationist legislation of Polish leader Józef Piłsudski and the laws of the Mussolini regime in Italy. The text followed the positivist and authoritarian tendencies of Júlio de Castilhos and Flores da Cunha.

== Main aspects ==
The Brazilian constitution of 1937 met the interests of political groups who wanted a strong government that would consolidate the rule of those who sided with Vargas. According to Paulo Bonavides in his work Curso de Direito Constitucional, the document:

[...] represents in the context of constitutionalism a broad outline of the limitation of the authority of the ruler. The king, prince or head of state wields absolute powers in his hands, but unilaterally consents to divest himself of a portion of his unlimited prerogatives, for the benefit of the people, who enjoy rights and guarantees, both legal and political, apparently by the sole work and grace of royal munificence.

From a legal point of view, the 1937 Constitution is a unilateral act of sovereign political will. Politically, it represents a concession made by that sovereign will to the rising popular power. Its main provisions are: the centralization of executive and legislative powers by the President of the Republic; the establishment of indirect elections for President with a six-year term; the admission of the death penalty; a veto on liberalism; the removal of workers' right to strike; permission for the government to purge officials who opposed the regime; and the holding of a referendum, which never took place.

The text maintained some of the characteristics of previous statutes, such as the tripartite division of powers, the "presence" of the Federal District in direct administration and the laicity of the country. The previous constitutions had no mention of plebiscites, but the 1946 Constitution used it with effectiveness; the 1967 Constitution mentioned prior consultation with the population. The plebiscite was more effectively guaranteed in the 1988 Citizens' Constitution.

=== Amendments and modifications ===
The amendment of December 2, 1937 extinguished all political parties; most were established only at election time and dissolved as soon as they were held. The only two parties of national prominence were the PCB (Communist Party of Brazil) and the AIB (Brazilian Integralist Action); the first had been underground since its foundation. Strikes ended, the nationalization campaign was launched, unions were controlled and there were no elections to the legislature or the executive.

== See also ==
- History of Brazil
- Constitution of Brazil
- Estado Novo (Brazil)
