= National Liberation Alliance (Brazil) =

Brazilian left-wing movement (1934–1937)

National Liberation Alliance Aliança Nacional Libertadora
- President: Herculino Cascardo
- Founded: 1934
- Dissolved: 1937
- Ideology: Socialism; Communism; Marxism; Anti-fascism; Anti-imperialism; Anti-integralism
- Political position: Left-wing
- Slogan: Pão, Terra, Liberdade (Bread, Land, Freedom)

The National Liberation Alliance (Portuguese: Aliança Nacional Libertadora – ANL) was a left-wing movement formed by sectors of different anti-imperialist, anti-fascist and anti-integralist organizations. The collective had the support of the Brazilian Communist Party.

== History ==
=== Founding ===
At the beginning of the 1930s, popular fronts appeared in several countries composed of different political currents seeking unified action to stop the advance of Nazi-fascism. In Brazil, as a reaction to the expansion of the Brazilian Integralist Action (AIB), small anti-fascist groups, which included communists, anarchist socialists and former tenentists were dissatisfied with the rapprochement between the Vargas government and the oligarchic groups removed from power in 1930, emerged.

In 1934, a small number of left-wing intellectuals and military officers, including Francisco Mangabeira, Manuel Venâncio Campos da Paz, Moésia Rolim, Carlos da Costa Leite, Gregório Lourenço Bezerra, Caio Prado Júnior, João Saldanha and Aparício Torelly, organized meetings in Rio de Janeiro in order to create a political organization able to give national support to popular struggles. The outcome was the ANL, whose first public manifesto was read out in the Chamber of Deputies in January 1935. The organization's basic program, released in February, included the suspension of the payment of Brazil's foreign debt, the nationalization of foreign companies, agrarian reform and the protection of small and medium-sized landowners and the guarantee of broad democratic freedoms. The constitution of a popular government was also proposed, but without defining the means by which it would be achieved.

In March 1935, the ANL's provisional national directory was formed and included Herculino Cascardo (president), Amoreti Osório (vice-president), Francisco Mangabeira, Roberto Sisson, Benjamim Soares Cabello and Manuel Venâncio Campos da Paz. In the same month, the ANL was officially launched at a ceremony in Rio de Janeiro attended by thousands of people. The manifesto was read by Carlos Lacerda, a student who would later become one of the biggest opponents of communism. At the time, Luís Carlos Prestes, who was in the Soviet Union and commanded prestige due to his role as leader of the Prestes Column, was acclaimed honorary president of the organization.

=== Regional sections ===
Throughout 1934 and 1935, many citizens formally joined the ANL, although the exact number of members was never known. Important figures joined, such as Miguel Costa, Maurício de Lacerda and Abguar Bastos. Several personalities, although not affiliated, showed their support for the ANL, such as former intervenors Filipe Moreira Lima, from Ceará, Magalhães Barata, from Pará, Federal Deputy Domingos Velasco and the Mayor of the Federal District, Pedro Ernesto. The ANL held rallies and public demonstrations in several cities and had its activities publicized by two daily newspapers directly linked to the organization, one in Rio de Janeiro and the other in São Paulo.

In Rio Grande do Sul, the ANL was founded at a ceremony held at the São Pedro Theater, with Aparício Cora de Almeida as its first secretary and writer Dyonélio Machado as its president. Eloy Martins, a communist leader, reported that Aparício was a "non-legalized" member of the Brazilian Communist Party and that his death may have been a political assassination due to his links with the ANL.

In Santa Catarina, the ANL, formed in 1935 and led by metalworkers and electricians such as Álvaro Ventura, João Verzola and Manoel Alves Ribeiro, was responsible for founding the PCB after the repression caused by Getúlio Vargas' Estado Novo.

== Communist uprising of 1935 ==
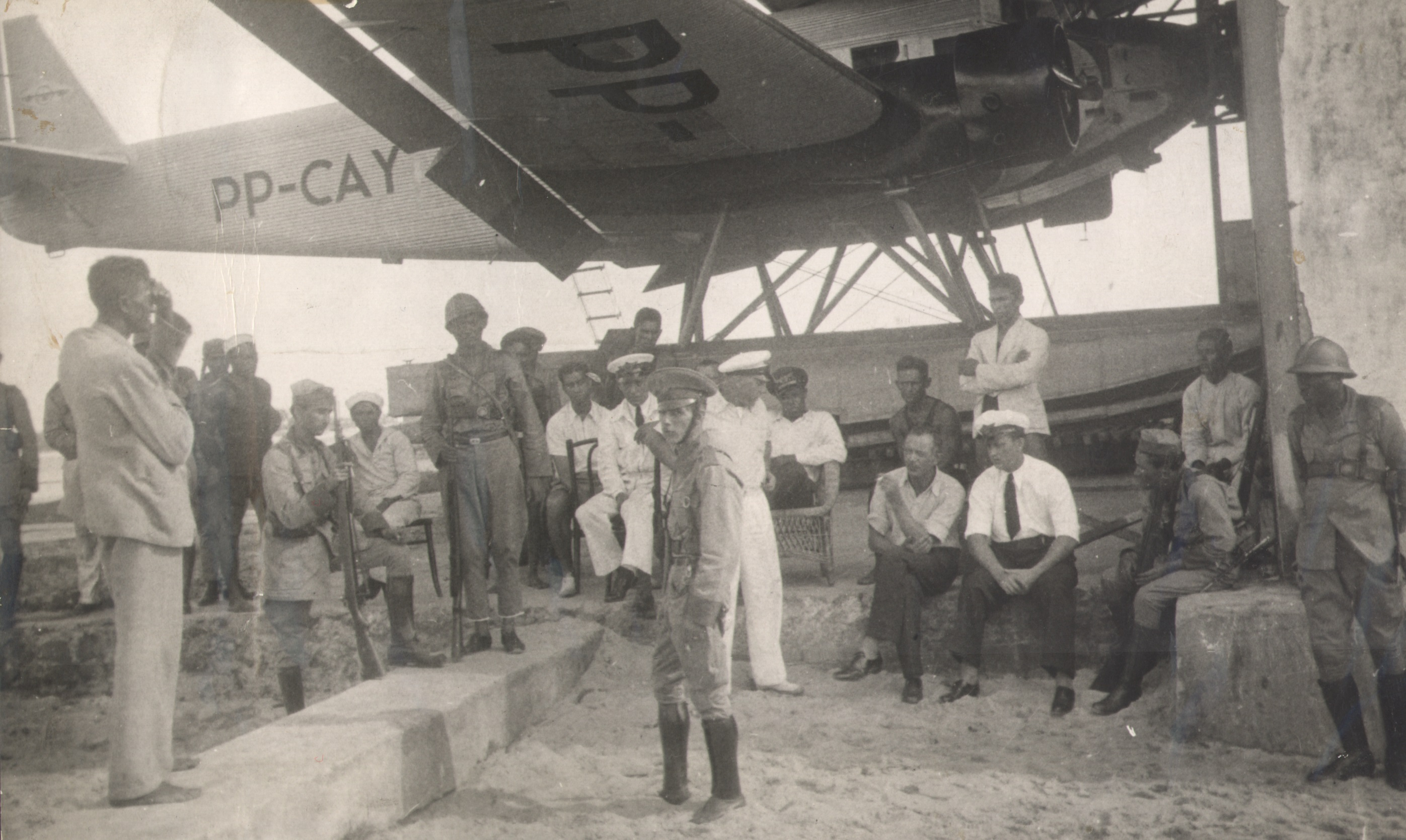
Communist civilians and rebel soldiers stand guard near the captured aircraft

In April 1935, Luís Carlos Prestes returned to Brazil clandestinely, tasked by the leadership of the Communist International with promoting an armed uprising that would establish a national-revolutionary government in the country. He received the collaboration of a small but experienced group of foreign militants, including his wife, the German Olga Benário.

The growth of the ANL caused increased political tension in Brazil, resulting in street conflicts between communists and integralists. On July 5, the ANL held public demonstrations to celebrate the anniversary of the revolts of 1922 and 1924. During the event, a manifesto written by Prestes proposing the overthrow of the government and demanding "all power to the ANL" was read out, despite the wishes of many ANL leaders. Vargas, based on the National Security Law enacted in April, ordered the organization closed.

Now illegal, the ANL was unable to hold large public demonstrations and lost contact with the popular masses. Members of the PCB and the "lieutenants", who were ready to launch an armed uprising to depose Vargas, gained strength. In November 1935, a communist uprising broke out in Natal, Rio Grande do Norte, on behalf of the ANL. The protest, which achieved popular support and controlled Natal for four days, also caused uprisings in Recife and Rio de Janeiro. Consequently, the federal government began repressing all kinds of opposition groups in Brazil, whether or not they were linked to the uprising. The ANL was entirely dismantled.

After November 1935, the National Congress approved a series of measures that restricted its own power, while the Executive gained unlimited forces of repression. On November 10, 1937, Vargas unleashed a coup d'état, closed Congress and installed a dictatorial regime that remained active until 1945.

== See also ==
- Prestes Column
- Estado Novo
- 1937 Brazilian coup d'état
