= 1933 Brazilian Constitutional Assembly election =

Constitutional Assembly elections were held in Brazil on 3 May 1933 to elect the 214 directly elected deputies of an Assembly that would draw up a new constitution. A further 40 members were indirectly elected: 18 by trade unions, 17 by employer organisations, three by members of liberal professions and two by civil servants. The elections have been described as the first democratic and honest elections in the country's history.

They were also the first national elections with women's suffrage, although it was still limited to married women, unmarried women with their own income and widows. Carlota Pereira de Queirós became the first woman elected to national office.

== Electoral system ==
The elections were held using open list proportional representation. Voters could cast preferential votes for candidates from multiple parties.

Despite the voting age being reduced from 21 to 18 and women's suffrage being introduced, the number of registered voters fell from 1,893,000 in 1930 to 1,466,700.

== Results ==
A total of 1,037 candidates contested the elections.

Party	Votes	%	Seats
Progressive Party	157,769		31
Baía Social Democratic Party	47,826		20
Single List for a United São Paulo (PRP-PD)	164,755		17
Social Democratic Party of Pernambuco	24,384		15
Liberal Republican Party	136,533		13
Radical People's Party			10
Pará Liberal Party	14,968		7
Catholic Electoral League			6
Autonomist Party	10,876		6
National Party			6
Mineiro Republican Party	43,711		6
Paraíba Progressive Party			5
Maranhão Republican Party			4
Social Democratic Party	5,529		4
Republican Social Party	9,216		4
Fluminense Progressive Union			4
United Front (PRR-PL)	37,592		3
Freedom and Civics			3
Agriculture Party			3
Catarinense Liberal Party			3
Mato Grossense Liberal Party			3
Socialist National Party			3
Rio Grande do Norte People's Party			3
Social Democratic Party			3
Espírito Santo Social Democratic Party			3
Brazilian Socialist Party			3
Amazonense Civic Union			3
Maranhense Republican Union			3
Baía is still Baía			2
People's Slate			2
Economist Party of Brazil			2
Fluminense Socialist Party			2
Liberal Workers' Party			1
Legenda Constitucionalista			1
Legenda Hugo Napoleão			1
Legenda por Santa Catarina (PRC-Republican Legion)	10,523		1
Constitutionalist Party			1
Democratic Party			1
Paranaense Liberal Party			1
Republican Social Party	4,838		1
Nationalist Social Party			1
Sergipe Republican Union			1
Independents			2
Indirectly elected members			40
Total			254
Valid votes	1,157,761	94.69	
Invalid/blank votes	64,863	5.31	
Total votes	1,222,624	100.00	
Registered voters/turnout	1,466,700	83.36	
Source: TSE, TSE

== Aftermath ==
The Assembly began work in November 1933 and the new constitution drafted by the Assembly was promulgated in July 1934. It provided for a federal state with a bicameral parliament, but abolished the position of vice president. The Assembly was then converted into a Chamber of Deputies and elected Getúlio Vargas as president.
