= Dyonélio Machado =

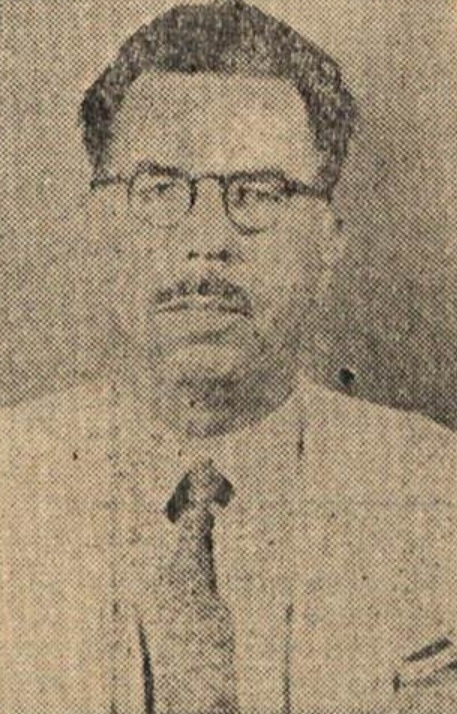
- Born: 21 August 1895
- Died: 19 June 1985 (aged 89)

Dyonélio Tubino Machado (21 August 1895 - 19 June 1985) was a Brazilian writer, psychiatrist and political activist, one of the representatives of the second generation of Modernism in Brazil.

== Life and career ==
Machado was born in Quaraí, Rio Grande do Sul, to Sylvio Rodrigues Machado and Elvira Tubino Machado. His father was murdered when he was still a child. When he was only eight years old, he sold lottery tickets to help support his family - his mother and his brother Severino.

The family poverty did not prevent him, however, from continuing his studies. Dyonélio gave lessons to boys from the lower classes and, in exchange, he and his brother could study without paying school fees. At the age of twelve, he worked as a servant at the weekly newspaper O Quaraí, where he began to mix with the local intellectuals. In the same city he founded, around 1911, the newspaper O Martelo.

From 1924 to 1929, he studied Medicine in Porto Alegre, and specialized in psychiatry in Rio de Janeiro; in 1932 he published the thesis Uma definição biológica do crime advised by Antônio Austregésilo. He was one of the main proponents of psychoanalysis in Rio Grande do Sul. In 1934, he translated Edoardo Weiss's Elements of Psychoanalysis to Portuguese.

With a growing interest in journalism and literature, he began to frequent the Porto Alegre circle known as "the Praça da Harmonia group," which included the doctor Celestino Prunes, Eduardo Guimarães, Alceu Wamosy, and Almir Alves. Machado began his fictional work with the short stories of Um Pobre Homem (1927). Among his works are Os Ratos (1935), O louco do Cati (1942), Deuses econômicos (1966), Endiabrados (1980), Fada (1982), Ele vem do fundão (1982) and O estadista. His work had a late recognition, having received prominence in academic circles only from the 1990s on. The psychological aspect is quite ingrained in his work, as evidenced by O louco do Cati and Os ratos.

== Political activism ==
A dedicated member of the Brazilian Communist Party (PCB), Machado was elected, president of the regional section of the Aliança Nacional Libertadora (ANL) at a founding assembly at the São Pedro Theatre in Porto Alegre. In 1935 he was accused of undermining the political and social order by working to organize a printers' strike. Released from prison on parole, he was arrested again the same year, during the 1935 uprisings. Machado's ideological positions cost him two years of his life spent in political prisons. However, he did not change his convictions and was elected state representative in the 1947 elections for the PCB (still legalized). He became the leader of this group, in the Legislative Assembly of Rio Grande do Sul, which included Antonio Ribas Pinheiro Machado Neto and Otto Ohlweiler.

== Works ==
=== Essays ===
- Política contemporânea: Três aspectos (Porto Alegre: Globo, 1923)
- A alimentação no Rio Grande do Sul; alguns aspectos (Porto Alegre: Assembléia Legislativa do Estado do Rio Grande do Sul, 1947)

=== Medicine and psychiatry ===
- Uma definição biológica do crime (Porto Alegre: Globo, 1933)
- Eletroencefalografia (Porto Alegre: Globo, 1944)

=== Fiction ===
- Um pobre homem (Porto Alegre: Globo, 1927) short stories
- Os ratos (São Paulo: Nacional, 1935)
- O louco do Cati (Porto Alegre: Globo, 1942)
- Desolação (Rio de Janeiro: José Olympio, 1944)
- Passos perdidos (São Paulo: Martins, 1946)
- Deuses econômicos (Rio de Janeiro: Leitura, 1966) (*)
- Prodígios (São Paulo: Moderna, 1980) (*)
- Endiabrados (São Paulo: Ática, 1980)
- Nuanças (São Paulo: Moderna, 1981)
- Sol subterrâneo (São Paulo: Moderna, 1981) (*)
- Fada (São Paulo: Moderna, 1982)
- Ele vem do fundão (São Paulo: Ática, 1982)
- O estadista (Rio de Janeiro: Graphia, 1995) novel included in the posthumous work O cheiro de coisa viva

(*) The books Deuses econômicos, Prodígios and Sol subterrâneo are part of the Liberation Trilogy (in Portuguese: «Trilogia da Libertação»).

=== Posthumous works ===
- Memórias de um pobre homem (Porto Alegre: IEL, 1990, research organization and notes by María Zenilda Grawunder)
- O cheiro de coisa viva: entrevistas, reflexões dispersas e um romance inédito: o estadista (Río de Janeiro: Graphia, 1995)
- O pensamento político de Dyonelio Machado (Porto Alegre: Assembléia Legislativa do Estado do Rio Grande do Sul, 2006) (Coord. Escola do Legislativo «Deputado Romildo Bolzan»)
