= Caio Prado Júnior =

Brazilian historian, geographer, writer, philosopher and politician

Caio da Silva Prado Júnior
- Born: February 11, 1907; São Paulo, Brazil
- Died: November 23, 1990 (aged 83); São Paulo, Brazil

Academic background
- Education: Faculdade do Largo de São Francisco, University of São Paulo

Caio da Silva Prado Júnior (February 11, 1907 – November 23, 1990) was a Brazilian historian, geographer, writer, philosopher and politician. His works inaugurated a new historiographic tradition in Brazil, identified with Marxism, which led to new interpretations of Brazilian colonial society.

== Biography ==
Caio Prado graduated with a degree in law from Faculdade do Largo de São Francisco, São Paulo in 1928, where he would later become a Professor of Political Economy. He was politically active during the 1930s and 1940s, including during the Revolution of 1930. In 1933, he published his first work - Evolução Política do Brasil (Political Evolution of Brazil) - an attempt to understand the country's political and social history. In 1934 he took part in the foundation of Brazilian Geographers Association.

After a trip to the Soviet Union, at the time under the harshest Stalinist authoritarianism, he published URSS - um novo mundo (Soviet Union - a New World), which was banned by Getúlio Vargas' government's censorship. He then joined the Aliança Nacional Libertadora which he chaired in São Paulo.

In 1942 he published the classic Formação do Brasil Contemporâneo - Colônia (Formation of Contemporary Brazil - Colony), which should have been the first part of a work on Brazilian historical evolution. However, the following volumes were never written. In 1945 he was elected deputado estadual for the Brazilian Communist Party. He published the newspaper A Platéia and, in 1943, with Arthur Neves and Monteiro Lobato, he founded Editora Brasiliense (Brasiliense Publishing House), for which, later, he published Revista Brasiliense, between 1956 and 1964. After 1964, he was persecuted by the military dictatorship.

In 1966 he was elected Intellectual of the Year by the União Brasileira de Escritores, following the publication of A revolução brasileira (Brazilian Revolution).

== Works ==
The most important works of Caio Prado Junior are:

- 1933: Evolução política do Brasil
- 1934: URSS - um novo mundo
- 1942: Formação do Brasil Contemporâneo (translated as The colonial background of modern Brazil Berkeley : University of California Press, 1967)
- 1945: História Econômica do Brasil
- 1952: Dialética do Conhecimento
- 1953: Evolução Política do Brasil e Outros Estudos
- 1954: Diretrizes para uma Política Econômica Brasileira
- 1957: Esboço de Fundamentos da Teoria Econômica
- 1959: Introdução à Lógica Dialética (Notas Introdutórias)
- 1962: O Mundo do Socialismo
- 1966: A Revolução Brasileira
- 1971: Estruturalismo de Lévi-Strauss - O Marxismo de Louis Althusser
- 1972: História e Desenvolvimento
- 1979: A Questão Agrária no Brasil
- 1980: O que é Liberdade
- 1981: O que é Filosofia
- 1983: A Cidade de São Paulo
