= Brazilian Constitution of 1934 =

Brazilian statute between 1934-1937

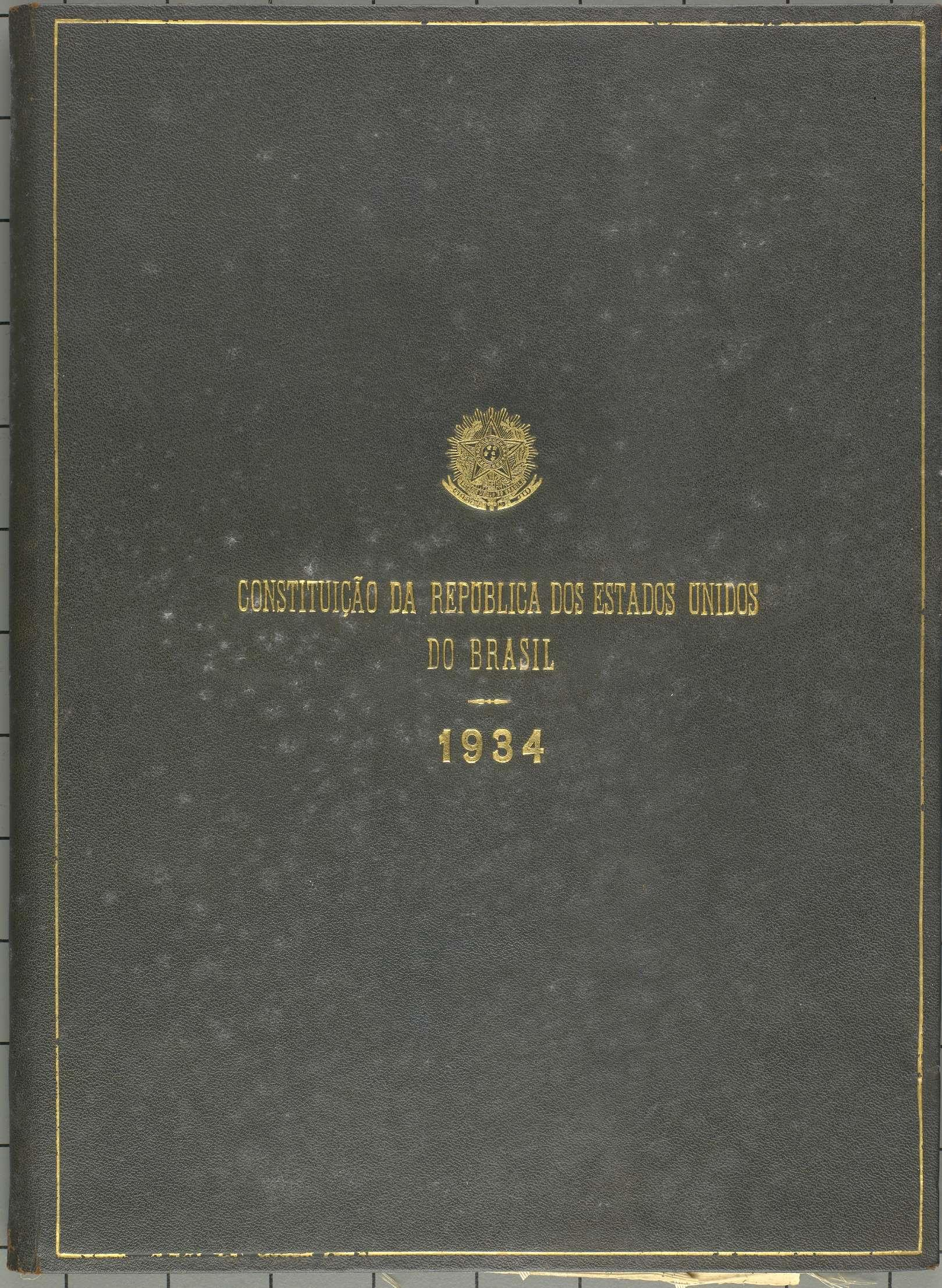
- Cover of a signed copy of the 1934 Constitution of the Republic of the United States of Brazil held by the National Archives

Overview
- Jurisdiction: United States of Brazil
- Date effective: July 16, 1934
- System: Federative presidential republic

Government structure
- Branches: Three (executive, legislative, judiciary)
- Chambers: Bicameral: Federal Senate and the Chamber of Deputies
- Executive: President of Brazil
- Judiciary: Supreme Federal Court
- Authors: National Congress of Brazil; Constituent Assembly of 1933
- Supersedes: Brazilian Constitution of 1891
- Superseded by: Brazilian Constitution of 1937

The Brazilian Constitution of 1934, promulgated on July 16 by the National Constituent Assembly of 1932, was created "to organize a democratic regime that ensures the unity, freedom, justice and social and economic well-being of the nation," as stated in its preamble. Among Brazilian constitutions, it lasted the shortest: it was officially in force for one year, when it was suspended by the National Security Law. It was significant for institutionalizing the reform of Brazil's political and social organization, establishing Brazilian democracy with the inclusion of the military, the urban middle class, workers and industrialists.

The 1934 Constitution was a possible consequence of the Constitutionalist Revolution of 1932, when troops from São Paulo, including volunteers, Army soldiers and the Public Force, fought against the Brazilian Army. It was also a result of tenentism and the Revolution of 1930, when dissident soldiers supported by part of the population overthrew the First Republic.

In 1934, the National Constituent Assembly, convened by the Provisional Government of the 1930 Revolution, drafted and promulgated Brazil's second republican constitution. The document reformulated the organization of the First Republic and made progressive changes, but it was short-lived: in 1937, a ready-made constitution was signed by Getúlio Vargas, converting the president into a dictator and the revolutionary state into an authoritarian one.

== Historical context ==
After the 1930 Revolution, Brazil was under a provisional government for four years. The First Republic and the 1891 constitution were abolished, while lieutenants and opponents of the coffee oligarchies tried to build a new government. The elected president of Brazil in 1930, Júlio Prestes, from São Paulo, was prevented from taking office, and Getúlio Vargas took over on November 3, 1930.

One of the first measures of the provisional government, headed since November 1930 by Getúlio Vargas, was to appoint trusted interventors for all the states, except for Minas Gerais, governed by his ally Olegário Maciel, who helped in his revolutionary project to end the oligarchies. In 1932, the state of São Paulo protested, demanding that Getúlio Vargas convene a National Constituent Assembly. They argued that the provisional government was, in fact, a dictatorship, and Vargas responded by claiming that the Constituent Assembly had already been convened in February 1932, before the revolution.

The Assembly was elected in May 1933 and inaugurated in November of the same year, with the task of providing Brazil with a constitution that would adapt to the new times and provide greater access to the lower classes of society; the illiterate, however, would continue to be excluded from power.

Between 1930 and 1934, Getúlio Vargas' government took emergency measures to combat the international crisis, such as organizing trade unions subordinated to the government in order to contain social tensions and buying and burning sacks of coffee to interrupt the fall in coffee prices due to the Great Depression. However, the administration needed a legal basis to sustain and confirm it in power; that foundation would be the 1934 Constitution.

== Preparation and enactment ==
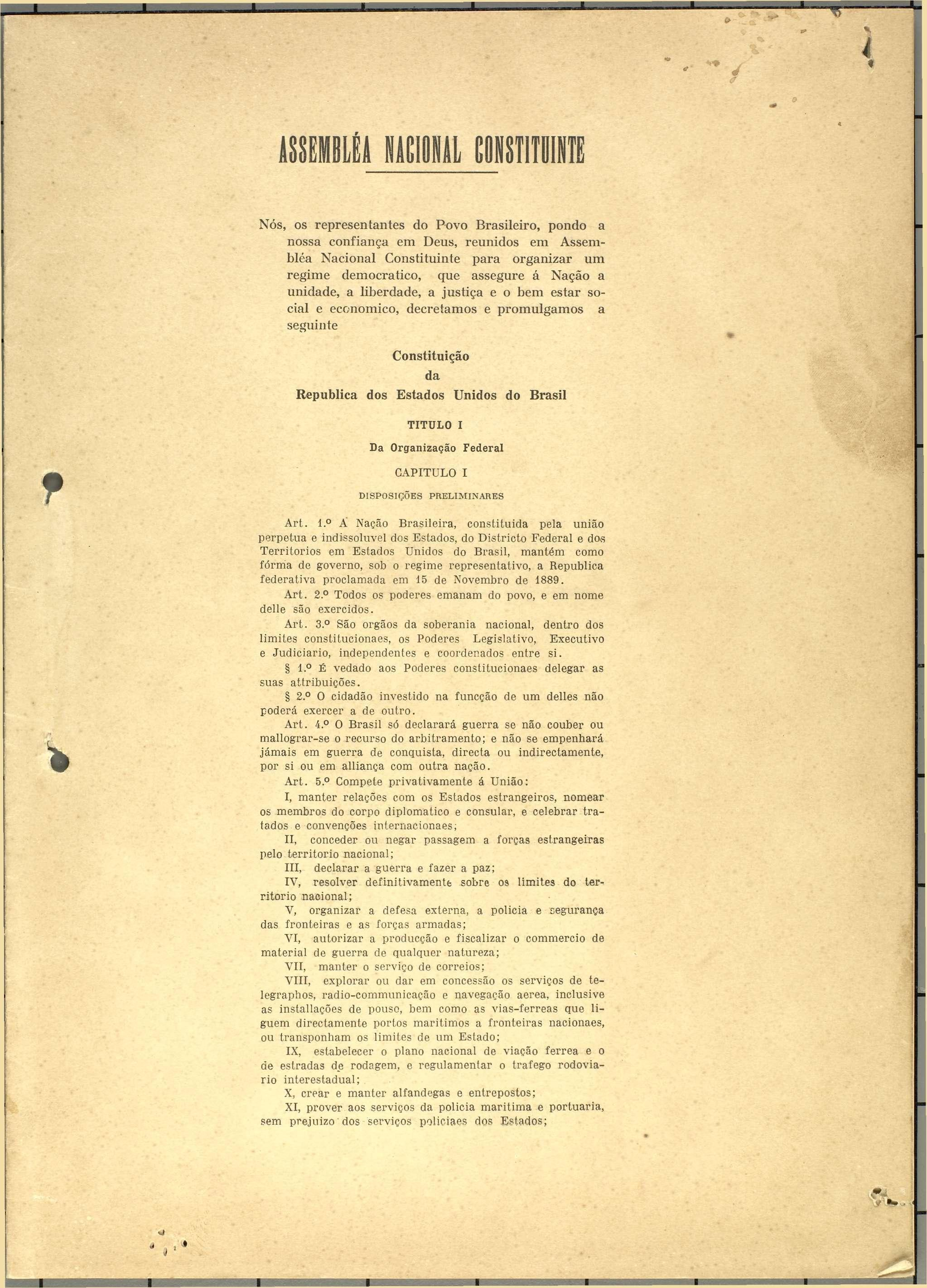
First page of the 1934 Constitution of the Republic of the United States of Brazil. National Archives.

In 1933, the provisional government created a board of jurists called the Itamaraty Commission, named after the Itamaraty Palace, to draw up a preliminary draft constitution, which provided for a strong and centralizing federal executive power. However, the final document ended up being decentralizing and statist, allowing the federal states a great sense of autonomy; the state senates were abolished and never existed again. The ruling class, previously composed of the coffee oligarchy, now included industrialists, the middle class and the military, except in Minas Gerais and Rio Grande do Sul where the PRM and PRR continued to dominate politics; the new constitution would need to express this. In Europe, fascist and authoritarian regimes were on the rise.

The influence of the German constitution of 1920 (Weimar Republic), which established a federalist republic with a strong executive, was very significant. Spain's 1931 constitution was also a source of inspiration for the creators of the Brazilian draft. The 1934 constitution instituted important reforms that contributed to the democratization of Brazil and greater inclusion of the less privileged, such as the women's secret ballot and labor laws, but it also allowed for persecution with the National Security Law.

The 1934 document was drafted and discussed in the National Constituent Assembly, which consisted of 214 parliamentarians, plus 40 union representatives, recommended by the government itself, as was done in Mussolini's Italy and Hitler's Germany. Both important reforms (such as changing the electoral system, with a secret ballot and women's suffrage) and simply details (such as the modernization of spelling rules and whether or not to mention "God" in the preamble) were the subject of debate. Finally, on July 15, 1934, Brazil received a new constitution and the Assembly confirmed Getúlio Vargas as president.

== Characteristics of the 1934 constitution and its critics ==
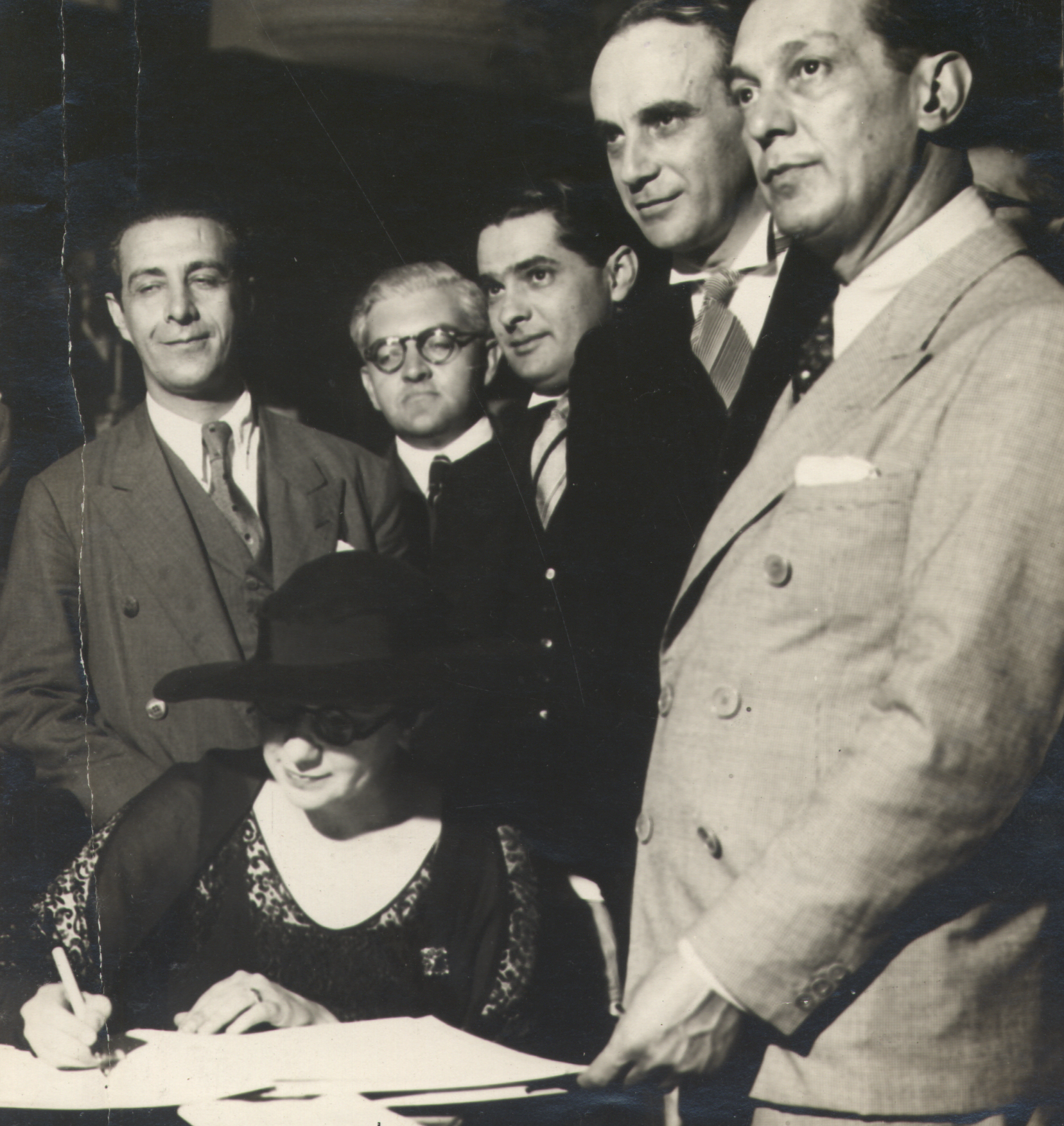
Carlota Pereira de Queirós, the only woman in the 1933 Constituent Assembly.

Almost all Brazilian constitutions were inspired by a foreign country. The 1824 constitution was based on the French constitution of 1814, which restored the Bourbon dynasty; the 1891 constitution was based on that of the United States (including adopting the official name of the country, which changed from the Empire to the United States of Brazil); the 1934 constitution was based on the German Weimar constitution; and the 1937 constitution was based on the Polish constitution. Even the New Deal policy in the United States served as a reference for some points. In the end, the 1934 Constitution was a great mixture of liberal, authoritarian, statist, idealistic, utopian and corporatist principles.

The document, in terms of labour legislation, is very progressive, with clear influences from the pre-Revolutionary Socialist ideas of the 1930s. It also established federalism in Brazil, with autonomous states in relation to the Union; in practice, this didn't happen, as the Vargas government promoted the centralization of power from the beginning. However, it represented an important advance desired since 1922, the beginning of the Tenentist revolts.

President Getúlio Vargas was the biggest critic of the 1934 Constitution, giving it an extremely negative opinion. The main criticism was based on its inflationary nature, since it was calculated that if all the nationalizations of banks and mines were carried out, and if all the social rights provided for in it were implemented, the costs for private companies, government spending and the public deficit would increase greatly.

According to the document, one of the government's major expenses was to "help large families", which constituted the vast majority of Brazilian families at that time. Getúlio's second criticism was that, because the document was too liberal, it didn't permit an adequate fight against subversion.

On November 11, 1940, at the commemorations of the 10th anniversary of the 1930 revolution, Getúlio briefly expressed his criticism of the 1934 Constitution:

A hasty constitutionalization, out of time, presented as a solution to all ills, resulted in a political organization tailored to personal influences and factional partisanship, divorced from existing realities. It repeated the mistakes of the 1891 Constitution and aggravated them with provisions of pure legal invention, some retrograde and others nodding to exotic ideologies. Events have attested to its early unsuitability!

== Main measures ==
Considered progressive for the time, the new Constitution:

- introduced the secret ballot;
- established compulsory voting for people over the age of 18;
- provided for women's suffrage, a long-demanded right, which had already been instituted in 1932 by the Electoral Code of the same year;
- provided for the creation of the Labor Court;
- provided for the creation of the Election Court;
- nationalized the country's subsoil wealth and waterfalls;
- foresees the nationalization of banks and insurance companies;
- stipulated that foreign companies must have at least 2/3 Brazilian employees;
- confirmed the Electoral Law of 1932, with Election Court, women's suffrage, voting at the age of 18 (previously at 21) and class deputies (representatives of trade union classes);
- banned child labor, established an eight-hour working day, compulsory weekly rest, paid vacations, compensation for workers dismissed without just cause, medical and dental care, and paid care for pregnant workers;
- banned wage differentials for the same job on the grounds of age, sex, nationality or marital status;
- provided for a special law to regulate agricultural work and relations in the countryside (which was never enacted) and reduced the period for applying for usucaption to one third of the original 30 years.

With the 1934 Constitution, the social movement became a major issue in the country: democratic rights were won, popular participation in the political process increased and the oligarchies felt threatened - along with the bourgeoisie - by the increasing organization of the Brazilian workers and their demands. At that time, the first major national campaign involving the press was registered: the debate about the nationalist appeal proclaimed by Integralism, an anti-liberal, anti-socialist, authoritarian movement, similar to Italian Fascism.

The document served the interests of the former tenentists and nationalists, by promoting the modernization of social institutions (providing, for example, for the nationalization of foreign companies when "necessary"); the interests of the oligarchy, which continued to be present and active, especially in São Paulo and Minas Gerais; and even the interests of the integralists, when it established trade union organizations subordinated directly to the government.

== See also ==
- Constitution of Brazil
- History of Brazil
