= João Mangabeira =

Brazilian jurist, politician and writer

Minister of Justice and Internal Affairs
- In office 24 January 1963 – 7 June 1963
- President: João Goulart
- Preceded by: Alfredo Nasser
- Succeeded by: Carlos Molinari

Minister of Mines and Energy
- In office 27 July 1962 – 18 September 1962
- Prime Minister: Brochado da Rocha
- Preceded by: Gabriel Passos
- Succeeded by: Eliezer Batista

Federal Deputy for Bahia
- In office 28 May 1947 – 12 March 1951
- In office 9 July 1937 – 10 November 1937
- In office 2 May 1935 – 21 March 1936
- In office 15 May 1915 – 31 December 1929
- In office 3 May 1909 – 31 December 1911

Senator for Bahia
- In office 3 May 1930 – 11 November 1930

State Deputy of Bahia
- In office 7 April 1906 – 7 April 1908

Personal details
- Born: 26 June 1880 Salvador, Bahia, Empire of Brazil
- Died: 27 April 1964 (aged 83) Rio de Janeiro, Guanabara, Brazil
- Party: UDN (1945–1947); PSB (1947–1964)
- Spouse: Constança Mangabeira
- Parents: Francisco Cavalcanti Mangabeira (father); Augusta Cavalcanti Mangabeira (mother)
- Education: Free Faculty of Law of Bahia
- Occupation: jurist; politician; writer

João Mangabeira (26 June 1880 – 27 April 1964) was a Brazilian jurist, politician and writer.

== Biography ==
Mangabeira was the brother of medical doctor and poet Francisco Mangabeira, and politician Otávio Mangabeira. He was admitted to law school at 13 years of age, and despite belonging to a large family without financial resources, he managed to complete his course by the age of 17. He then began practicing law in Ilhéus, Bahia. According to Federal jurist and politician Paulo Brossard:

"When the annual session of the jury started, a poor defendant went on trial without a lawyer. The judge designated João Mangabeira as a defense lawyer. Mangabeira knew nothing about the process. Listening to the judge's report, he paid attention to everything: names, pages, details. As soon as the prosecutor concluded the indictment, the young defense lawyer, appointed minutes before, shattered the charge, pointing out contradictions, correcting names, indicating process pages that he did not handle at all. The defendant was acquitted ... and, thereafter, the city began to trust the lawyer who was no more than a child, and his office started to have clients."

Shortly after he became a congressman as a State Deputy and then as a Federal Deputy. He became a close associate of Rui Barbosa. In 1923, when Barbosa died, Mangabeira gave a speech in his honor. On the centenary of the birth of Barbosa in 1949, Mangabeira was the speaker of the House of Representatives.

In a short time he became one of the most prominent figures in the House of Representatives. Renowned as both congressman and lawyer, he came to be highly regarded for his intelligence.

Mangabeira's career included defending socialism. As deputy for the Constitutional Assembly of 1934, and his opposition to the Estado Novo dictatorship (Vargas Era) landed Mangabeira in prison for 15 months. "I'd rather get in jail by this dictatorship, than be free, agreeing with it," he said in 1936.
