= Francisco Mangabeira =

Francisco Cavalcanti Mangabeira (Salvador, 1879–1904) was a Brazilian medical doctor and writer, brother of João Mangabeira and Otávio Mangabeira. He was volunteer in Canudos Campaign as a medical student. Graduated as Medical Doctor in 1900. He took part in Salvador of the symbolist character movement New Crusade Group. His poets work are the most valid within the atmosphere symbolist.
