= Otávio Mangabeira =

Brazilian politician

- Born: August 27, 1886; Salvador, Bahia, Brazil
- Died: November 29, 1960 (aged 74); Rio de Janeiro, Rio de Janeiro (state), Brazil
- Occupations: engineer; professor; politician
- Parent(s): Francisco Cavalcanti Mangabeira; Augusta Cavalcanti Mangabeira

Otávio Mangabeira (27 August 1886 – 29 November 1960) was a Brazilian politician, professor, and engineer. He served as governor of Bahia, represented Bahia in the Senate of Brazil, and was the Minister of Foreign Affairs from 1926 to 1930.

He was the 23rd chair of the Brazilian Academy of Letters from 1930 until his death in 1960, when was succeeded by Jorge Amado.

== Biography ==
Otávio Mangabeira was the son of Francisco Cavalcanti Mangabeira, a poor pharmacist, and Augusta Mangabeira. His siblings included medical doctor and poet Francisco Mangabeira, and the politician João Mangabeira. Mangabeira was a mulatto, of Afro-Brazilian descent. He was the father of art critic and feminist Edyla Mangabeira Unger, and the grandfather of Roberto Mangabeira Unger.

Prior to his political career, Mangabeira was an astronomy professor at the Federal University of Bahia. He began his involvement in local and state politics in 1908.

Mangabeira was the Minister of Foreign Affairs from 1926 to 1930, in the administration of President Washington Luís. Towards the end of his first term, Washington and his entire cabinet were deposed by Getúlio Vargas in the Revolution of 1930.

Mangabeira advocated against the dictatorship and in favor of the return to democracy. He was repeatedly jailed in the 1930s for conspiring against the dictatorship, and then forced into exile in 1938, which he spent first in Europe and then in New York City. While in New York, he managed to financially supported himself and his family by working for Reader's Digest magazine to translate issues from English into Portuguese.

He returned to Brazil in 1945 upon the end of the Vargas dictatorship, was elected as a Federal Deputy in 1946, and elected as Governor of Bahia in 1947. He became a Senator representing Bahia in 1958, an office he served until his death in 1960. When American General Dwight Eisenhower visited Brazil in 1946, Mangabeira greeted him in Rio de Janeiro, and a famous photograph taken by Ibrahim Sued appeared to show Mangabeira kissing Eisenhower's hand in greeting; the image provoked intense public debate about Brazil's relationship to the United States. While Otávio was regarded as a member of the political center or center-left, his brother João was further to the Left.

In part as a consequence of his repeated exiles and imprisonments, Mangabeira spent most of his life with very little money, and "lacked, at the time of his death, the means to pay for his own burial."

The Octávio Mangabeira Stadium (also known as Fonte Nova Stadium), a major football stadium in Salvador, was built in 1951 and named in his honor. The stadium was replaced in 2010 by a larger and more modern stadium, the "Complexo Esportivo Cultural Professor Octávio Mangabeira," (also known as the Arena Fonte Nova), which was used to host the 2014 FIFA World Cup. A number of streets and public places throughout the state of Bahia are also named after Mangabeira.
