= National Petroleum Council (Brazil) =

Organization regulating the oil industry

The National Petroleum Council (Conselho Nacional do Petróleo or CNP) is a Brazilian organization that was established in 1938 to "supervise, regulate, and carry out the oil industry activities previously executed by the SFPM (de Oliveira, 2012) The SFPM (Service for Promotion of Mineral Production, according to de Oliveira) was a previous governmental organization established to encourage the search and production of minerals and oil but proved to fail. The CNP was headed by General Horta Barbosa and its first mission was to find oil in Bahia.
