= Catholic Electoral League =

Brazilian political party (1932–1937)

The Catholic Electoral League (LEC - Liga Eleitoral Catolica) was a Brazilian political pressure group functioning from 1932–1937 under the direct auspices of the Catholic Church. It was formed as part of a larger Church effort to "re-Catholicize" Brazil after a period of increased secularism and liberalism in Brazilian society in the aftermath of World War I.

== Historical Setting ==
In the late 1920s and early 1930s Brazil was beset by several crises. The Great Depression led to the crash of the coffee market in 1929, leading to a financial collapse in which much of the rural aristocracy lost most of their wealth. Society was becoming more urbanized, with large cities overtaking the more traditional rural regions in political influence. In 1930 a liberal, communist-backed revolution overthrew conservative president Washington Luís. The early populist policies of the new government under Getúlio Vargas (1930–1945) accelerated the decline of the traditional authority of the landed aristocracy and the Church.

In 1932, the upper classes from the state of São Paulo rebelled in an attempt to stop this political slide. Their Constitutionalist Revolution failed, but in response, Getúlio Vargas convoked a constitutional assembly to revamp the country's political organization.

== Foundation of the League ==
Realizing the importance of the upcoming constitutional assembly, Plinio Corrêa de Oliveira, with his friends Alceu de Amoroso Lima (a writer and recent convert to Catholicism) and Heitor da Silva Costa (architect of the famous statue of Christ the Redeemer in Rio de Janeiro), conceived the idea of the Catholic Electoral League. Its purposes would include providing voter guides so Catholics would know which candidates were more favorable to the Catholic cause. Cardinal Sebastião Leme, Archbishop of Rio de Janeiro and leader of the Brazilian bishops, sanctioned the plan, and soon the League was active all over Brazil.

The League's platform called for the reintroduction of obligatory religious instruction in public schools, the banning of divorce, civil recognition of religious marriage, and the establishment of chaplaincies in the armed forces and prisons. It also called for the right to vote for clergy, and state subsidies for the Catholic Church.

== Influence on the Constitution of 1934 ==
The League quickly embarked upon a campaign to ensure that delegates favorable to its positions would be elected to the 1933 constitutional assembly. The League screened candidates according to their commitment to traditional Catholic principles, and issued voter's guides with League recommendations. The League urged voters to support only candidates who were firmly loyal to the Church.

Olveira, now secretary-general of the Archdiocesan Board of the League in São Paulo, was chosen by Cardinal Duarte Leopoldo e Silva as a Catholic coalition candidate to the constitutional assembly. In the election, Olveira, then twenty-four years old, received more votes than any other candidate in Brazil, and nearly twice that of any other São Paulo candidate.

At the constitutional convention Olveira and other League-supported delegates were successful in incorporating the entirety of the League's platform into the new constitution of 1934.

Having so successfully accomplished its initial purposes, the League slowly fell out of prominence in the years following the constitutional assembly, and ceased to function after 1937.
