= 1934 Brazilian presidential election =

- 17 July 1934
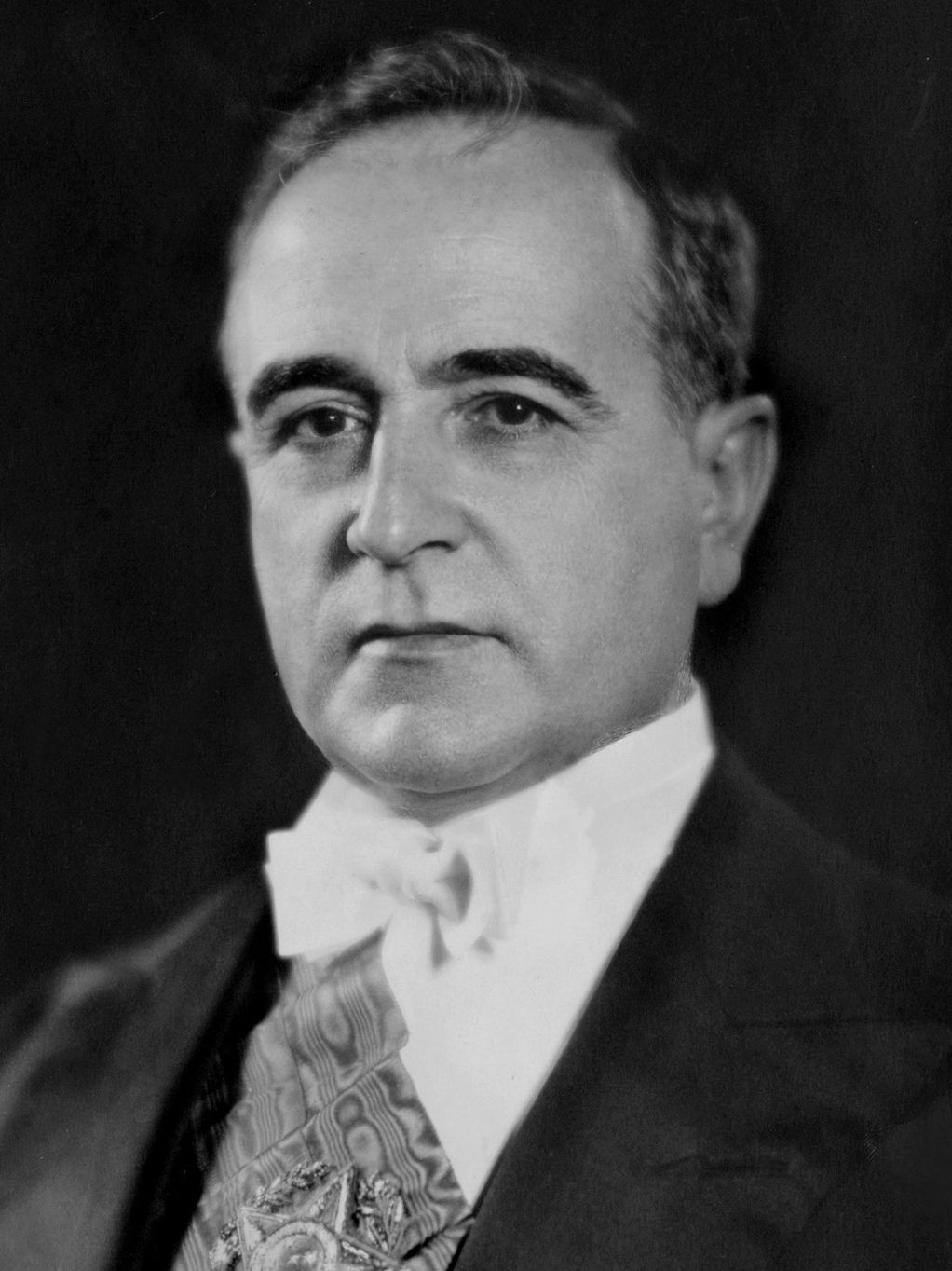

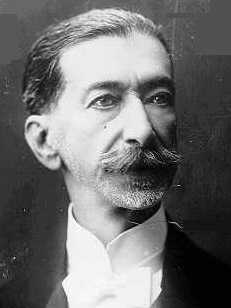
Nominee	Getúlio Vargas	Borges de Medeiros
Party	Independent	Independent
Electoral vote	175	59
Percentage	70.56%	23.79%
President before election
Getúlio Vargas
AL
Elected President
Getúlio Vargas
Independent

Indirect presidential elections were held in Brazil on 17 July 1934. Unlike previous elections which had been public (with the exception of the 1891 presidential election), this election was carried out by the Constituent Assembly. The result was a predictable victory for Getúlio Vargas, who received 175 of the 248 votes. The next elections did not take place until 1945, due to the Estado Novo dictatorship period.

== Results ==
Candidate	Votes	%
Getúlio Vargas	175	70.56
Borges de Medeiros	59	23.79
Pedro Aurélio de Góis Monteiro	4	1.61
Protógenes Guimarães	2	0.81
Raul Fernandes	1	0.40
Artur Bernardes	1	0.40
Plínio Salgado	1	0.40
Antônio Carlos Ribeiro de Andrada	1	0.40
Afrânio de Melo Franco	1	0.40
Oscar Weinschenck	1	0.40
Paim Filho	1	0.40
Levi Carneiro	1	0.40
Total	248	100.00
