= National Security Law (Brazil) =

1983 Brazilian law

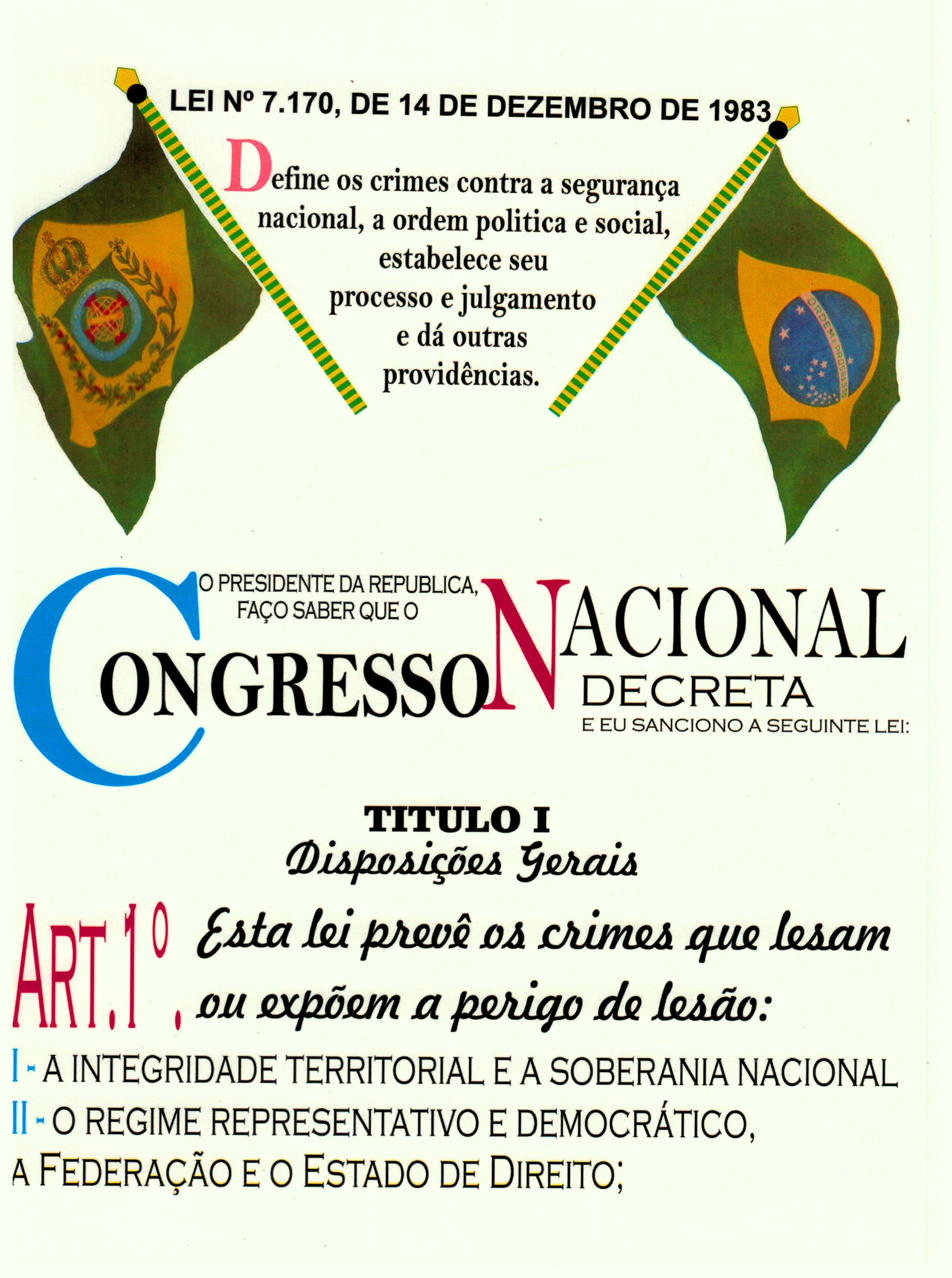
- Preamble of the Brazilian National Security Law.

National Congress
- Territorial extent: Brazil
- Signed by: João Figueiredo
- Signed: December 14, 1983
- Commenced: December 15, 1983
- Repealed: 1 December 2021
- Administered by: Federal government

Amends
- National Security Act of 1978 (Law No. 6,620 of December 17, 1978)

Repealed by
- Law No. 14,197 of September 1, 2021

Summary
- Defines crimes against national security, political and social order, establishes their procedure and judgment, and makes other provisions.
- Status: Repealed

The National Security Law was a Brazilian law that sought to guarantee the national security of the State against the subversion of law and order. It was revoked in 2021 by Law No. 14,197, though its provisions relating to national security and the defense of the democratic rule of law — including crimes against national sovereignty such as attacks on the nation's sovereignty, threats to national integrity, and espionage — were incorporated into the Brazilian Penal Code.

== History ==
Since the Empire of Brazil, there has been legislation on national security. This framework was updated over time, and the National Security Law (LSN), or Law No. 7,170 of 14 December 1983, defined crimes against national security, political order, and social order, and corresponding trial procedures and judgments.

The law became more frequently applied in 2020. In April 2021, Attorney General Augusto Aras stated that he would not investigate president Jair Bolsonaro for using the National Security Law against critics and opponents, arguing that he was not responsible for the actions of junior officials.

In May 2021, the Chamber of Deputies approved a bill repealing the law and adding new "crimes against democracy", such as a carrying out a coup d'état or interrupting elections, to the Penal Code. The Federal Senate approved the bill in July 2021, and it was sanctioned, with vetoes, by the President of the Republic in September 2021.

== Crimes against national security ==
Under the Brazilian legal system, the law outlined crimes that could harm national security or expose it to the risk of injury:

- Against territorial integrity and national sovereignty: acts seeking to dismember part of the national territory to create an independent country were punishable by imprisonment of 4 to 12 years;
- Inciting individuals from another country to invade national territory was punishable by imprisonment of 3 to 10 years, with the penalty doubled if the invasion occurred;
- Targeting the heads of the Union’s Powers — the legislative, executive, and judiciary — was also criminalized.

== See also ==
- Ministry of Defence
