= Hans Kloss =

Hans Kloss may refer to:

- Hans Kloss (bank manager) (1905–1986), Austrian bank manager and lawyer
- Hans Kloss (artist) (1938–2018), German painter and graphic artist
- Hans Kloss, a fictional World War II secret agent from the television series Stawka większa niż życie
  - Hans Kloss (video game), a 1992 unofficial computer game featuring the character
