= Skaut Kwatermaster =

1995 video game by L.K. Avalon

- Publisher: LK Avalon
- Platforms: Amiga, DOS
- Release: 1995
- Genre: Adventure

Skaut Kwatermaster is a 1995 Polish adventure game by LK Avalon for Amiga and DOS.

The player must rescue a Girl Guide who has become trapped inside a tank at an air base. The game's wacky graphical style and silly jokes are inspired by Day of the Tentacle. The game's title is the Polish ortographic transcription of the English phrase "scout quartermaster". The game was awarded the Golden Disk, by the monthly magazine Świat Gier Komputerowych.

PPA felt the game represented a clever idea executed very well. Gry Online wrote that while the game is technically proficient, it is next to unplayable in reality due to illogical narrative and puzzles. The book Bajty Polskie drew comparisons with Day of the Tentacle.

In 2017, the game along with Sołtys and A.D. 2044 were uploaded to GOG.com.
