= Amalie Seidel =

Austrian politician (1876–1952)

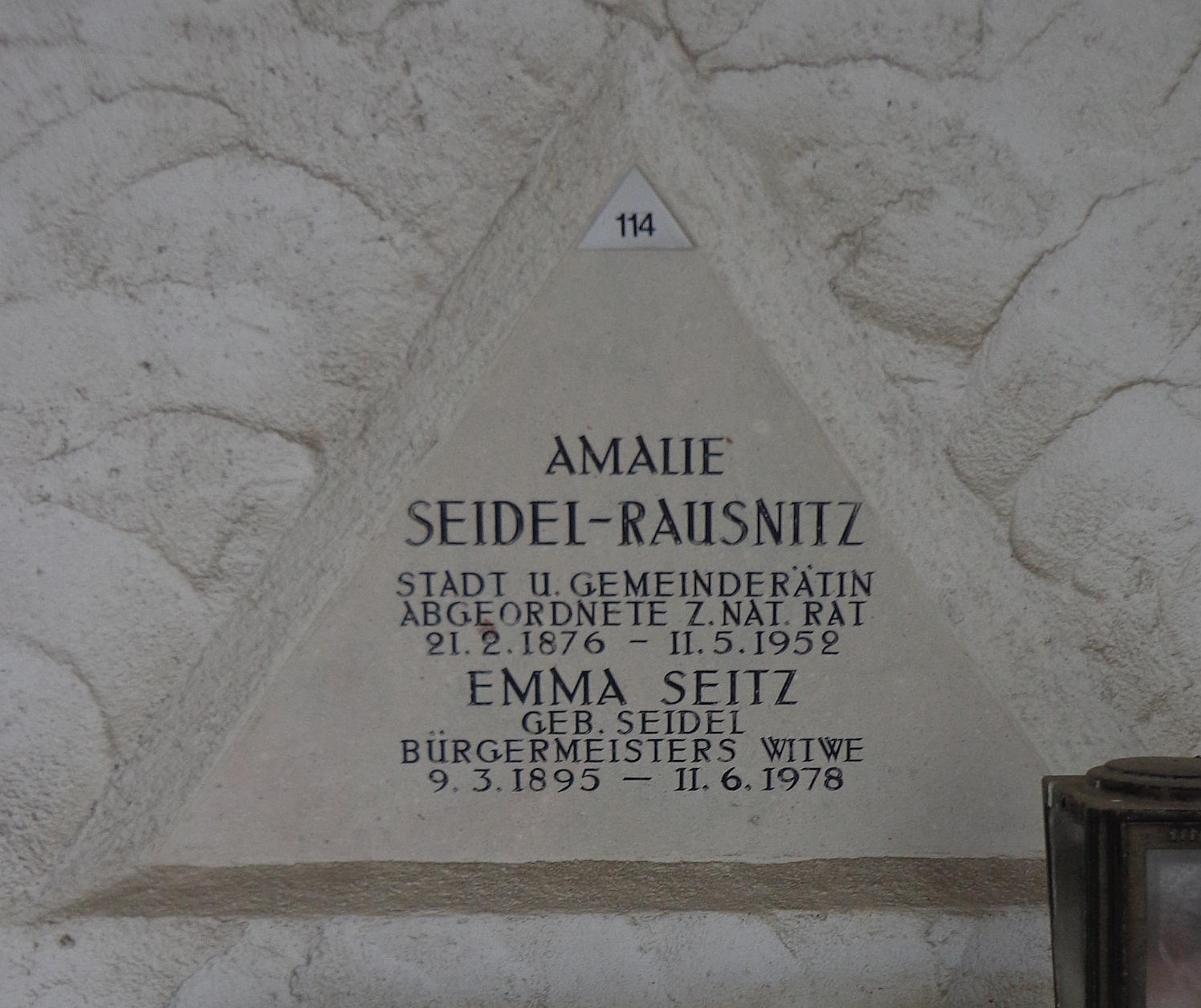
Feuerhalle Simmering, grave of Amalie Seidel and Emma Seitz

Amalie Seidel (21 February 1876 in Vienna – 11 May 1952) was an Austrian politician (Social Democrat) and feminist. She was one of the first of her gender in the Austrian parliament.

Born Amalie Ryba, she was the daughter of a locksmith. She was active in the working movement from the 1890s, and organised the first strike of female workers in Austria. She was also active in the women's movement and an editor of the paper Libertas. In 1895 she married the engineer Richard Seidel, with whom she had two daughters, but the marriage did not last. In 1900, she became chairperson of the local women's committee and from 1902 chairperson of the national women's committee. In 1919, Seidel became one of the first eight women in the Austrian parliament, where she sat until 1934. She focused on children and health care, and especially the abuse of foster children by private foster parents, and worked closely to Julius Tandler. After the coup of 1934, she was imprisoned for one month and lost her place in the parliament. However, she used her home for illegal meetings for socialist women, and in 1942, she married the Jew Sigmund Rausnitz in order to protect him from Nazi prosecution. She was briefly imprisoned after the attempted murder on Adolf Hitler in 1944.

Her daughter Emma married Karl Seitz, the President of the National Council and Mayor of Vienna. Emma Seitz and Amalie Seidel-Rausnitz were cremated at Feuerhalle Simmering, where also their ashes are interred.

== Sources ==
- Edith Probst (Hrsg.): Die Partei hat mich nie enttäuscht. Österreichische Sozialdemokratinnen. Verlag für Gesellschaftskritik, Wien 1989
- Felix Czeike: Historisches Lexikon Wien vol. 5. Kremayr & Scheriau, Wien 1997
