= Friedrich Knauer =

Friedrich Knauer may refer to:

- Friedrich Knauer (chemist) (1897–?), German physical chemist
- Friedrich Knauer (zoologist) (1850–1926), Austrian zoologist
