= Rudolf Kraus =

Austrian pathologist, bacteriologist and immunologist

Rudolf Kraus (31 October 1868 – 15 July 1932) was an Austrian pathologist, bacteriologist and immunologist known for his work with bacterial precipitins.

== Biography ==
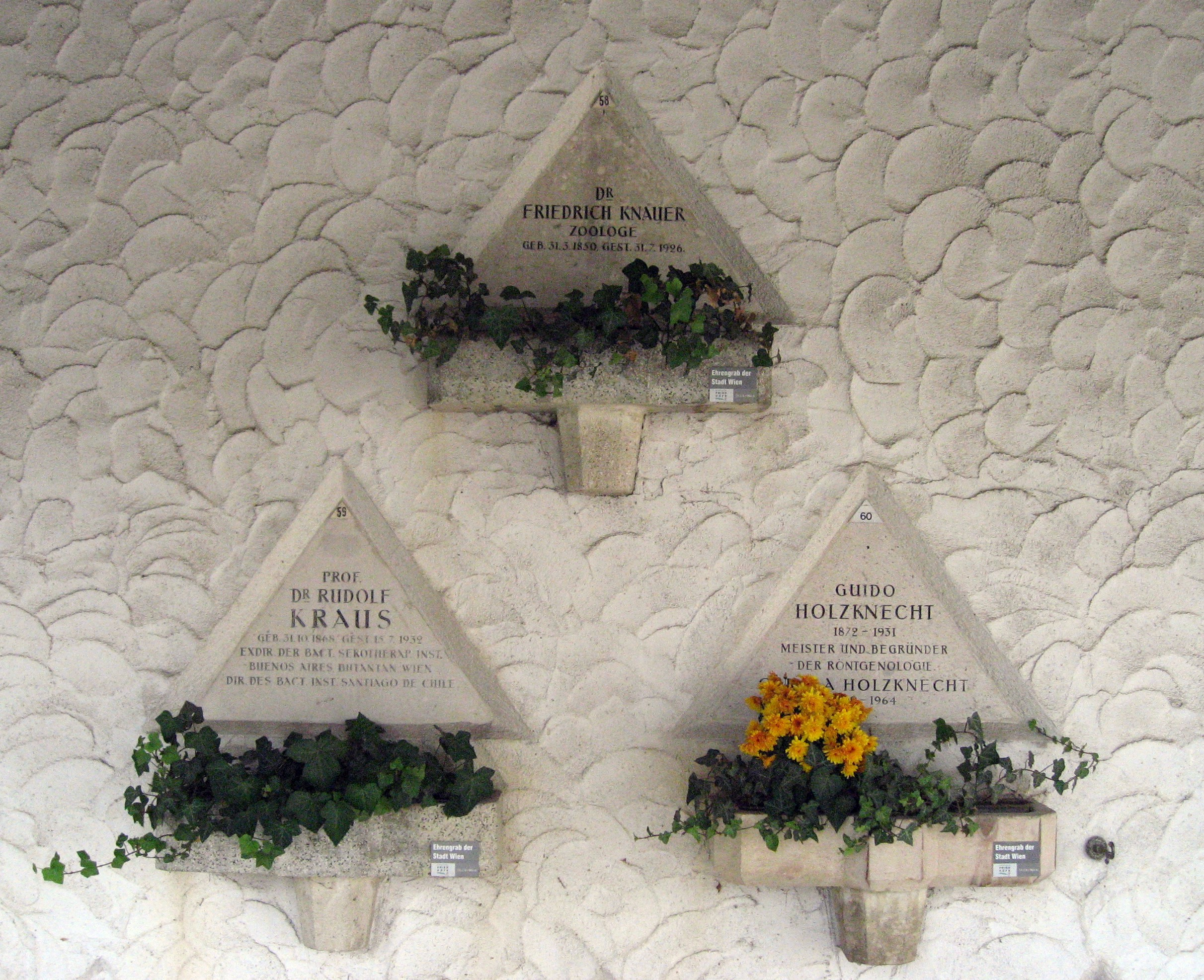
Urn niches of Guido Holzknecht, Rudolf Kraus and Friedrich Knauer at Feuerhalle Simmering in Vienna

Kraus was born on 31 October 1868 in Mladá Boleslav in Bohemia, Austria-Hungary. In 1893, he obtained his doctorate at the University of Prague. Following studies at the Pasteur Institute in Paris, he settled in Vienna in 1895 as an assistant to Richard Paltauf at the serotherapeutic institute. In 1901 he became a privat-docent for general and experimental pathology, followed by a promotion as associate professor in 1906. In 1908 he traveled to Saint Petersburg, where he conducted investigations of an epidemic of cholera.

Shortly before the outbreak of World War I, he moved to South America. In 1921 he was appointed director of the institute of bacteriology in Buenos Aires, and after a period of time in São Paulo, he returned to Vienna in 1924 as head of the serotherapeutic institute. In 1929, he was named director of the Istituto bacteriologico de Chile in Santiago, Chile.

With August Paul von Wassermann, he was co-founder of the Free Association for Microbiology.

He died on 15 July 1932 in Santiago.

== Selected writings ==
- "Ueber spezifische Reaktionen in keimfreien Filtraten aus Cholera-Typhus-Pestbouillonculturen erzeugt durch homologes Serum" [On specific reactions in germ-free filtrates from cholera typhoid plague broth cultures produced by homologous serum]. Wiener klinische Wochenschrift (in German). 10 (32): 736–739. 1897.
- Handbuch der Technik und Methodik der Immunitätsforschung (with Constantin Levaditi), 1908-09 - Handbook of technology and methodology for immunization research.
- Handbuch der Immunitätsforschung und experimentellen Therapie, mit besonderer Berücksichtigung der Technik und Methodik, 1914 - Handbook of immunization research and experimental therapy, etc.
- Die Cholera asiatica und die Cholera nostras, 1914 - Cholera Asiatica and cholera nostras.
- Handbuch der mikrobiologischen Technik, (with Paul Uhlenhuth), 1923–24 – Handbook of microbiological techniques.
- 10 jahre Südamerika; vorträge über epidemiologie und infektionskrankheiten der menschen und tiere, 1927 – Ten years in South America, Lessons on epidemiology and infectious diseases of humans and animals.
- Giftschlangen und die Serumbehandlung der Schlangenbisse, 1931 - Poisonous snakes and serum treatment for snake bites.
