= Schloss Neugebäude =

Austrian castle

Coordinates: 48°09′37″N 16°26′37″E

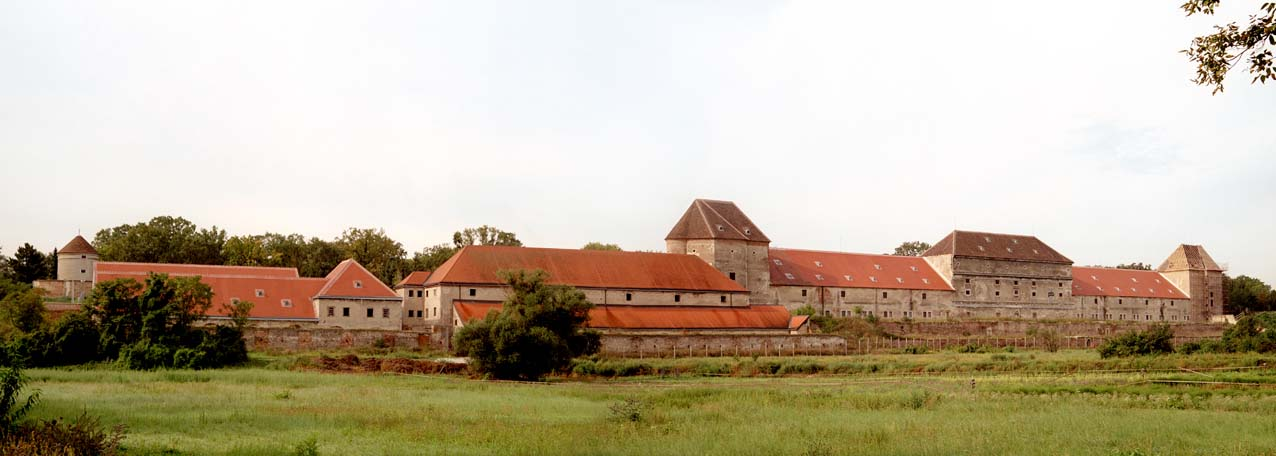
Main building, 2005 condition

Neugebäude Palace (German: Schloss Neugebäude) is a large Mannerist castle complex in the Simmering district of Vienna, Austria. It was built from 1569 onwards at the behest of the Habsburg Emperor Maximilian II. The site of the palace is said to be where the Ottoman Sultan Suleiman the Magnificent's tent was erected during the 1529 Siege of Vienna. The palace was modeled after it.

It fell into disuse in the 17th century and today stands in ruins. Protected as a historical monument Since the 1970s, various efforts have been made to restore the site.

In 1922, Clemens Holzmeister's architectural designs for Austria's first crematorium placed Feuerhalle Simmering into the walled gardens of the derelict Schloss Neugebäude, thus putting the former palace gardens with its many ancient trees (designated natural monuments) to new use as an urn burial ground.
