= Friedrich Knauer (zoologist) =

Austrian zoologist (1850–1926)

Friedrich Carl Knauer (31 March 1850, Graz – 31 July 1926, Vienna) was an Austrian zoologist.

Friedrich Knauer studied physics, chemistry and zoology at the University of Vienna from 1868 to 1872. In 1887, he became a director Vivarium in Vienna Prater. In 1893, he became the director of Vienna Zoo.

Knauer wrote zoological books for schools and instruction in science as well as popular scientific works. After his death, Knauer's ashes were buried at Feuerhalle Simmering. In 1930, a street in Favoriten was named Friedrich Knauer Gasse.

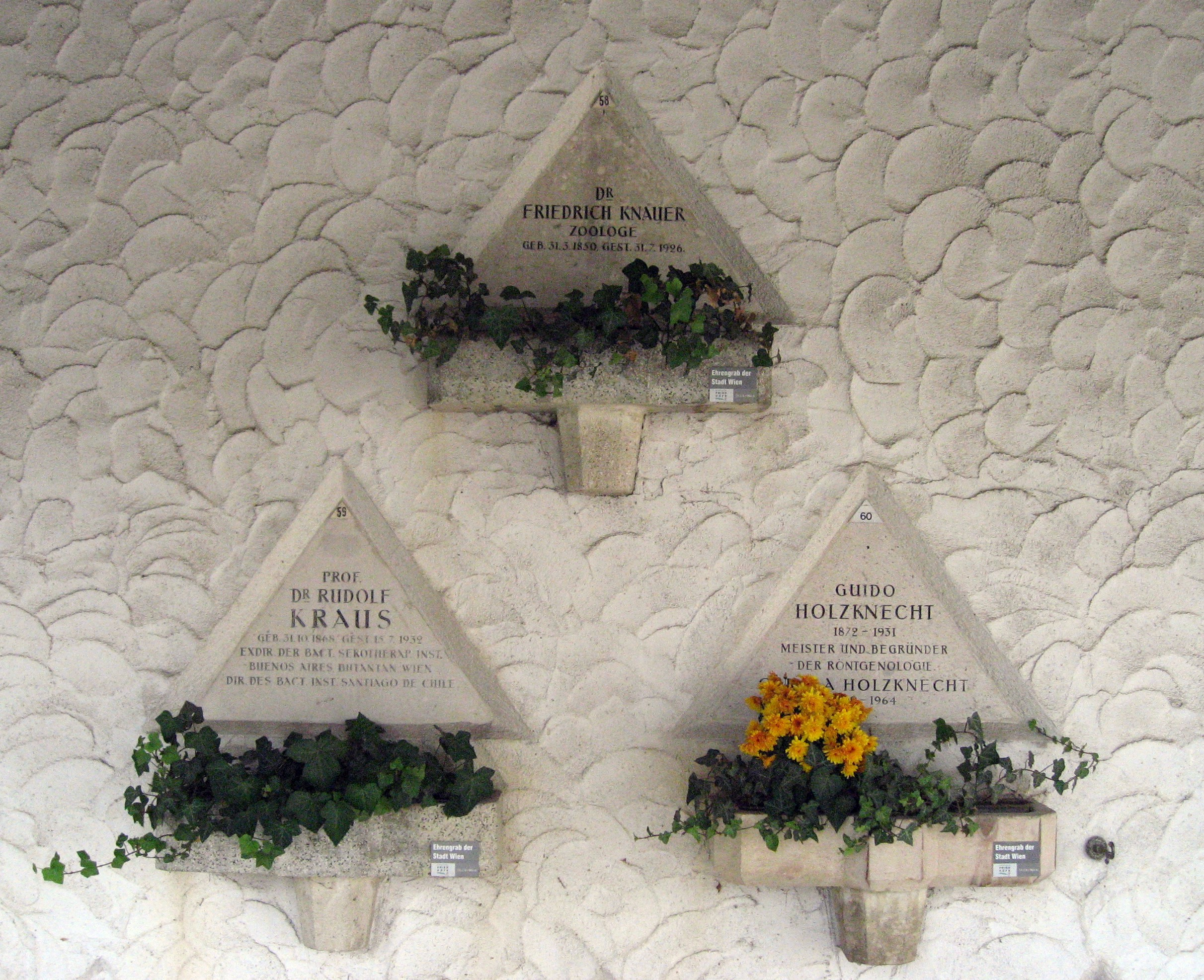
Urn niches of Guido Holzknecht, Rudolf Kraus and Friedrich Knauer at Feuerhalle Simmering in Vienna.

== Works ==
- Die bauende Thierwelt. Beschreibung der wichtigeren Thierbaue nach fremden und eigenen Beobachtungen. Pichler, Wien o.J.
- Die fremdländischen Amphibien und Reptilien. Frankreich, Spanien, Italien, Griechenland, Rußland, Afrika. Für den Naturfreund beschrieben. Wien o.J.
- Die Reptilien und Amphibien Nieder-Oesterreichs. Eine faunistische Skizze. Wien 1875
- Amphibien- und Reptilienzucht. Köhler, Wien 1875
- Beobachtungen an Reptilien und Amphibien in der Gefangenschaft. Hölder, Wien 1875
- Fang der Amphibien und Reptilien und deren Conservierung für Schulzwecke. Hölder, Wien 1875
- Unsere Kenntnisse von der Entstehung und dem Baue des Chlorophyll`s und dessen Rolle im Pflanzenleben. Hölder, Wien 1875
- Die alte Grenzscheide zwischen Thier- und Pflanzenwelt und deren Umsturz durch die moderne Naturwissenschaft. Hölder, Wien 1876
- Deutschlands und Österreichs Reptilien. Pichler, Wien 1877
- Europas Kriechtiere und Lurche. Pichler, Wien 1877
- Naturgeschichte der Lurche (Amphibiologie). Pichler, Wien 1878
- Naturgeschichte des Thierreiches. Lehr- und Lesebuch für die unteren Klassen der Gymnasien. Pichler, Wien 1878
- Ein Ausflug nach Schönbrunn. Selbstverlag, Wien 1879
- Deutschlands und Österreichs Amphibien. Für den Naturfreund beschrieben und nach ihrem Leben beschrieben. Pichler, Wien 1881
- Handwörterbuch der Zoologie. Enke, Stuttgart 1887
- Zur Gründung eines großen zoologischen Gartens in Wien. 1. Wiener Vereinsbuchdruckerei, Wien 1891
- Schönbrunn. Belehrender Führer. Lechner, Wien 1898
- Zwiegestalt der Geschlechter in der Thierwelt (Dimorphismus). Teubner, Leipzig 1907
- Vogelschutz und Federnindustrie. Eine Streitfrage. Braumüller, Wien 1914
- Menschenaffen. Ihr Frei- und Gefangenleben. Thomas, Leipzig, um 1915
- Naturschutztage. Anregungen zur Erziehung unserer Jugend zum Naturschutz für Eltern und Lehrer. Thomas, Leipzig 1916
- Waldgänge. Unseren Jungwanderern zur Anregung und Belehrung. Jugendverlag Eckarthaus, Wien 1924
