= Elfriede Blauensteiner =

Austrian serial killer

- Born: Elfriede Martha Blauensteiner; 22 January 1931; Vienna, Austria
- Died: 16 November 2003 (aged 72)
- Other name: The Black Widow
- Conviction: Murder (3 counts)
- Penalty: Life imprisonment

Details
- Victims: 3–10+
- Country: Austria
- Date apprehended: January 1996

Elfriede Martha Blauensteiner (22 January 1931 – 16 November 2003), dubbed The Black Widow, was an Austrian serial killer who murdered at least three victims by poison. In each case, she inherited the victim's possessions.

== Crimes ==
Blauensteiner was a compulsive gambler who sought out wealthy, elderly men through newspaper personal advertisements, took them into her care, and had her lawyer falsify their wills before poisoning them to inherit their estates. She gambled away the proceeds in casinos, losing 15 million schilling at one casino alone. She killed using the diabetes drug Euglucon in combination with an antidepressant, inducing fatal hypoglycemia. Investigators noted that she became practiced enough to predict when a victim would die, summoning emergency services only when death was imminent.

On 7 March 1997, Blauensteiner was found guilty of murdering 77-year-old Alois Pichler and sentenced to life imprisonment. During her trial in Krems, Blauensteiner drew attention for her theatrical conduct, at one point holding up a golden crucifix and declaring "Ich wasche meine Hände in Unschuld" ("I wash my hands of this"), a reference to Pontius Pilate. Her former lawyer Harald Schmidt was jailed for seven years for being an accomplice to grievous bodily harm and for forging the will of Alois Pichler.

Four years later, she was found guilty of murdering her 64-year-old husband Friedrich Doecker and 84-year-old female neighbour Franziska Koeberl. Although she was only convicted of a total of three murders, Austrian police believe that she may have murdered at least 10 people. Koeberl is believed to have been her only female victim.

After serving less than seven years of her life sentence, Blauensteiner died from a brain tumour on 16 November 2003, in a Vienna hospital. She was cremated at Feuerhalle Simmering, where her ashes were also buried.

== See also ==
- List of serial killers by country
- List of medical and pseudo-medical serial killers
