= Heartlight (video game) =

1990 video game

- Developer(s): X LanD Computer Games, Janusz Pelc
- Publisher(s): X LanD Computer Games; Epic MegaGames (MS-DOS)
- Platform(s): Amiga, Atari 8-bit, MS-DOS, Android, iOS, Browser
- Release: POL: 1990 (Atari 8-bit); NA: 1994 (MS-DOS); WW: 1993 (Amiga); WW: March 21, 2012 (iOS, Android); WW: 2020 (Browser)
- Genre(s): Puzzle
- Mode(s): Single-player

Heartlight is a puzzle video game originally developed by Janusz Pelc for the Atari 8-bit computers in 1990. In 1994, an MS-DOS port (Heartlight PC) was published by Epic MegaGames along with two other games by Janusz Pelc in the Epic Puzzle Pack. The shareware version has 20 levels and the full version (Heartlight Deluxe) has 70 levels. In 2006, Maciej Miąsik, co-author of the MS-DOS version, released it under the Creative Commons CC BY-SA 2.5 license as freeware. The source code became available too. In 2020, a web browser remake was released with updated graphics.

== Gameplay ==
The game is set on a 12×20 square grid, with similar game mechanics to Boulder Dash and Supaplex. The object of the game is to help the elf Percival collect all the hearts on each level and get to the exit door. Different objects with unique characteristics aim to make reaching this goal more complex. The game is neither timed nor limited to a certain number of lives, but there is no Save feature. Objects in the levels include bombs, rocks, and hearts. While hearts are one of the goals, they can also fall on and kill Percival. Bombs blow up when squashed or dropped on a hard surface. Rocks squash Percival and can blow up bombs.

== Reception ==
Computer Gaming World's Chuck Miller in June 1994 praised Heartlight as "a delightful logic-based game offering a good mix of arcade action and conundrums". "Game play is so addictive", he said, that the "just average" graphics and sound were not noticeable. Miller concluded that "this is one diversion that will keep you coming back for more". The game was later released as part of the Epic Puzzle Pack (with Robbo and Electro) which was reviewed in 1994 in Dragon #206 by Sandy Petersen in the "Eye of the Monitor" column. Petersen gave the compilation 3 out of 5 stars.

=== Reviews ===
- PC Joker (October 1993)
