= Elisabeth Ruttkay =

Hungarian archaeologist and prehistorian

- Born: Erzsébet Kiss; 18 June 1926; Pécs, Kingdom of Hungary
- Died: 25 February 2009 (aged 82); Vienna, Austria
- Other names: Elisabeth Ruttkay-Hanák, Elisabeth Hanák-Ruttkay
- Occupation: archaeologist
- Years active: 1962-2009
- Known for: Neolithic and Bronze Age studies in Austria

Elisabeth Ruttkay (18 June 1926 – 25 February 2009) was a Hungarian-born, naturalized Austrian citizen, who was an archaeologist specializing in New Stone Age and Bronze Age studies in Austria. She was the winner of both the Lower Austria Promotion Prize and the Austrian Cross of Honour for Science and Art.

== Early life ==
Erzsébet Kiss was born on 18 June 1926 in Pécs, Kingdom of Hungary. Kiss married Zoltan von Ruttkay in 1943 at the age of 17 and graduated from high school the following year. She studied Hungarian language and literature at Pázmány Péter Catholic University and later at Eötvös Loránd University in Budapest, earning her diploma.

== Career ==
After graduating, Ruttkay went to work at the Pázmány Péter University under professor Miklós Zsiray at the university's Institute for Finno-Ugric Languages, until Zsiray's death in 1955. The following year, she and her husband left Hungary and moved to Austria, where she spent two years as director at the Hungarian Gymnasium in Innsbruck. In 1958, she resumed her studies, under professor Richard Pittioni at the University of Vienna, studying prehistory, early history and art history. After her matriculation, Ruttkay applied for Austrian citizenship and was naturalized in 1961. The following year, she began working at the National Museum of Burgenland in Eisenstadt, where she remained for six years.

In 1968, Ruttkay went to work at the Vienna Museum of Natural History, initially inventorying and packaging artifacts for the Prehistoric Department. In 1970, she began archaeological investigations at Jennyberg near Mödling, focusing on the Neolithic development of Central Europe. That same year, she wrote a report about a New Stone Age chert mining community at Antonshöhe near Mauer, which was one of the first industrial complexes in Lower Austria and the only known deep-shaft mine in the country from the period. In the early 1970s, Ruttkay began excavations at Prellenkirchen, which sparked interest in a systematic evaluation of Austria's Linear Pottery culture (German: Linearbandkeramik Kulture (LBK)). She coined the term "Vornotenkopfkeramik" (Before music note ceramics) in 1976, to refer to the oldest LBK groups known in Austria, and it referred to potters who used simple linear decoration, tempering their pots with plant matter.

Completing her doctorate in Philosophy 1979, with a dissertation of Das Neolithikum mit bemalter Keramik in Österreich. Eine chronologisch–kulturhistorische Untersuchung (The Neolithic painted ceramics in Austria. A chronological-cultural-historical study, 1978) from the University of Vienna, Ruttkay continued her research into a time-line for Austrian prehistoric cultures. Her studies included many cultural groups, such as the Moravian-Eastern Austrian Group of painted pottery (German: Mährisch-Ostösterreichische Gruppe der Bemaltkeramik (MOG)) in 1979, the Moravian-Austrian Baalberger Group (German: Mährisch-Österreichische Baalberger Gruppe) in 1979 and again in 1989 and the Bronze Age Attersee Group (German: Bronzezeitliche Attersee-Gruppe) in 1981, among others. The Attersee Group and Mondsee Culture lived along the lake shores of Upper Austria and their pottery was characterized by designs of arcs, lines and chevron bands, sun discs and triangles. Ruttkay's study of the Mondsee was one of the most relevant works on the culture and established a chronology still in use, which was later confirmed with radiocarbon dating.

In 1982, Ruttkay's husband died after a lengthy illness. The following year, she was appointed to the High Counselor of the Prehistory Department, becoming the director of the library at the museum. In 1983, Ruttkay married the philosopher Tibor Hanák, one of the main editors for Radio Free Europe, who she had known since her teaching days in Innsbruck. During her tenure as library director, between 4000 and 5000 new books were added to the collection on prehistoric topics. She retired from the Department in 1991, but continued her research, completing analysis of the Wachberg phase (German: Fazies Wachberg) in 1995 and Neusiedl phase (German: Fazies Neusiedl) in 2002. Until her death, she continued publishing works on Austrian cultural development.

== Death and legacy ==
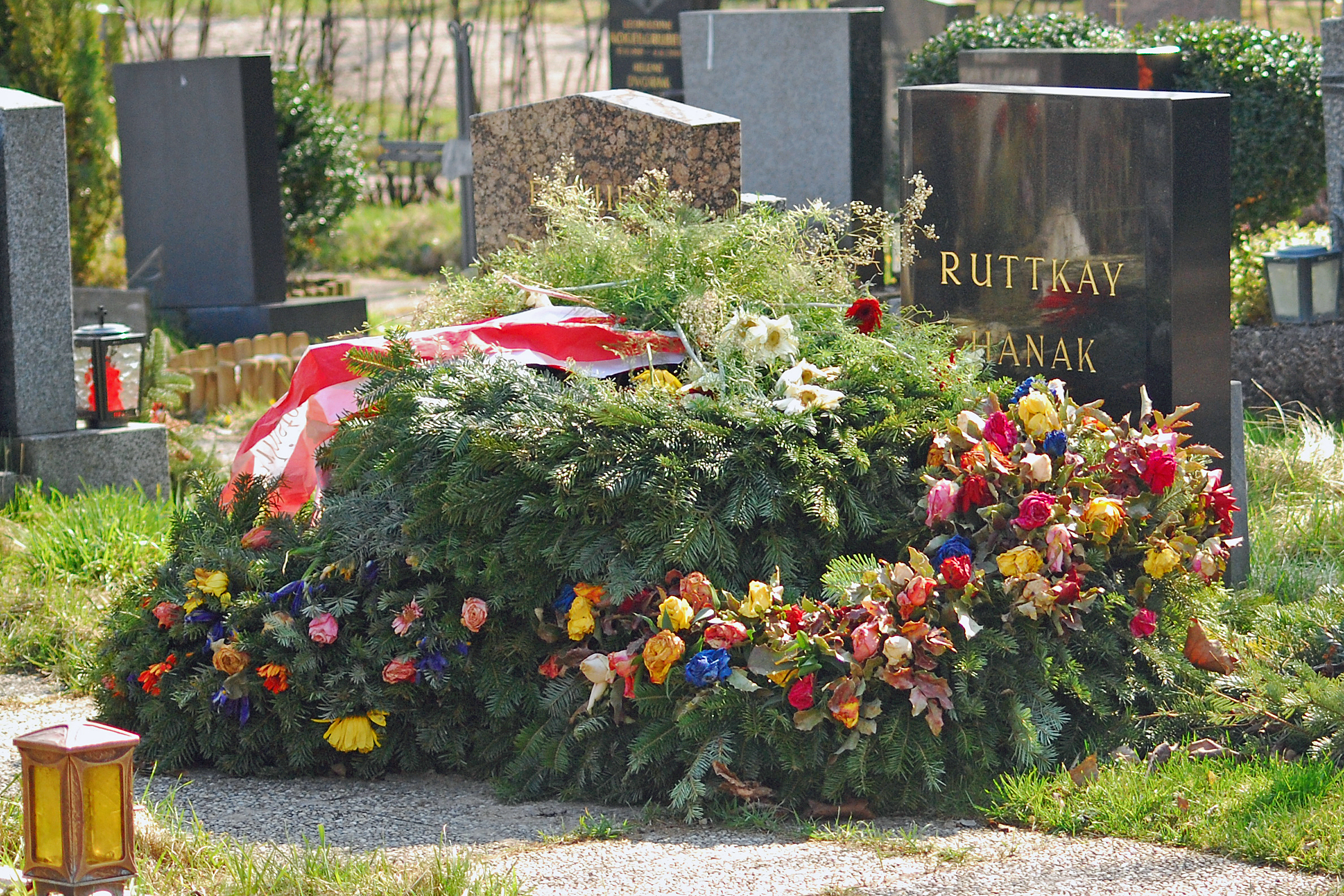
Grave of Elisabeth Ruttkay, Feuerhalle Simmering, Vienna

Prehistory professor Johannes-Wolfgang Neugebauer dubbed Ruttkay the "grande dame of Austrian Neolithic research". Her contributions to the study of the Austrian Neolithic Age were recognized by many awards including receipt of the Lower Austria Promotion Prize (German: Förderungspreis Niederösterreichs), which recognizes contributions to the development of Lower Austria, in 1987 and receipt of the Austrian Cross of Honour for Science and Art the following year. Ruttkay died on 25 February 2009 in Vienna and was cremated at Feuerhalle Simmering, where also her ashes are buried.
