= Sołtys (video game) =

1995 video game

- Publisher: LK Avalon
- Platforms: MS-DOS, Amiga
- Release: 1995
- Genre: Adventure

Sołtys (English: Mayor (Note: More accurately, mayor of a village)) is a Polish point and click adventure game by LK Avalon which was released for MS-DOS on May 23, 1995.

== Plot ==
The player is the head of a village called Poraż, who must convince Leon, the husband-to-be of the player's daughter, to return to the wedding that he has run away from.

== Development ==
Computer Laboratory Avalon began life in 1989 as a garage company by two nineteen-year-olds (Tomasz Pazdan and Janusz Pelc) out of their flat in Rzeszów. Their first title was Robbo, and they had issues with distribution, recording the game on second-hand cassettes which they bought from a bookstore and recorded over, and finances. Managing to survive thanks to a large order from Centralna Składnica Harcerska (central depot of the Polish Scouting Association), 6 years later they decided to make Sołtys.

The developers chose to use typical local humour that Polish players would appreciate, which could be useful in solving some puzzles.

Sołtys was released as freeware in November 2011, at the ScummVM website, in both Polish and English.

== Reception ==
Gry Online gave particular praise to the game's cartoony graphical style. Galu wrote that the games puzzles were more logical than those of its LucasArts predecessors, but that this was its only positive.
