= Manfred Ackermann =

Austrian politician (1898–1991)

- Born: November 1, 1898; Mikulov, Moravia, Czech Republic
- Died: June 16, 1991 (aged 92); Vienna, Austria
- Occupations: Politician; Trade unionist
- Organization: Social Democratic Party of Austria
- Movement: Socialism
- Spouse: Paula Popp
- Awards: Decoration of Honour for Services to the Republic of Austria (1969); Decoration for Services to the Liberation of Austria (1977)
- Military career
- Allegiance: Austria
- Conflicts: World War I

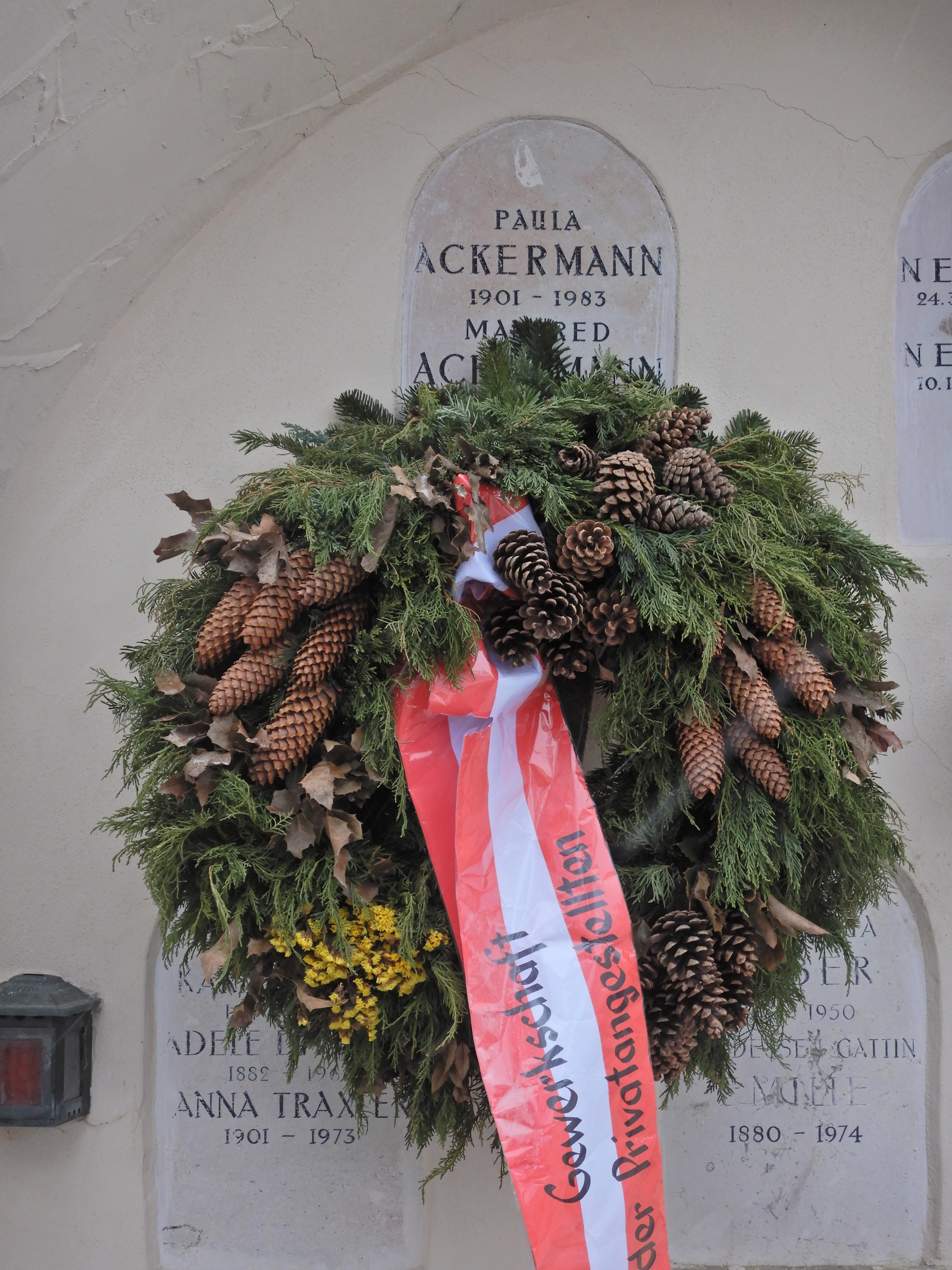
Feuerhalle Simmering, Ackermann family grave

Manfred Ackermann (1 November 1898 – 16 June 1991) was an Austrian Social Democratic politician and trade union official in Austria and the United States.

Ackermann served in the Austrian forces during World War I. After returning to civilian life, he became involved in trade union activities and the Sozialdemokratische Arbeiterpartei (SDAP).

The SDAP was banned in the 1930s, and Ackermann was arrested in March 1934, after the Austrian Civil War, and held until summer, 1935 in Wöllersdorf detention camp. He was re-arrested in November 1937 as a result of working illegally and held until Schuschnigg's general amnesty in March 1938.

After the Anschluss of Austria by Germany in 1938, Ackermann was, as a Socialist and a Jew, forced to flee the Nazis. After passing through Italy, Switzerland and Belgium, he lived in Paris, but in 1939 he was imprisoned by the French in Colombes and Montargis. He was subsequently able to go, via Spain and Portugal, to the United States, where he worked and was again active in trades unions.

Ackermann retired in 1964 and returned to Austria. He lectured there until his death in 1991 and was one of the initiators of the Contact Committee of the Federation of Socialist Youth freedom fighters. His urn is held at Feuerhalle Simmering in Vienna.

Manfred Ackermann was married to Paula Popp.

== Honours and awards ==
- Decoration of Honour in Silver for Services to the Republic of Austria (1969)
- Golden Badge of the federal socialist freedom fighters and victims of fascism (1970)
- Title of Professor (1973)
- Victor Adler medal of the SPÖ (1973)
- Decoration for Services to the Liberation of Austria (1977)
- appointed in 1928 built from plans by Karl Badstieber housing complex in Vienna Brigittenau Brigittaplatz 11–13, in Manfred Ackermann court (2008)
- Charles Pick medal the Trade section of the GPA
