= LK Avalon =

Polish video game studio

- Company type: Private
- Industry: Video games
- Founded: 1989; 37 years ago
- Founder: Tomasz Pazdan; Janusz Pelc
- Headquarters: Świlcza, Rzeszów, Poland
- Key people: Mirosław Liminowicz (CEO)
- Products: Robbo; A.D. 2044; Schizm: Mysterious Journey
- Website: Official website

Laboratorium Komputerowe Avalon (lit. "Avalon Computer Laboratory"), abbreviated LK Avalon, was a Polish software developer and distributor, with product range encompassing video games, educational software and other applications.

== History ==
The company was founded in mid-1989 by 19 years old schoolmates Tomasz Pazdan and Janusz Pelc, fresh after passing their matura exams, in order to publish Pelc's Atari 8-bit computer game Robbo. In 1990 Mirosław Liminowicz joined the company, and replaced Pelc as partner in the company when the latter left Avalon the same year.

LK Avalon followed the success of Robbo with other games and applications for the Atari XL/XE. Initially publishing software developed in-house, such as Pelc's Misja and Liminowicz's Fred and Lasermania, later the company also published games created by other developers.

In late 1991, Avalon made a deal with Zeppelin Games, who would license the company's games Misja and Fred for release in Western Europe. In exchange, Avalon licensed several Atari 8-bit games by Zeppelin for publication in Poland, starting around October 1992. Avalon's software was also distributed in Germany by KE-Soft and in the Netherlands by ANG Software.

Besides software, Avalon was also responsible for publishing Tajemnice Atari, a magazine for Atari computer enthusiasts. It contained type-in listings of Atari programs, solutions and maps for Polish video games, and promotion of software published by LK Avalon. Launched in May 1991, Tajemnice Atari lasted until October 1993.

In the mid-1990s LK Avalon branched out to other computer platforms, publishing games first for the Commodore 64, then the Amiga and PC, with the Microsoft Windows market being the company's focus since the 2000s.

== Software ==
- Robbo (1989)
- Misja - arcade (1990)
- Fred - arcade (1990)
- Lasermania (1990)
- A.D. 2044 (Atari 8-bit) (1991)
- Chaos Music Composer (1991)
- Hans Kloss (1992)
- Smuś (1993)
- CyberKick (1994)
- Vicky (1994)
- Mega Blast (1995)
- Sołtys (1995)
- Skaut Kwatermaster (1995)
- A.D. 2044 (Windows) (1996)
- Sfinx (1997)
- Wacuś the Detective (1997)
- Jazz Jackrabbit 2 (publisher only, 1998)
- Jazz Jackrabbit 2: The Secret Files (publisher only, 1998)
- Tridonis (2000)
- Schizm (developed by Detalion, 2001)
- Garden Composer 3D - design software
