= Feuerhalle Simmering =

Crematorium in Vienna, Austria

Coordinates: 48.1584°N 16.4414°E

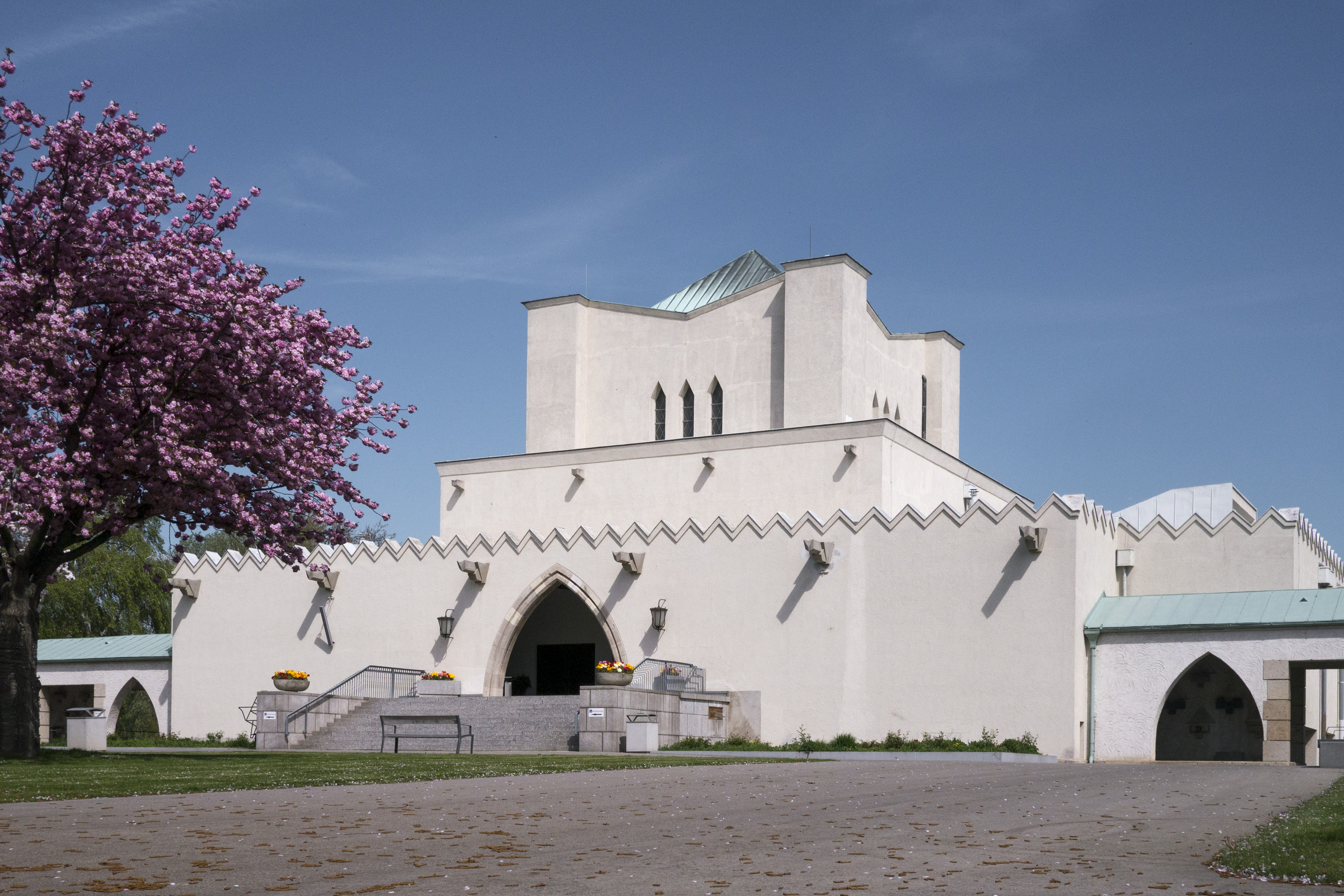
Feuerhalle Simmering

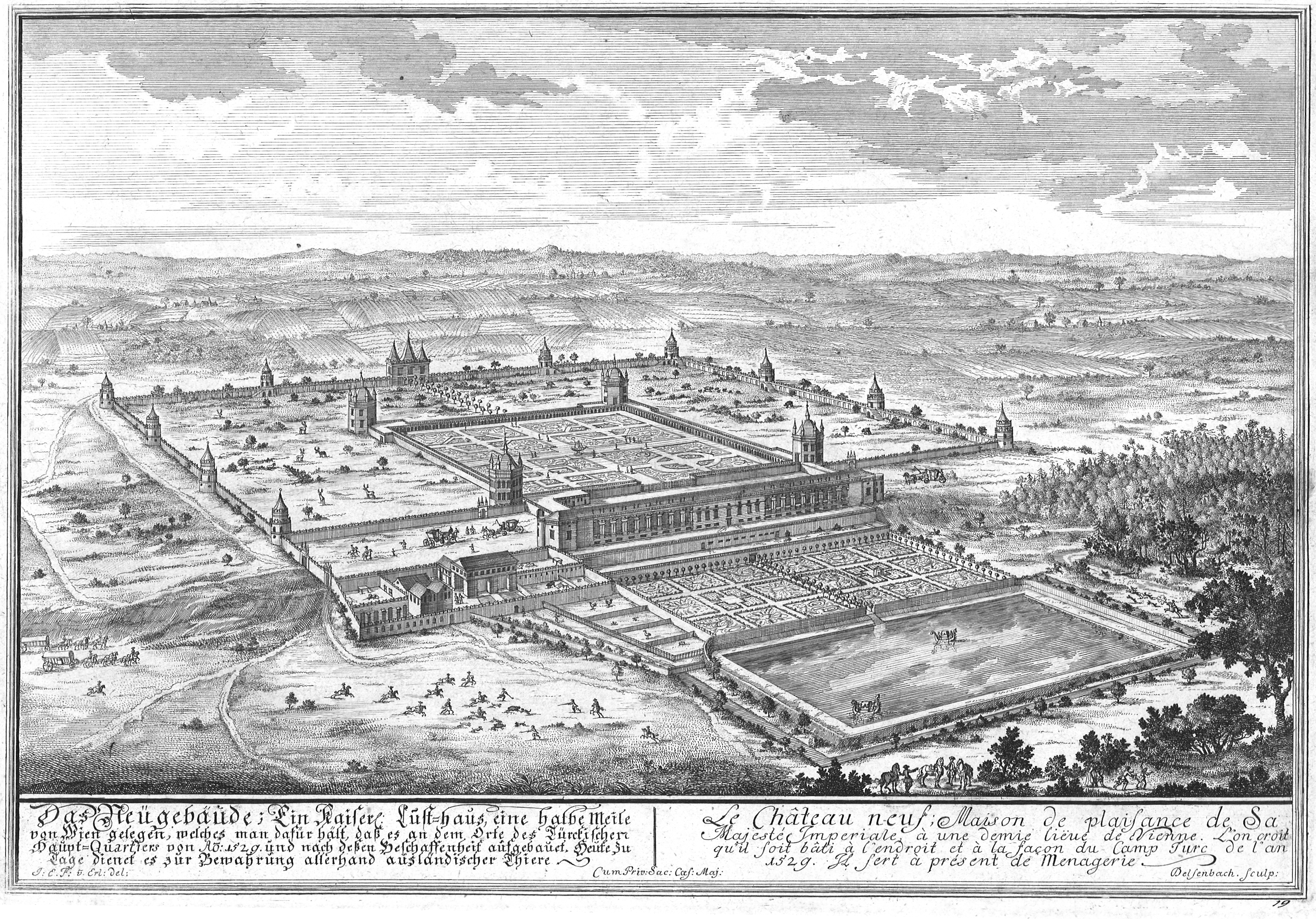
Schloss Neugebäude around 1720

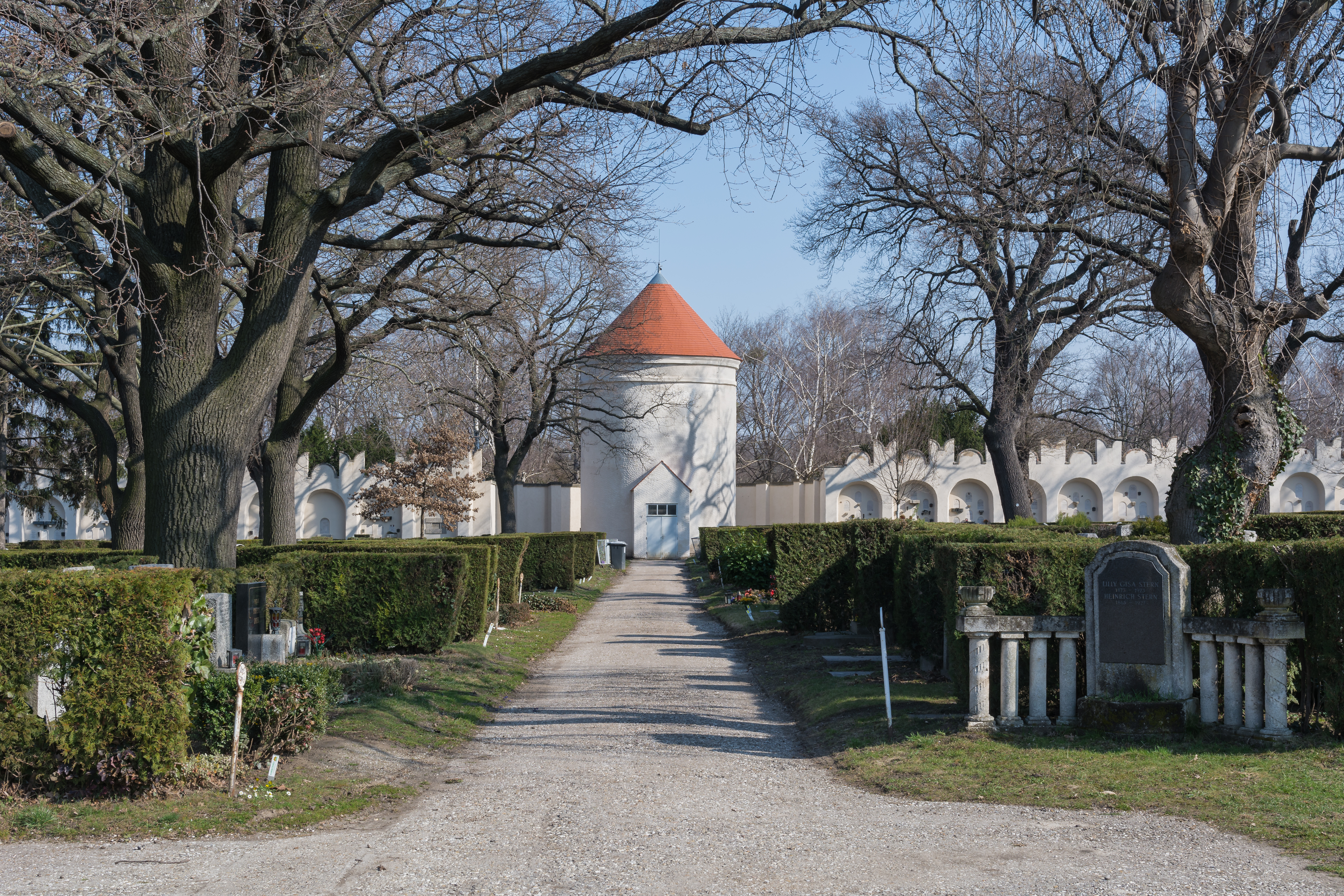
Urn burial ground with old Schloss Neugebäude tower

Feuerhalle Simmering is a crematorium with attached urn burial ground in the Simmering district of Vienna, Austria. It lies at the end of an alley, directly opposite Vienna Central Cemetery's main gate.

== Description ==
Opened on 17 December 1922 by Vienna's mayor Jakob Reumann, Feuerhalle Simmering was the first crematorium in Austria. It also constituted an element of the social and health services policy of Red Vienna. Advocates of cremation, especially from the labour movement – such as the Workers' Cremation Association "The Flame" –, had been campaigning for decades for crematoria in Austria, but applications were always rejected by the authorities. In 1921, Vienna's City Council, now under Social Democrat rule, approved the construction of a crematorium in Vienna. Reumann had to defend this decision at the Austrian Constitutional Court as he had granted building permission for the crematorium against the order of a federal minister from the Christian Social Party. The lawsuit was finally decided in 1924 in favour of the crematorium.

Feuerhalle Simmering's main building and its immediate surroundings were planned by Clemens Holzmeister, who designed the crematorium to resemble an oriental fortress. Holzmeister's design carefully placed the crematorium into the walled gardens of the derelict Schloss Neugebäude, and thus also put the former palace gardens with its many ancient trees (designated natural monuments) to new use as urn burial ground.

Robert Danneberg (1882–1942) and Käthe Leichter (1895–1942), two prominent Social Democrat politicians associated with Red Vienna, were killed in Nazi concentration camps and have symbolic graves of honour at Feuerhalle Simmering.

== Notable cremations ==
=== Ashes on site ===
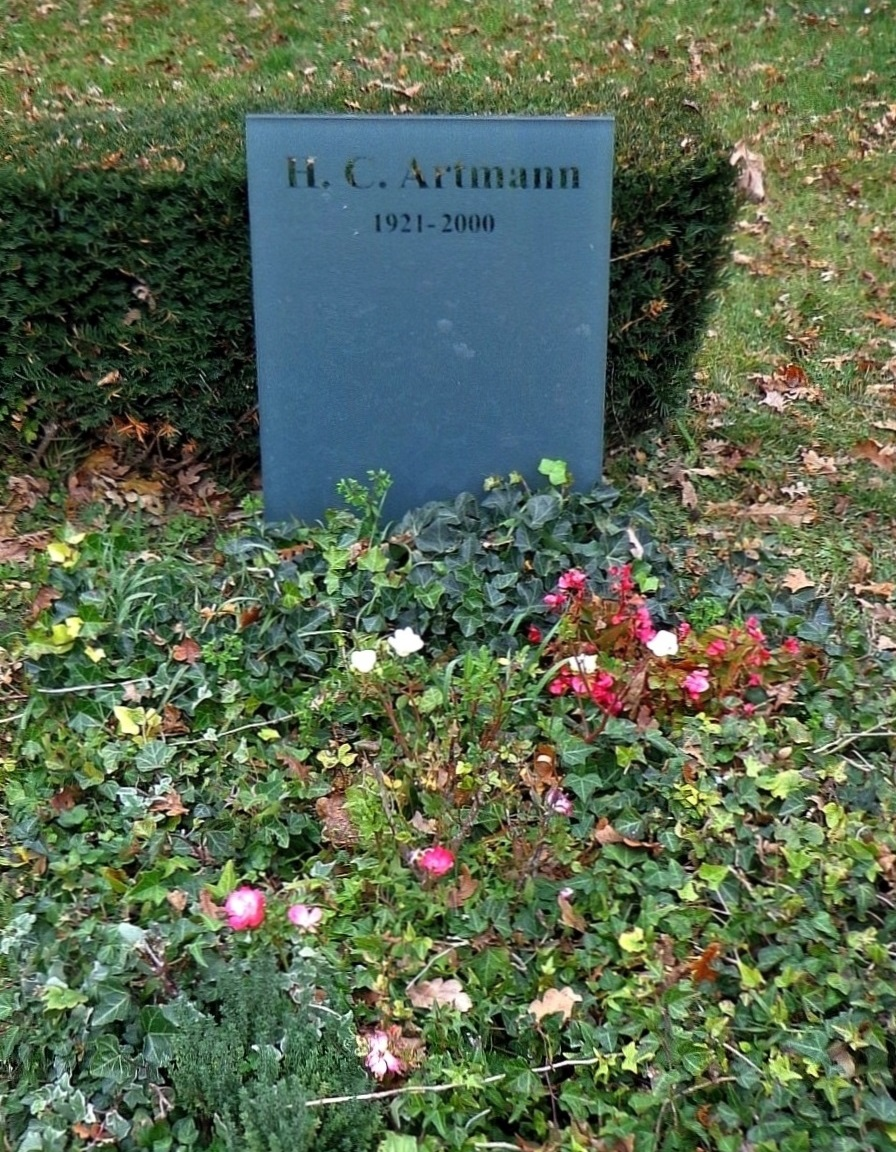
Grave of H.C. Artmann

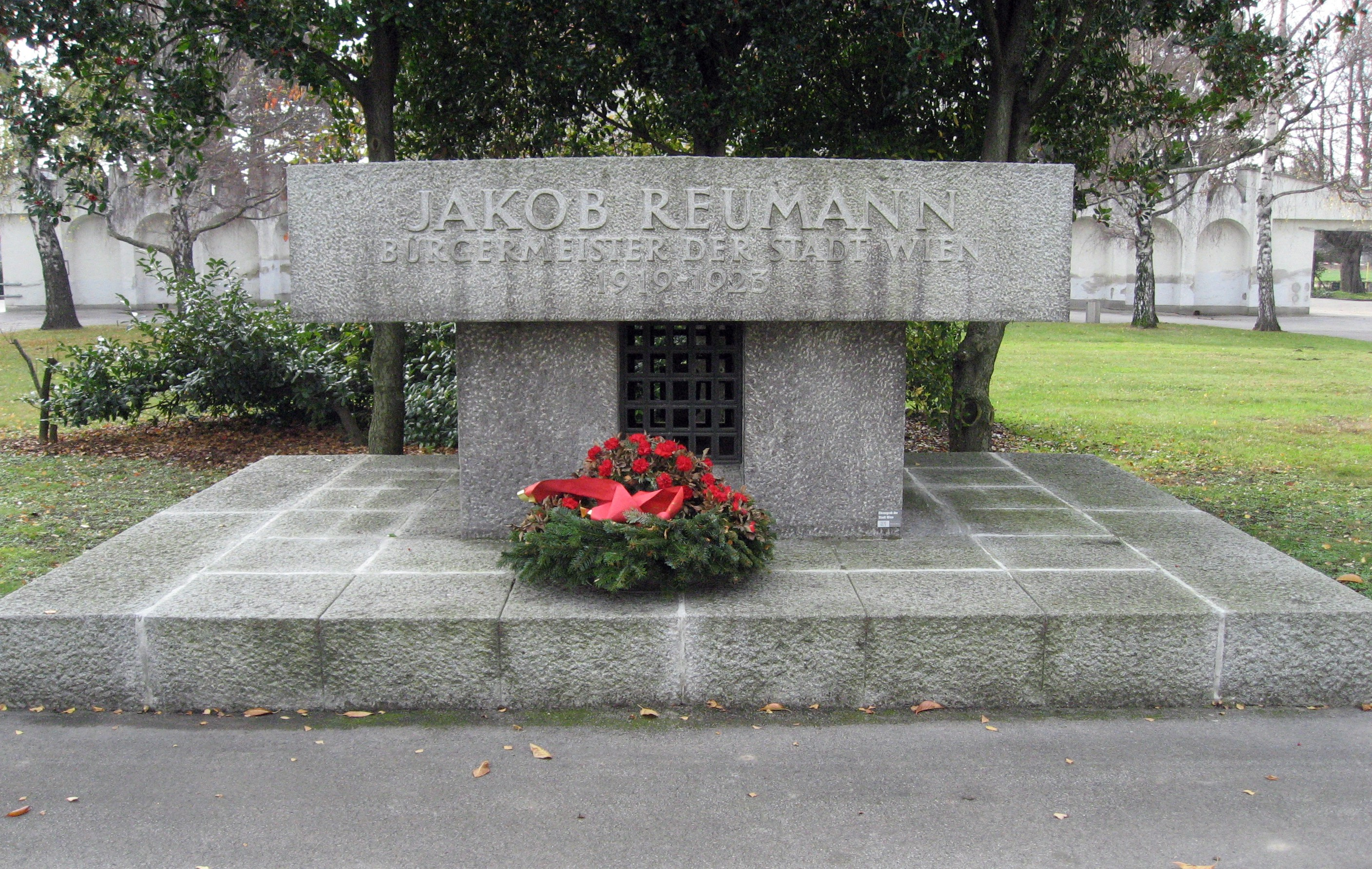
Grave of Jakob Reumann

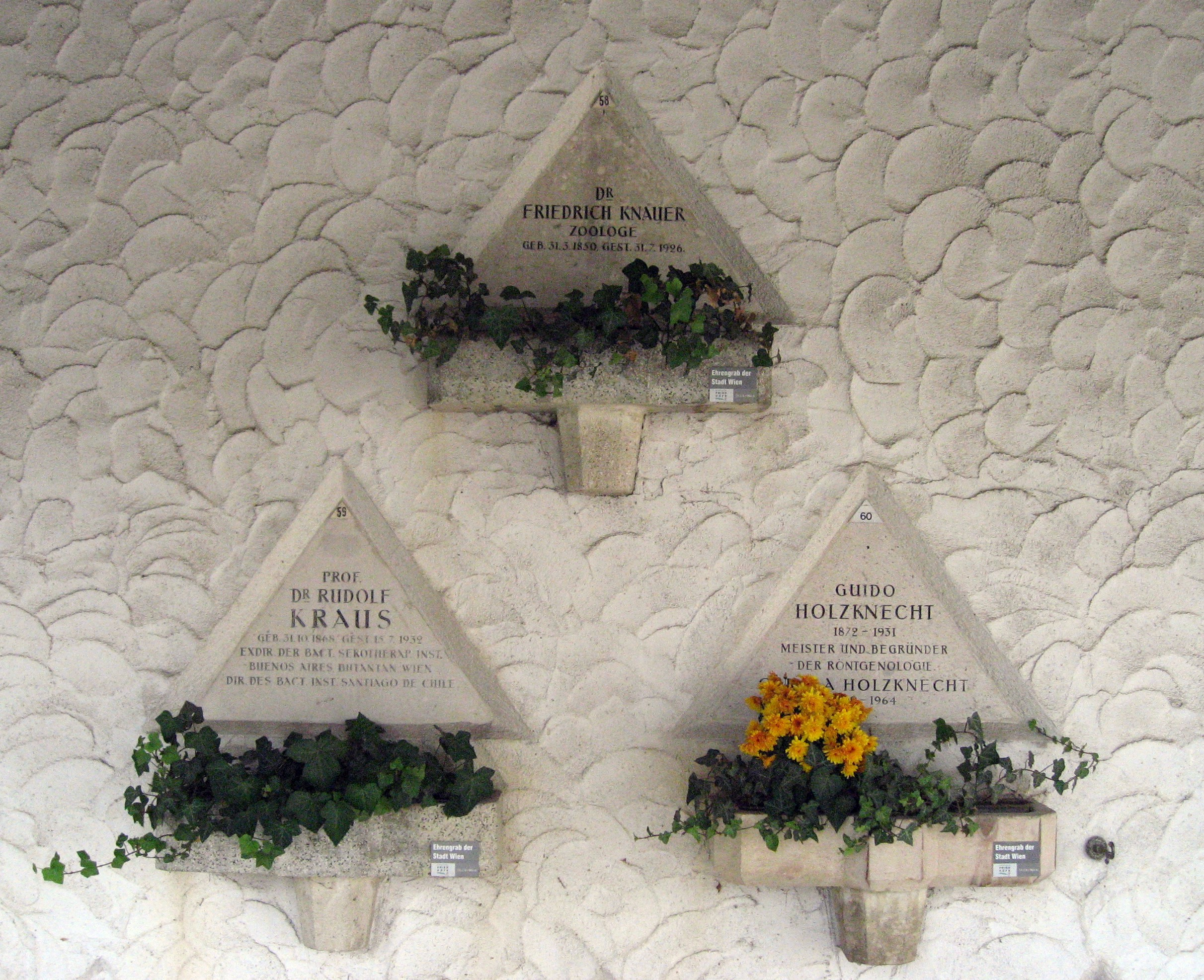
Graves of Guido Holzknecht, Rudolf Kraus and Friedrich Knauer

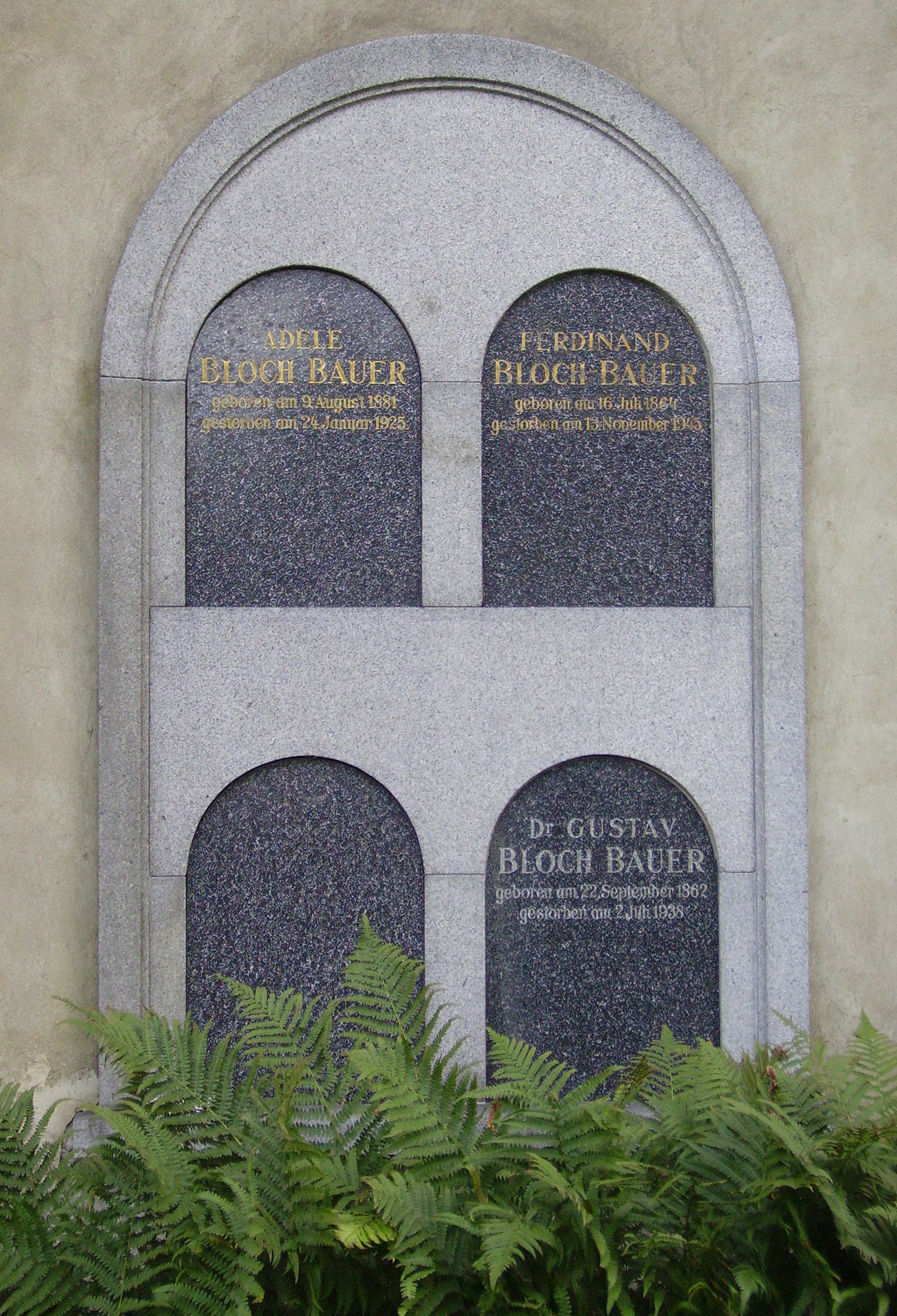
Grave of Ferdinand and Adele Bloch-Bauer

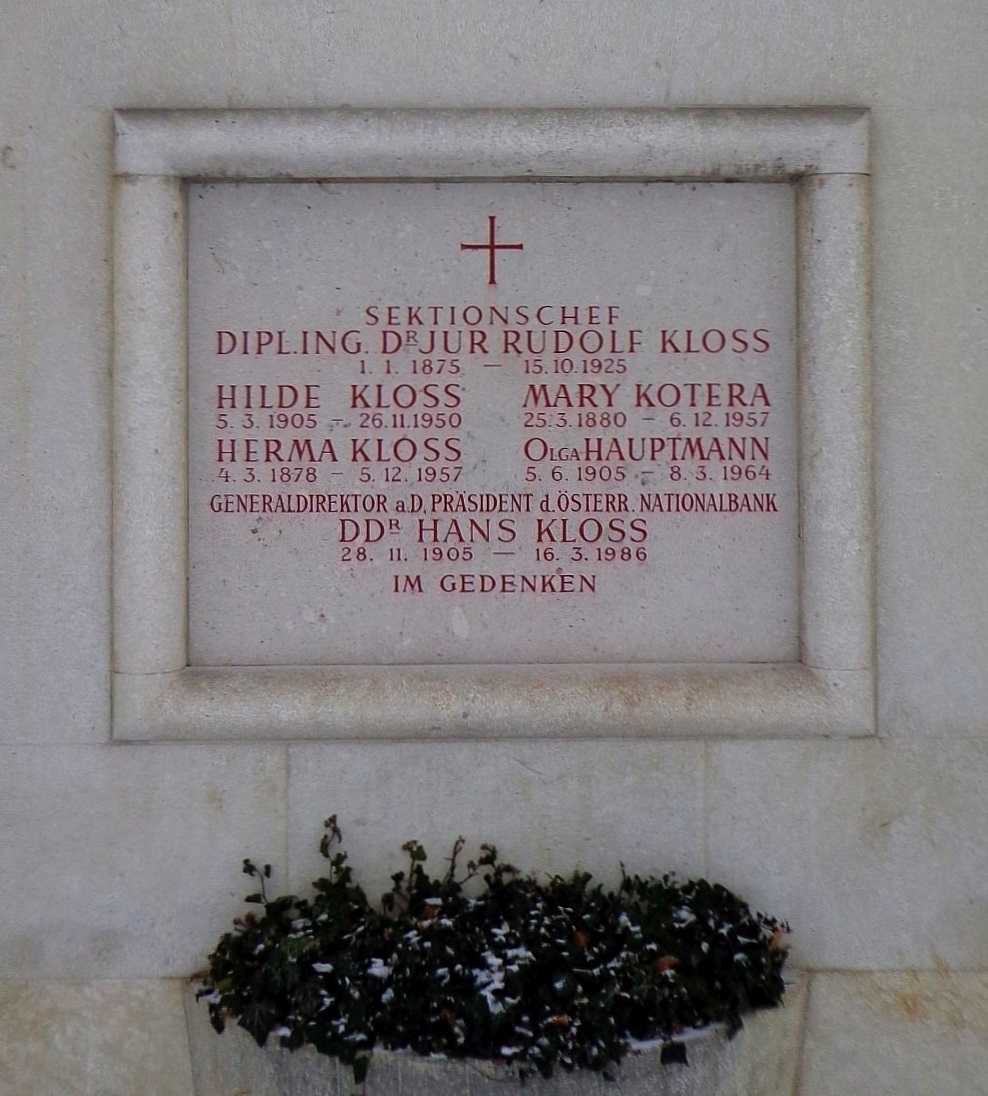
Grave of Hans Kloss

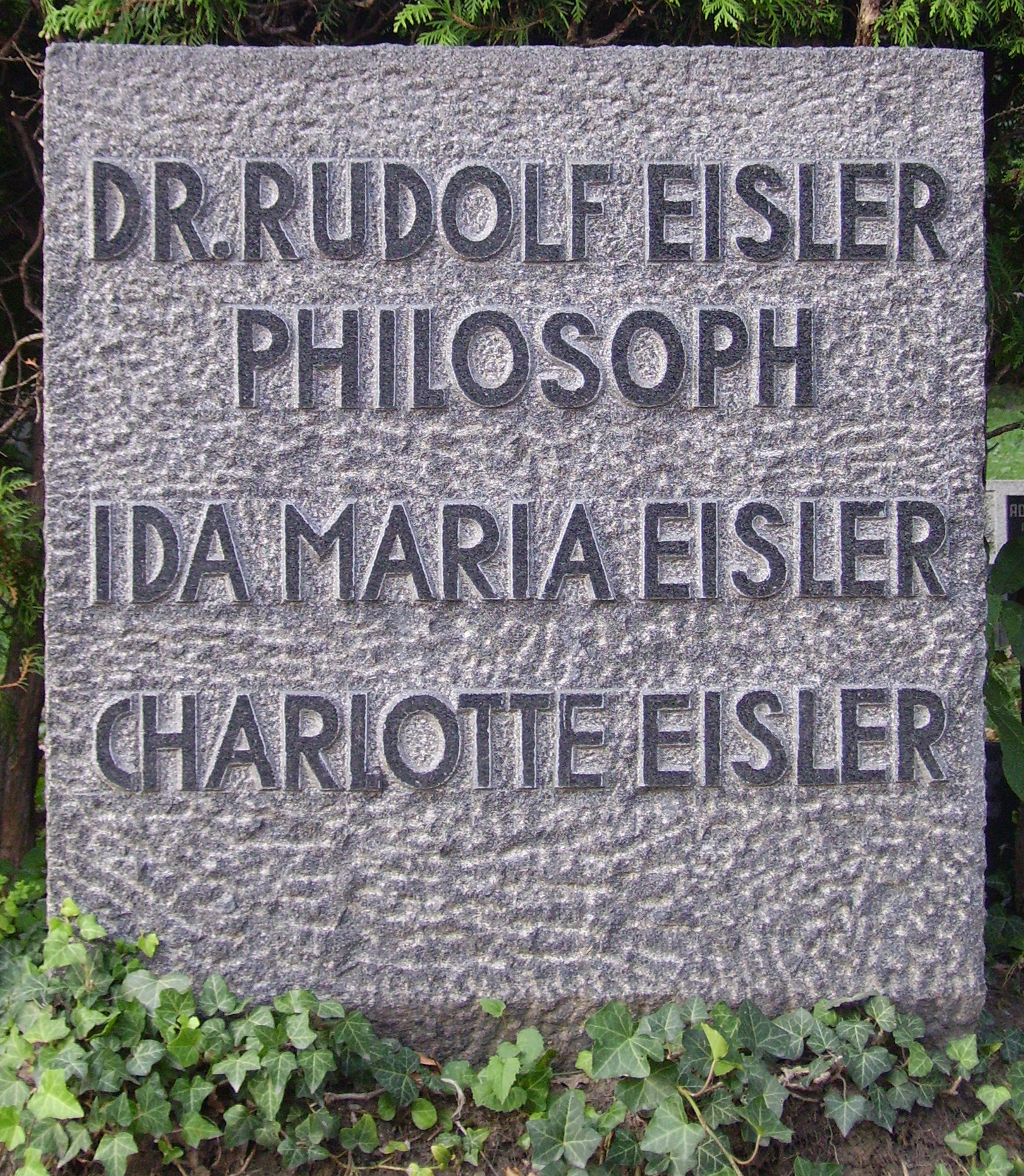
Grave of Rudolf Eisler

- Friedrich Achleitner (1930–2019), poet and architecture critic
- Manfred Ackermann (1898–1991), politician
- Hellmut Andics (1922–1998), journalist
- H.C. Artmann (1921–2000), writer
- Hugo Bettauer (1872–1925), writer
- Turhan Bey (1922–2012), actor
- William Blankenship (1928–2017), opera singer
- Elfriede Blauensteiner (1931–2003), serial killer
- Adele Bloch-Bauer (1881–1925), painted as Portrait of Adele Bloch-Bauer by Gustav Klimt
- Annie Dirkens (1869–1942), actress
- Rudolf Eisler (1873–1926), philosopher
- Roman Felleis (1903–1944), political activist
- Alfred Hermann Fried (1864–1921), publicist, awarded the Nobel Peace Prize in 1911
- Joseph Gregor (1888–1960), writer
- Ferdinand Hanusch (1866–1923), politician
- Irene Harand (1900–1975), human rights activist
- Guido Holzknecht (1872–1931), radiologist
- Hans Kloss (1905–1986), bank manager
- Friedrich Knauer (1850–1926), zoologist
- Johann Koplenig (1891–1968), politician
- Rudolf Kraus (1868–1932), pathologist
- Minna Lachs (1907–1993), educator
- Hans Maršálek (1914–2011), political activist
- Jacob Levy Moreno (1889–1974), psychiatrist
- Franz von Nopcsa (1877–1933), paleontologist
- Max Pallenberg (1877–1934), actor
- Alfred Piccaver (1884–1958), opera singer
- Rudolf Prikryl (1896–1965), mayor of Vienna
- Jakob Reumann (1853–1925), mayor of Vienna
- Hilde Rössel-Majdan (1921–2010), opera singer
- Alexander Roda Roda (1872–1945), writer
- Elisabeth Ruttkay (1926–2009), archaeologist
- Miklós Sárkány (1908–1998), Olympic gold medalist
- Vera Schwarz (1888–1964), opera singer
- Amalie Seidel (1876–1952), politician
- Carl Sternberg (1872–1935), pathologist
- Teresa Stich-Randall (1927–2007), opera singer
- Julius Tandler (1869–1936), physician and politician
- Oswald Thomas (1882–1963), astronomer
- Stefan Weber (1946–2018), musician
- Alfred Maria Willner (1859–1929), writer

=== Ashes elsewhere ===
- Lale Andersen (1905–1972), singer and actress – ashes buried at Langeoog, Germany
- Arik Brauer (1929–2021), painter and singer-songwriter – ashes buried in Vienna Central Cemetery
- Alfred Ebenbauer (1945–2007), medievalist – ashes buried in Stammersdorfer Zentralfriedhof, Vienna
- Nika Brettschneider (1951–2018), Charter 77 signatory – ashes given to family
- Erich Feigl (1931–2007), journalist and filmmaker – ashes buried in Simmeringer Friedhof, Vienna
- Marlen Haushofer (1920–1970), writer – ashes buried at Steyr City Cemetery
- Ernst Hinterberger (1931–2012), writer – ashes buried in Vienna Central Cemetery
- Franz Holzweber (1904–1934), July Putsch assassin – ashes buried in Friedhof Mauer, Vienna
- Ernst Kirchweger (1898–1965), victim of political violence – ashes now buried in Hietzing Cemetery, Vienna
- György Ligeti (1923–2006), composer – ashes buried in Vienna Central Cemetery
- Jörg Mauthe (1924–1986), writer – ashes kept at his family's Burgruine Mollenburg
- Freda Meissner-Blau (1927–2015), politician – ashes given to family
- Alexander Moissi (1879–1935), actor – ashes buried at Morcote, Switzerland
- Sabine Oberhauser (1963–2017), politician – ashes buried in Hietzing Cemetery, Vienna
- Otto Planetta (1899–1934), July Putsch assassin – ashes buried in Dornbacher Friedhof, Vienna
- Hugo Portisch (1927–2021), journalist – ashes buried in Vienna Central Cemetery
- Barbara Prammer (1954–2014), politician – ashes buried in Vienna Central Cemetery
- Werner Schneyder (1937–2019), cabaret performer – ashes buried in Vienna Central Cemetery
- Otto Tausig (1922–2011), actor – ashes buried in Vienna Central Cemetery
- Helene Thimig (1889–1974), actress – ashes now buried in Neustifter Friedhof, Vienna
- Lotte Tobisch (1926–2019), actress – ashes buried in Grinzinger Friedhof, Vienna
- Joe Zawinul (1932–2007), musician – ashes buried in Vienna Central Cemetery
