= Electro Man =

1992 video game

- Developer: X LanD Computer Games
- Publishers: POL: X LanD Computer Games; NA: Epic MegaGames
- Designers: Maciej Miąsik; Janusz Pelc
- Composer: Daniel Kleczyński
- Platform: MS-DOS
- Release: POL: February 21, 1992; NA: 1993
- Genre: Platform
- Mode: Single-player

Electro Man, originally distributed in Poland under the title Electro Body, is an MS-DOS platform game developed by the Polish company X LanD Computer Games. It was originally released in Poland by xLand in 1992, and later published by Epic MegaGames in the United States in 1993; apart from the changed title, the Electro Man release contains some changes, such as upgraded graphics. Though initially offered under a shareware license, the game was released as freeware by the developer on June 25, 2006, under the Creative Commons Attribution-ShareAlike 2.5 license. The player controls a cyborg named "Jacek", who must get through all the areas of a space base while destroying enemies.

Electro Body was successful in Poland. It is considered to be the first truly "professional" Polish computer game released on the PC platform and has been described as a "cult" game.

In 2014, a limited collector's edition of the game was released for its 22nd anniversary by IQ Publishing; this edition came with a soundtrack and a numbered certificate.

Electro Man was re-released on GOG.com on April 30th, 2026.

== Gameplay ==
The first room of the game, in the 1992 Electro Body version (top) and the 1993 Electro Man (bottom).

The plot of Electro Man takes place in the future. Jacek's family is killed by aliens in an attack on a human-populated space base. Eager for revenge, he returns to the conquered base as a cyborg equipped with advanced weaponry in order to reclaim the facility from the invaders.

On each of the levels, the player must find three electronic chips and use them to activate a large teleporter pad which serves as the exit. The base is full of dangers, such as security robots or automatic gun turrets. The protagonist dies instantly when shot, returning to the last touched checkpoint. There are also numerous small teleporters, which transport the protagonist between various areas in the level.

Jacek is armed with a gun which can be upgraded by collecting special batteries. A special meter on the right-hand side of the screen shows the current firepower of the gun. There is a limited number of shots of each power level available — once these run out, the firepower of the gun falls down by one level. At higher firepower levels the gun's rate of fire drops down, forcing the player to wait for the gun to cool down before firing again; the temperature of the gun is indicated by another meter on the left-hand side. Touching a checkpoint causes the gun's power level to drop down back to zero.

The original Electro Body release contains a copy protection measure, forcing the player to find the right letter in the manual in order to continue from one level to the next. This security measure was removed in the Electro Man version.

== Development ==
According to the memories of Maciej Miąsik, the game was created on the initiative of Marek Kubowicz, the founder of xLand, who made a proposal to Miąsik and Janusz Pelc to develop the first game for his company. The development took nine months. Together, Pelc and Miąsik designed and programmed the game, and created the graphics. The protagonist was given a face-covering helmet, as drawing a convincing face proved too difficult. The game's title was inspired by the electronic body music genre, which was also used by the composer, Daniel Kleczyński, as inspiration for the soundtrack.

Electro Body was released in professional packaging, comparable to games released by Western publishers. The box contained an instruction manual, reference card with controls and a cassette tape containing the game soundtrack, thus allowing even players without sound cards to enjoy the music. Creating the boxes at the time was not a simple task for the developers; the boxes were shrink-wrapped by hand, with the help of a kitchen heat sealer and a sandwich toaster. The back of the box was decorated with screenshots made with a photo camera. Advertising material created for the game included posters and radio advertisements.

Electro Body was noted for its low system requirements. The game supported every video card on the Polish market, including the Hercules Graphics Card, CGA, EGA and VGA cards; it also supported numerous audio devices, including the PC speaker, Covox Speech Thing or the Sound Blaster. A special release of the game came with a Covox device included in the box.

Hoping to get the game picked up by a Western distributor, the developers sent a copy of the game on floppy disk by mail to the American company Epic MegaGames. Epic expressed interest, and xLand representatives met in Rotterdam with Mark Rein; the negotiations were successful, and the game was released in the United States under the title Electro Man. This release was a modified version of the original; the changes included removal of copy protection measures, and removing support for all video modes other than VGA.

xLand planned to develop a sequel, under the title Electro Body 2. Planned features of this "military 2D platform game" included 3D rendered sprites, as well as a new game engine allowing for nine separate planes of scrolling and special effects. The game never saw the light of day.

== Reception ==
Reception

Review scores
Publication	Score
Top Secret	3/5
PC Player	46/100
PC Joker	28%

Electro Body met with critical acclaim in Poland. The reviewer in Top Secret praised its graphics and music. PC World Komputer praised the "packaging that no western company would be ashamed of" and described the graphics as "excellent". Jacek Maciejewski of PC Magazine Po Polsku considered Electro Body to be a game "of a quite high quality", but criticized the copy protection, which he found annoying. The reviewer of Świat Gier Komputerowych stated that the game "speaks well" of the Polish art of programming.

The game received more mixed reviews in Germany. PC Games praised its graphics and compared it favorably to games by Apogee Software. In contrast, the review in PC Player panned the game, criticizing its controls and lack of scrolling, and complaining about some actions requiring "millimeter-perfect" positioning of the player character. The review in PC Joker stated that the graphics and animation was "poor" and "downright laughable", and described the controls as awkward.

The game was reviewed in 1994 in the Dragon magazine by Sandy Petersen, as part of the Epic Puzzle Pack (a compilation which also included Robbo and Heartlight). Petersen gave the compilation 3 out of 5 stars.

Years after its release, Electro Body was retrospectively considered an important step in the history of Polish computer games. An article on the website GameZilla.pl described it as "the first serious twitch of Polish game developers". Bartłomiej Kluska, a journalist specializing in the history of Polish games, considered it the first serious Polish production for the PC platform and commended its graphics and "attention to detail".

In 2014 the Polish indie game website 1ndie World held a competition named "The Jam", with the objective of creating a game inspired by Electro Body. The winning game would receive a professional advertising campaign sponsored by the website Gry-Online, among other prizes. The competition winner was the game Ego Protocol.
