= Minna Lachs =

Minna Lachs (born as Minna Schiffmann; 1907–1993) was an Austrian educator and memoirist. She was born in Terebovlia, then known as Trembowla, in what was referred to as the Kingdom of Galicia and Lodomeria. The events of World War I prompted her family to leave for Vienna. Her father wished to distance himself from his Orthodox Judaism upbringing, while she initially felt a need to assert her Jewish identity more strongly. As part of that, she joined a Zionist youth organization, which ultimately led to an interest in Socialism and to meeting her husband. Lachs graduated from the University of Vienna with a thesis on Karl Emil Franzos. She fled Austria for Switzerland due to the Anschluss and her memoir concerning the period was titled Warum schaust du zurueck. She returned to Vienna after the war. Lachs was cremated at Feuerhalle Simmering, where her ashes are buried. A park in Vienna is named after her.

== See also ==
- List of Austrian writers
