= Irene Harand =

Austrian human rights activist (1900–1975)

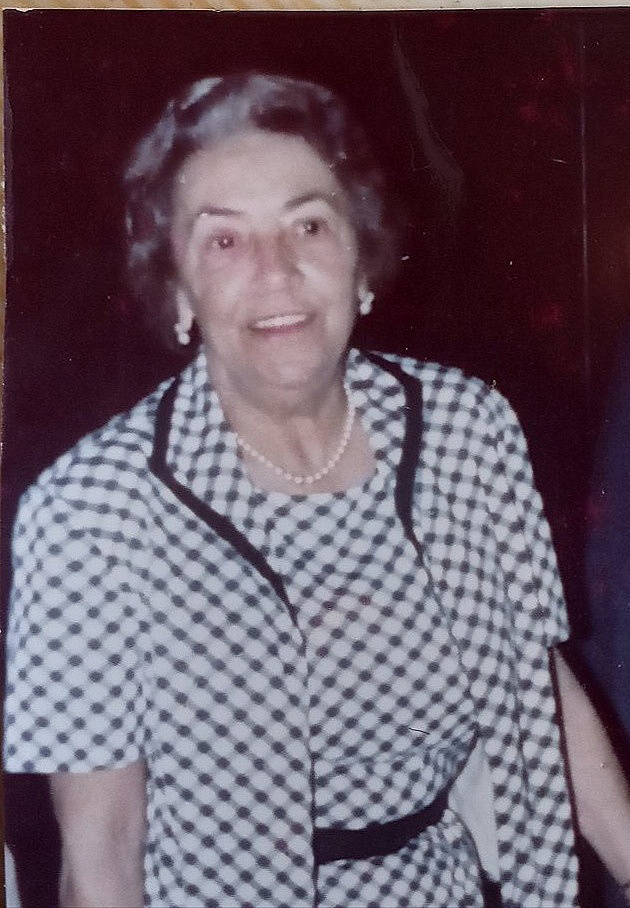
- Harand in 1969
- Born: 6 September 1900; Vienna, Austria-Hungary
- Died: 3 February 1975 (aged 74); New York City, New York, United States
- Burial place: Feuerhalle Simmering, Vienna, Austria
- Organization: Harand Movement; Austrian Cultural Forum
- Awards: Righteous Among the Nations

Irene Harand (6 September 1900 – 3 February 1975) was an Austrian human rights activist, writer and campaigner against antisemitism. She was recognised as Righteous Among the Nations.

== Biography ==
Harand was born a Roman Catholic in Vienna, Austria-Hungary, and was first exposed to antisemitism as a child by the experiences of her two half-cousins, who were Jewish.

Harand was an early organiser of protests against Nazi Germany's persecutions of Jews and actively campaigned throughout Europe before World War II. She started the Harand Movement, an organisation Weltbewegung gegen Rassenhass und Menschennot (World Movement Against Racial Hatred and Human Suffering) in 1933.

Though not opposed to the Austrofascist rule of Engelbert Dollfuß and his Fatherland's Front, Harand fought against antisemitic sentiments and Nazism. To counter Adolf Hitler's book Mein Kampf, she wrote a book named Sein Kampf - Antwort an Hitler von Irene Harand (His Struggle - the Answer to Hitler from Irene Harand) in 1935. It was translated into English and French.

In 1937, Irene Harand published a series of anti-Nazi poster stamps (oversized, unofficial stamps often used at the time in promotions) portraying the contributions made by Jews to civilisation over the centuries. One of the stamps featured L. L. Zamenhof, the creator of the international auxiliary language Esperanto.

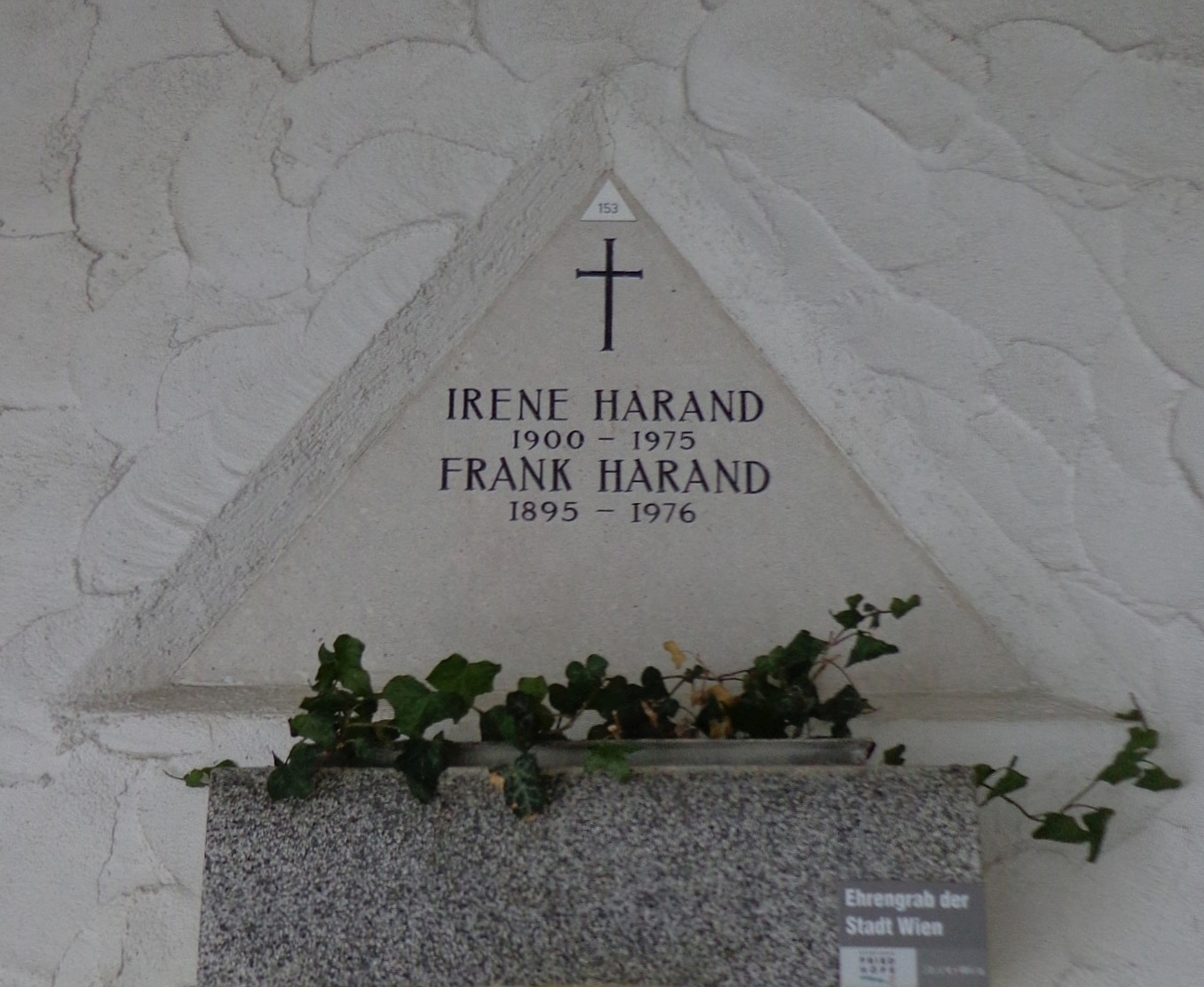
Feuerhalle Simmering, grave of Irene Harand

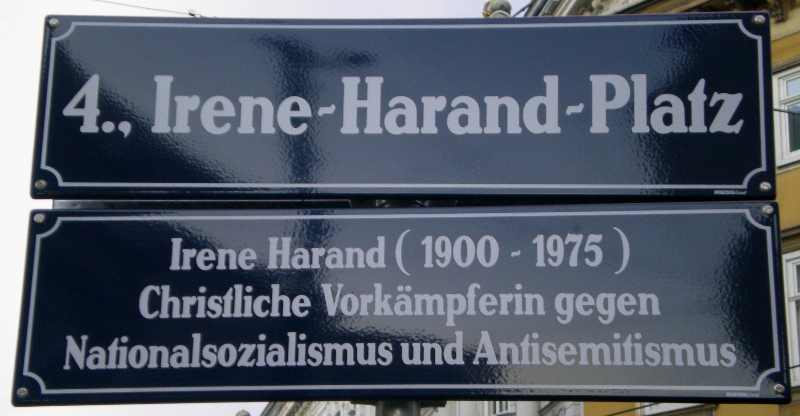
Street sign in Vienna-Wieden

When Nazi Germany invaded Austria in 1938, Harand was in London lecturing; it saved her life as the Nazis had set a price for her capture of 100,000 Reichsmark. She then emigrated to the United States, where she established the Austrian forum, which after the war was the basis for the Austrian Cultural Forum New York, of which she became the leader.

In 1967, Harand received the honorary title of a Righteous Among the Nations by Yad Vashem, the Holocaust remembrance centre in Israel, for her resistance against the Nazi antisemitism.

Harand died in New York City in 1975. Her ashes are buried at Feuerhalle Simmering in Vienna. In 2008 a square in the Vienna district of Wieden was named in her honour.

== See also ==
- Antisemitism
- Austrian Cultural Forum New York
