= Roman Felleis =

Austrian politician

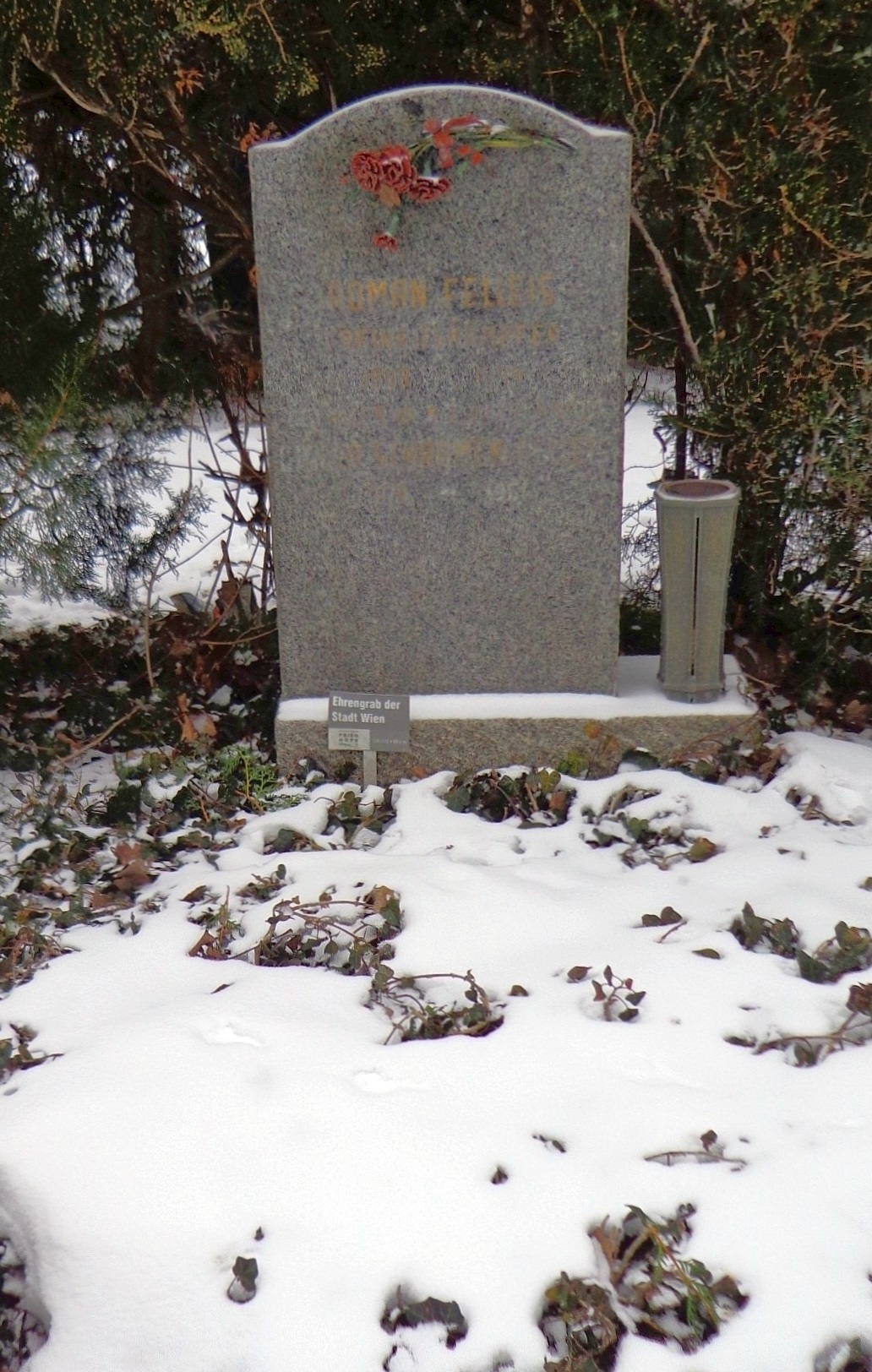
Feuerhalle Simmering, grave of Roman Felleis

Roman Felleis (18 March 1903 – 24 August 1944) was an Austrian political activist. He was a close friend of Bruno Kreisky, with whom he founded the "Revolutionäre Sozialistischen" ("Revolutionary Socialists") organisation in February 1934. After Austria's annexation by Nazi Germany in March 1938, both men knew it was only a matter of time before the Gestapo would come for them. Kreisky took an opportunity to flee to Sweden later that same year. Felleis refused to leave. He found work as a road builder which enabled him to change his home frequently and live illegally "underground" (unknown to the public authorities) so that he might, when he considered the time was right, create and develop cells of party activists. He died on 24 August 1944 as the result of an American bombing raid against Buchenwald concentration camp to where, by this time, he had been taken.

== Life ==
Roman Felleis was born early in the twentieth century to an unmarried sales assistant in Linz. After 1929 he became unemployed, but, in the words of his friend Bruno Kreisky, he "remained incessantly active" with "firm social democratic convictions".

His career as a political activist began in the Young Socialists ("Sozialistische Arbeiter-Jugend" / SAJ). After the brief but brutally suppressed insurrection of February 1934 the Young Socialists were banned: three months later a post-democratic government structure emerged in Austria. After the SAJ was declared illegal, on 18 February 1934 a meeting of its former officers took place in the woods west of Vienna. Under the leadership of Roman Felleis and Bruno Kreisky the participants founded the "Revolutionäre Sozialistischen" (RS / "Revolutionary Socialists") organisation. (Note: One source names the organisation set up by Falleis and his comrades on 18 February 1934 as the "Revolutionäre Sozialistische Jugend" ("Revolutionary Socialist Youth") but several other sources name it simply as the "Revolutionäre Sozialistischen", which appears more likely to be correct.)

Under the one-party "Ständestaat" structure implemented after February 1934 and incorporated into law in May 1934, the RSJ was by definition illegal. Felleis became a member of its five-man party executive. The Social Democratic Party having been declared illegal by the government in February 1934, a Party Congress was held across the border in Brünn (today Brno) in December 1934. Roman Felleis participated. Back in Austria he was arrested in January 1935 and held in investigative custody. In March 1936 he was one of the most prominent of the 28 defendants in the so-called Socialists' Trial ("Sozialistenprozess"), which at the time attracted considerable media interest internationally. Other high-profile defendants included Bruno Kreisky, Anton Proksch, Franz Jonas and Otto Probst. He received a sixteen-month jail sentence. He was released in June 1936, though it is not entirely clear whether this reflected some form of administrative clemency or simply resulted from the usual procedure which involved offsetting time detained awaiting trial against the appropriate part of the sentence subsequently conferred. On his release he returned to activism with the "Revolutionäre Sozialistischen".

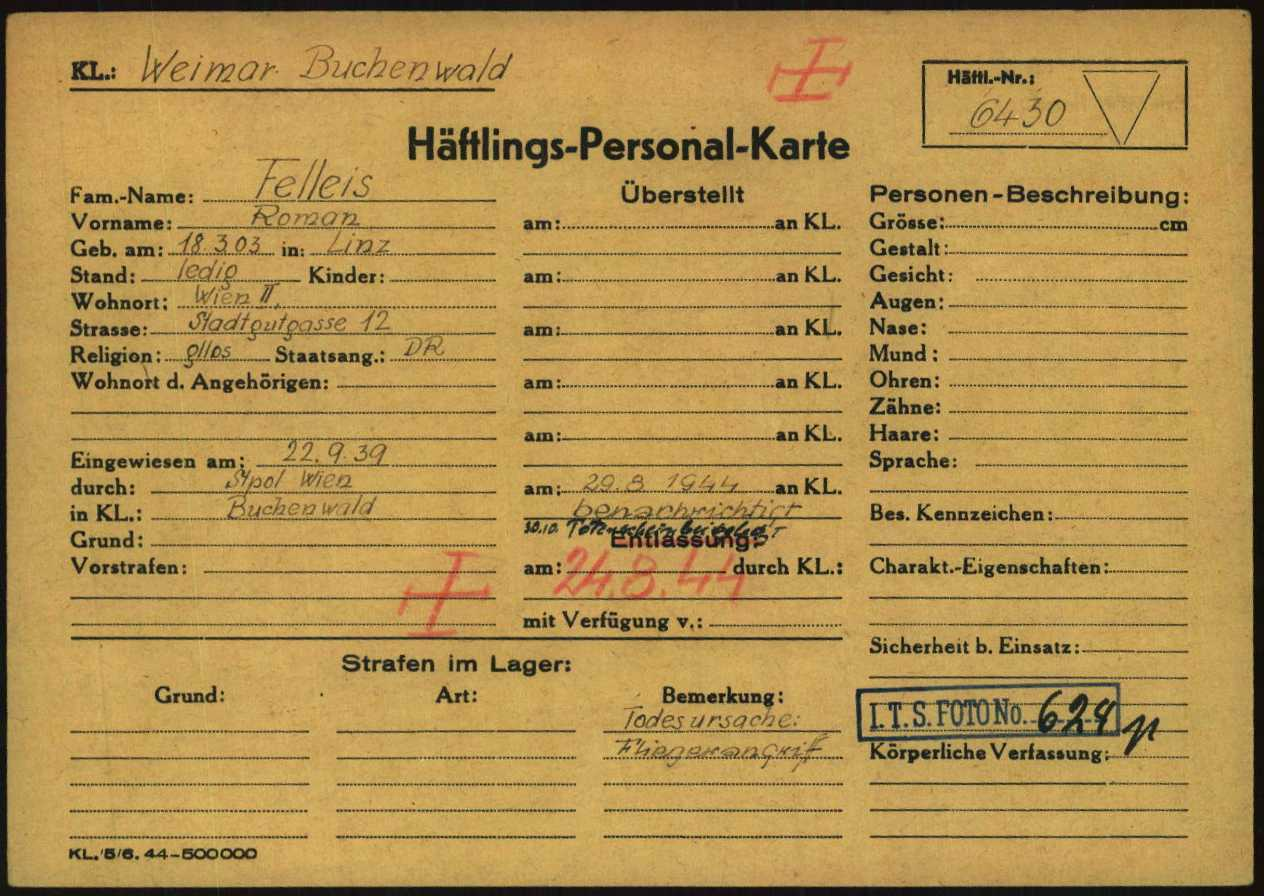
Registration card of Roman Felleis as a prisoner at Buchenwald Nazi Concentration Camp

In August 1939 the Gestapo in Vienna performed a round-up of 47 "revolutionary socialists". Few of them would face a court. Most, including Felleis, were simply taken into "protective custody" and delivered into the concentration camp network. It seems to have been almost immediately that he was transferred to the Buchenwald concentration camp near Weimar. Here he worked with the (illegal) prisoners' committee. Where possible, he took particular care of Austrian Jewish inmates such as Robert Danneberg, Heinrich Steinitz and Edmund Reismann who were treated even more brutally by the camp authorities than other prisoners.

Buchenwald concentration camp was targeted and badly degraded by American bombers on 24 August 1944. A number of the prisoners were killed. Roman Felleis was one of them. His ashes are buried at Feuerhalle Simmering in Vienna.
