= Hans Kloss (bank manager) =

- Born: November 28, 1905
- Died: March 16, 1985 (aged 79)

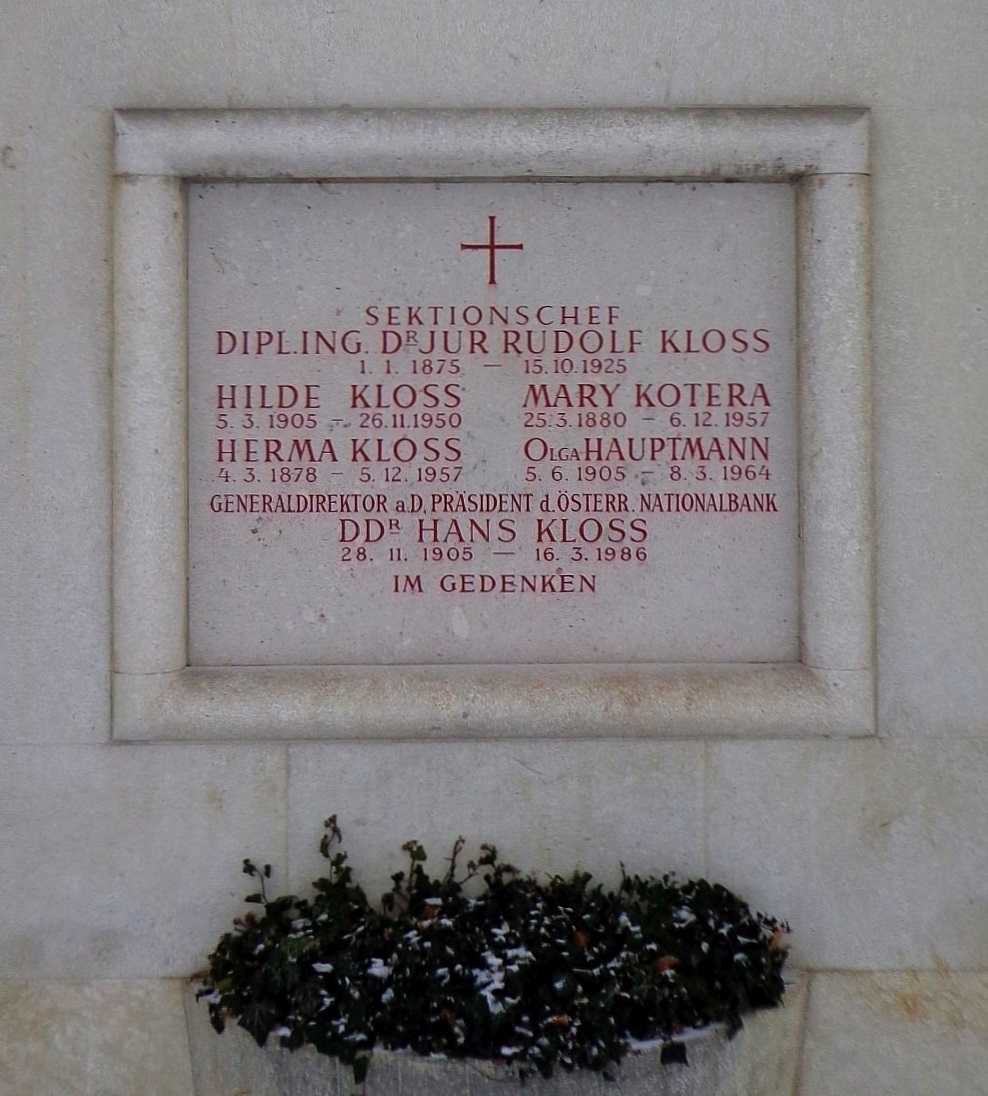
Kloss family grave, Feuerhalle Simmering, Vienna

Hans Kloss (28 November 1905 – 16 March 1986) was an Austrian lawyer and bank manager. Kloss was born in Vienna in 1905. After studying law and political science, he worked for Österreichische Luftverkehrs AG and between 1939 and 1945 for the Lufthansa. After the Second World War, he became a civil servant in the Ministry of Finance in 1946, and worked there in providing services to the Austrian finance industry and as a delegate to the International Monetary Fund. He also worked in the Finance Committee of the OECD and for the World Bank in Washington, D.C. In 1962 Kloss moved into the private banking sector as Director General of Genossenschaftlichen Zentralbank AG (today Raiffeisen Bank International). In 1969, he was appointed Director General of Austria's central bank Oesterreichische Nationalbank, and served as its president from 1973 to 1978. He was cremated at Feuerhalle Simmering, where also his ashes are buried.
