= Hans Kloss (video game) =

1992 video game

- Atari cover art
- Publisher: LK Avalon
- Programmer: Dariusz Żołna
- Artists: Dariusz Żołna; Sebastian Michna
- Composer: Daniel Kleczyński
- Platforms: Atari 8-bit, Commodore 64
- Release: Atari 8-bit: POL: 1992; Commodore 64: POL: 1993
- Genre: Puzzle-platform
- Mode: Single-player

Hans Kloss is a puzzle-platform game designed by Dariusz Żołna and published in Poland by LK Avalon. It was published in 1992 for Atari 8-bit computers. A Commodore 64 conversion, programmed by Janusz Dąbrowski, was released in 1993. The player controls Hans Kloss, the fictional protagonist of the Polish TV series Stawka większa niż życie, during World War II. He must find plans for a secret weapon in Adolf Hitler's headquarters, the Wolf's Lair.

Hans Kloss met with success upon its release, in part because of its usage of a popular character. It was praised by reviewers for the quality of its gameplay, graphics and music.

== Gameplay ==
A room near the beginning of the game. A Goliath mine can be seen near the bottom.

Hans Kloss belongs to a genre known in Poland as gra labiryntowa ("maze game"). This categorization referred to flip-screen games set in a maze, which combined elements of action (e.g. avoiding enemies) and logic (e.g. collecting and using keys).

The player's task is to find 21 pieces of the plans of a secret Nazi weapon (the V-1 flying bomb), hidden within safes found around the corridors of the Wolf's Lair bunker, as well as a seal located in one of the rooms. Finishing the game requires the player to skillfully find his way around the mazelike bunker. Numerous closed doors bar the player's path, but keys can be found to open them, though each key is one-use.

Two counters displayed at the bottom of the screen represent the level of the protagonist's hunger and thirst. The value of the counters gradually decrease with time, and if either of them reaches zero, the game is over. They can be refilled by finding mutton legs and cups of coffee. Another threat are the Goliath tracked mines which occasionally appear in the rooms; while the protagonist remains in close contact with a mine, both counters decrease rapidly. The bunker also contains automatic machine guns with nearby motion detectors. Crossing a sensor causes the gun to fire, killing the protagonist instantly; however, a sensor can be temporarily deactivated by finding its off switch.

== Development ==
Hans Kloss was programmed by Dariusz Żołna, who had already developed a number of simple games published in the Tajemnice Atari magazine, but had ambitions to create "something bigger and more interesting". He decided to base the game on his favorite TV series, Stawka większa niż życie. The development took half a year; Żołna, then a school student preparing for his high-school exit exam, worked on it after school, sometimes by night. Three other developers worked on the game: Sebastian Michna (artist, who created the protagonist's animation and the title screen), Daniel Kleczyński (music composer) and Bartek Gałązka (level designer). Dariusz Żołna created some of the art assets: the background graphics, the Goliath mine sprites, the font and the plans of the V-1 flying bomb, which were copied by hand from a book illustration.

After the release of Hans Kloss, Żołna kept developing computer games (The Jet Action, Digi Duck). While Hans Kloss never received a proper sequel, in part due to concerns over using the copyrighted character, in 1993 Żołna released a similar game named Spy Master, a spiritual sequel where the player controlled Kloss's grandson. Nevertheless, Hans Kloss remains his most successful production.

== Reception ==
Hans Kloss met with critical acclaim in Polish video game press. The reviewer in Tajemnice Atari described it as "highly interesting and addictive" and praised the variety of the gameplay, as well as high-quality graphics and music; she also commented positively on the light-hearted aspects of the game, such as Kloss vomiting after eating too much food. The reviewer's only criticism was the unoriginal maze game concept. The game received an overall score of 4/5 from Top Secret, with music rated 2/5 and graphics rated 4/5. A review in the British New Atari User magazine praised the graphics, music and controls, and concluded that Hans Kloss was "one of the best arcade adventures" available for the Atari platform.

In the Secret Service magazine, the Commodore 64 port was commended for graphics and music, but was criticized for the slow jumping animation and lack of music outside of the title screen.
