= Julius Tandler =

Austrian physician and politician (1869–1936)

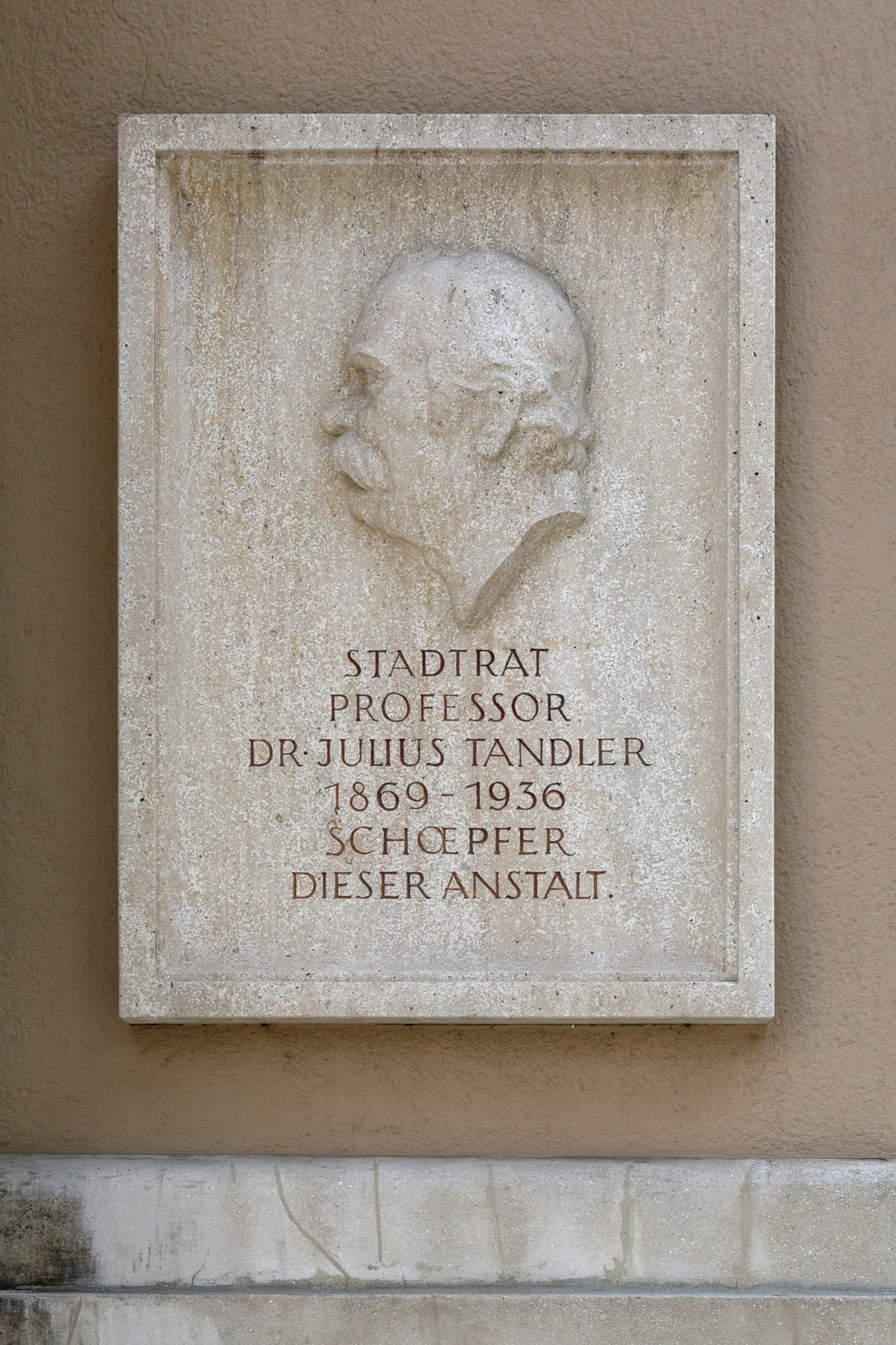
Commemorative plaque, Julius Tandler Family Centre, Vienna-Alsergrund

Julius Tandler (February 16, 1869 – August 25, 1936) was an Austrian physician and Social Democratic politician, whose research secured him a lasting place in the history of anatomy. His main claim to fame was his ambition to introduce a comprehensive system of public health and social services in the Vienna municipality in the interwar years.

== Life ==
Born in Jihlava, Moravia, Tandler attended the Gymnasium Wasagasse in the Vienna Alsergrund district. From 1910 he served as Professor of Anatomy at the University of Vienna; during World War I from 1914 to 1917 he was Dean of the Medical Faculty. After the war, he worked at the Office for Public Health and from 1920 as Health Care Councillor of the City of Vienna, fighting against widespread tuberculosis. Tandler became an elected member of the Academy of Sciences Leopoldina in 1925. In the early 1930s, he also was a consultant for the League of Nations.

Increasingly the target of antisemitic invectives, Tandler after the Austrian Civil War (Februarkämpfe) of 1934 and the rise of Austrofascism was forced to quit his job. He emigrated to China and in 1936 followed a call to Moscow to be an advisor in the Soviet hospital reform, but died there the same year. His ashes were returned to Vienna and buried at Feuerhalle Simmering in 1950.

== Reception ==
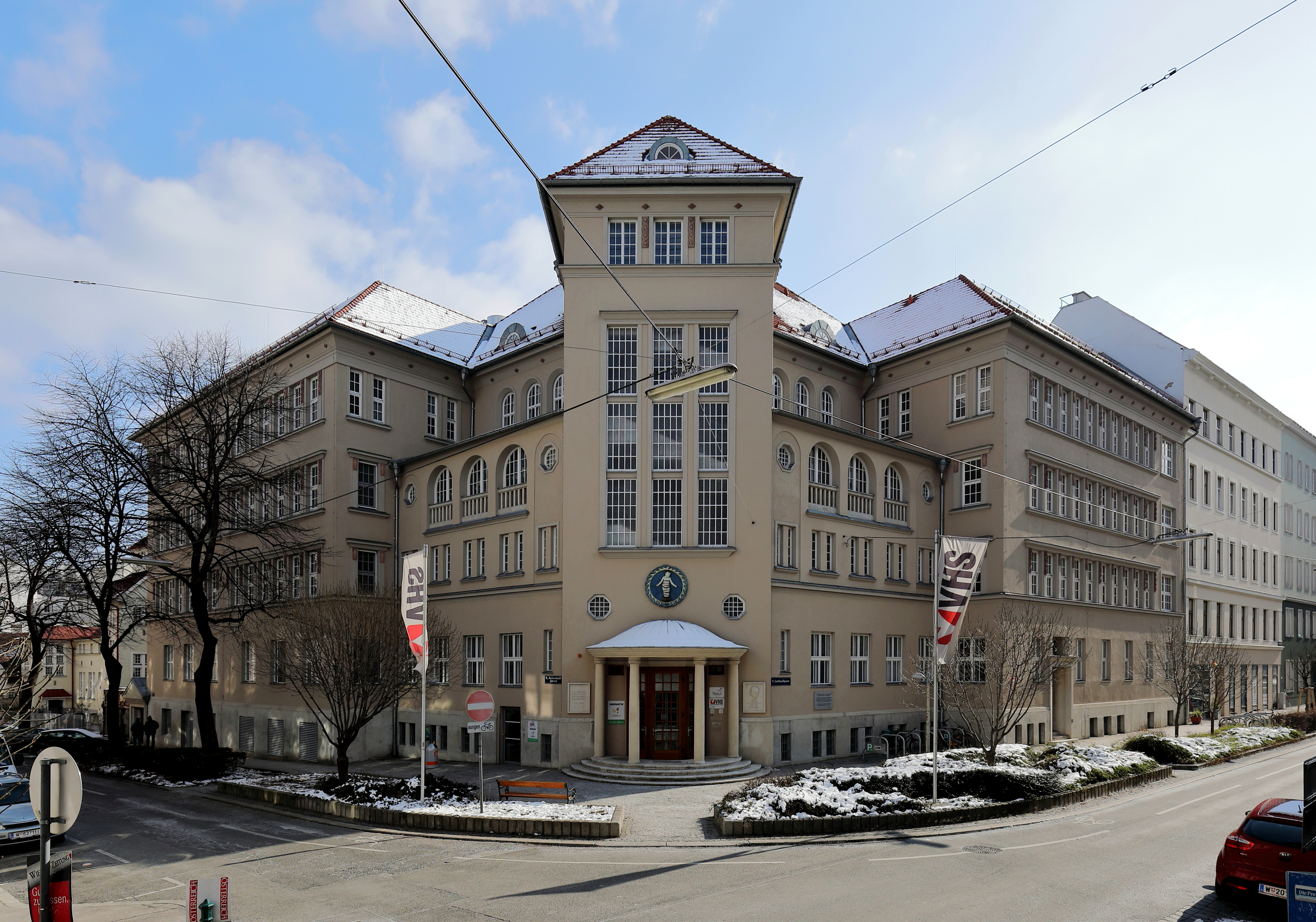
Julius Tandler Family Centre

Tandler was a leading anatomist of the Vienna University; he is also considered one of the architects of Red Vienna and the Austrian welfare state. He promoted family planning and marital therapy, while on the other hand, he vehemently advocated eugenics policies and proposed the sterilisation or extermination of "unworthy life" (unwertes Leben).

The square in front of Vienna Franz Josef Station in Vienna-Alsergrund is named "Julius-Tandler-Platz", and a student residence in the Döbling district is named "Julius-Tandler-Heim".

== Selected works ==
- Anatomie des Herzens, 1913 - Anatomy of the heart.
- Die biologischen Grundlagen der sekundären Geschlechtscharaktere, 1913 - The biological basis of secondary sexual characteristics.
- Topographie dringlicher Operationen, 1916.
- Lehrbuch der systematischen Anatomie, four volumes 1918-24 - Textbook of systematic anatomy.
- Das Wohlfahrtsamt der Stadt Wien, 1931 - Welfare of the city of Vienna.

== Sources ==
- Felix Czeike: Historisches Lexikon Wien, vol.5 (Kremayr & Scheriau: Vienna, 1997), p. 415.
- "Julius Tandler", in: Gerhard Heindl (ed.), Wissenschaft und Forschung in Österreich: Exemplarische Leistungen österreichischer Naturforscher, Techniker und Mediziner (Frankfurt am Main, 2000) 89-104.
- "Zur Umsetzung und Verbreitung von eugenischem/rassenhygienischem Gedankengut in Österreich bis 1934 unter besonderer Berücksichtigung Wiens", in: Sonia Horn (ed.), Medizin im Nationalsozialismus—Wege der Aufarbeitung (Vienna, 2001) 99-127.
