= A.D. 2044 =

1996 video game

- Developer: LK Avalon
- Publisher: LK Avalon
- Release: September 9, 1996
- Genre: Adventure

A.D. 2044 is a Polish adventure game by LK Avalon, released September 9, 1996 on Windows.

== Production ==
The game is a remake of a 1991 game of the same name developed by R.M.P. Software and published by LK Avalon, released to Atari 8-bit computers. It was a simple point and click adventure game created by Roland Pantoła. The new game is based on the same narrative, but with updated graphics.

It was the first Polish computer game released on two CDs and to have rendered three-dimensional graphics. The game was accompanied by a promotion in mass media that was unprecedented in scale for the country. While the game was originally released in Polish, English subtitles were finally added to the game in 2017.

== Plot and gameplay ==
Based on the film Seksmisja by Juliusz Machulski, the game is set in a future post-apocalyptic world where women rule the planet. This is caused by a radical women's group who capture some nuclear weapons and demand equal power from men, who respond by sending missiles which causes a nuclear winter. A thousand women survive by being in an underground bunker. In 2044, they discover a single male who was preserved in a hibernation capsule. The player is this male who escapes capture and begins to explore the environment.

The game plays like a point and click adventure. Players collect and manipulate items and click on hotspots. A male voice narrates the story and also provides hints.

== Critical reception ==
Gra.pl felt the 1991 version should be treated as a mere "interesting curiosity" in comparison to the more "interesting and better developed" one from 1996.

Metzomagic noted the game window was more generous that in other games, reaching around two-thirds of the screen. Imperium Gier felt that while the game was once considered very good, by the standards of 2012 it is simply average. However, the reviewer also noted that the game was a milestone in the Polish video game industry. Gry Online thought the game's visual design was its draw card.
