= Robbo (video game) =

1989 video game

- Atari 8-bit cover art
- Developer: X LanD Computer Games
- Publishers: LK Avalon; Epic MegaGames (MS-DOS)
- Designer: Janusz Pelc
- Platforms: Atari 8-bit, Atari ST, Commodore 64, MS-DOS, iOS
- Release: POL: 1989; NA: 1993
- Genre: Puzzle
- Mode: Single-player

Robbo is a puzzle video game designed by Janusz Pelc and published by LK Avalon in 1989 for Atari 8-bit computers. A success on the Polish domestic market, it was later ported to other computer platforms and released in the United States as The Adventures of Robbo.

== Gameplay ==
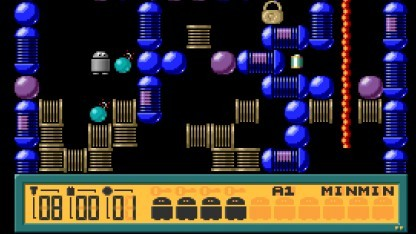
Gameplay screenshot

The game's design was partly inspired by Boulder Dash, but with the gravity aspect removed. The player controls the titular little robot through a series of planets (56 in the original Atari version), each being a vertically-scrolling maze filled with various objects and obstacles. The goal of each level is to collect all bolts scattered around, and then reach a capsule that takes the hero to the next planet. On his way Robbo must avoid deadly obstacles that include moving creatures, laser turrets, and large magnets. Various items can be found, including keys that open doors, bullets that kill enemies and destroy impassable walls of rubble, crates that can be pushed, bombs that explode upon being shot, and mirrors that teleport the hero around the level.

== Development and release ==
Robbo was designed and programmed by Polish programmer Janusz Pelc in 1989 for the Atari 8-bit computers, and was the first product of the company Laboratorium Komputerowe Avalon, which he established together with his school mate Tomasz Pazdan that same year in Rzeszów; both were 19 years old and had just passed the matura. A demo version was also published, as an advertisement for both the game and the company, that contained 4 unique levels, and listed addresses of Avalon's software distributors that were selling Robbo.

The initial release or Robbo announced a contest in the on-screen manual. The first five players who mailed a description of the game's ending sequence to Avalon would be rewarded with the company's next game. By 1991, Avalon received a few thousand solutions.

Pelc created a construction kit called Robbo Konstruktor, published by Avalon in December 1990 in a bundle with another game Lasermania. The utility allowed to edit level layouts and save them as standalone games. This led to a large number of different Robbo games being created on the Atari by enthusiasts, with new versions still surfacing as of April 2016.

== Ports ==
Pelc left Avalon in 1990 and was hired by a Kraków-based company Doctor Q, which also employed his friend Maciej Miąsik. Under the wings of Doctor Q both developers began porting Robbo to the IBM PC compatible platform, producing a demo version with 6 levels in 1991. That same year Marek Kubowicz, one of the chairmans of Doctor Q, left to establish a new company XLand with the intent to publish video games, and invited Pelc and Miąsik to join him. In the new company the developers finished Robbo for MS-DOS, which was consequently published by XLand in Poland in 1993. This version had enhanced 256-color VGA graphics and digitized sound, included a password system for maintaining game progress, and added four new levels to a total of 60.

Through a deal with Epic MegaGames, the XLand version was also distributed in 1993 in the United States by mail-order, under the title The Adventures of Robbo. Customers could also order Epic Puzzle Pack, a compilation of three XLand games including The Adventures of Robbo, Heartlight and Electro Man. The Adventures of Robbo would be later distributed in a box under the "Monkey Business" label by The B&N Companies, Inc. in 1994.

In 1993, LK Avalon published a Commodore 64 port of the game, developed by high-school student Sebastian Nowak. This version contains 76 new levels, and some additional types of objects not found in the original.

An Atari ST port followed in 1994, developed by Rafał Janicki, Paweł G. Angerman and Michał Juszczak and published in Poland by Larix. This version has 136 levels, including the ones from the Atari 8-bit version. The game sold in only ca. 80 copies.

== Reception ==
The Epic Puzzle Pack was reviewed in 1994 in Dragon #206 by Sandy Petersen in the "Eye of the Monitor" column. Petersen gave the compilation 3 out of 5 stars.

== Legacy ==
On 30 June 2000 Avalon published an enhanced remake for Windows titled Robbo Millennium. This game contained all the original Atari levels plus more, totalling at 130, along with updated graphics and sound, and a prerendered 3D intro. As of 2014 the game is available for purchase both as a boxed CD and as digital download.

On 25 June 2006, after obtaining approval from the rights holders, Maciej Miąsik released the three games from Epic Puzzle Pack, including The Adventures of Robbo, through the Classic DOS Games website as freeware under the Creative Commons BY-SA 2.5 license.

In 2010 the original Robbo game was ported to iOS by U-Play Interactive in close cooperation with Janusz Pelc, and published under the title iRobbo.

On 30 April 2026, Robbo, The Adventures of Robbo and Robbo Millenium were re-released on GOG.com, with the first two being freeware.
