= Laws protecting monuments by country =

Throughout the world, different laws exist that protect monuments.

== International law ==
Under international criminal law, monuments are considered a type of cultural heritage and their systematic destruction is prohibited by various international agreements.

== By country ==
=== Austria ===
Austrian laws protecting and preserving monuments have existed since 1853. The current law dates from 1923, and also protects the historic centers of Salzburg, Graz, and Vienna. The Federal Monuments Office oversees monuments protection.

=== Bosnia and Herzegovina ===
The Commission to Preserve National Monuments oversees monuments in Bosnia and Herzegovina.

=== France ===
The number of protected monuments in France has increased, so has the budget for maintaining them.

=== Germany ===
German law protects monuments from being destroyed during redevelopment.

=== Hungary ===
Like other countries, Hungary has laws to regulate and protect historical monuments.

=== Thailand ===
The main legislation covering the protection of historical monuments in Thailand is the Act on Ancient Monuments, Antiques, Objects of Art and National Museums, B.E. 2504 (1961).

=== United Kingdom ===
In the UK, a bill against desecration of war memorials is being considered.

=== United States ===
The National Historic Preservation Act of 1966 protects historic sites in the United States, including monuments.

A Pennsylvania law states that a person commits a misdemeanor of the second degree if he: (1) intentionally desecrates any public monument or structure, or place of worship or burial; or (2) intentionally desecrates any other object of veneration by the public or a substantial segment thereof in any public place; Desecrate means defacing, damaging, polluting or otherwise physically mistreating in a way that the actor knows will outrage the sensibilities of persons likely to observe or discover the action.
