= Guido Holzknecht =

Austrian radiologist (1872–1931)

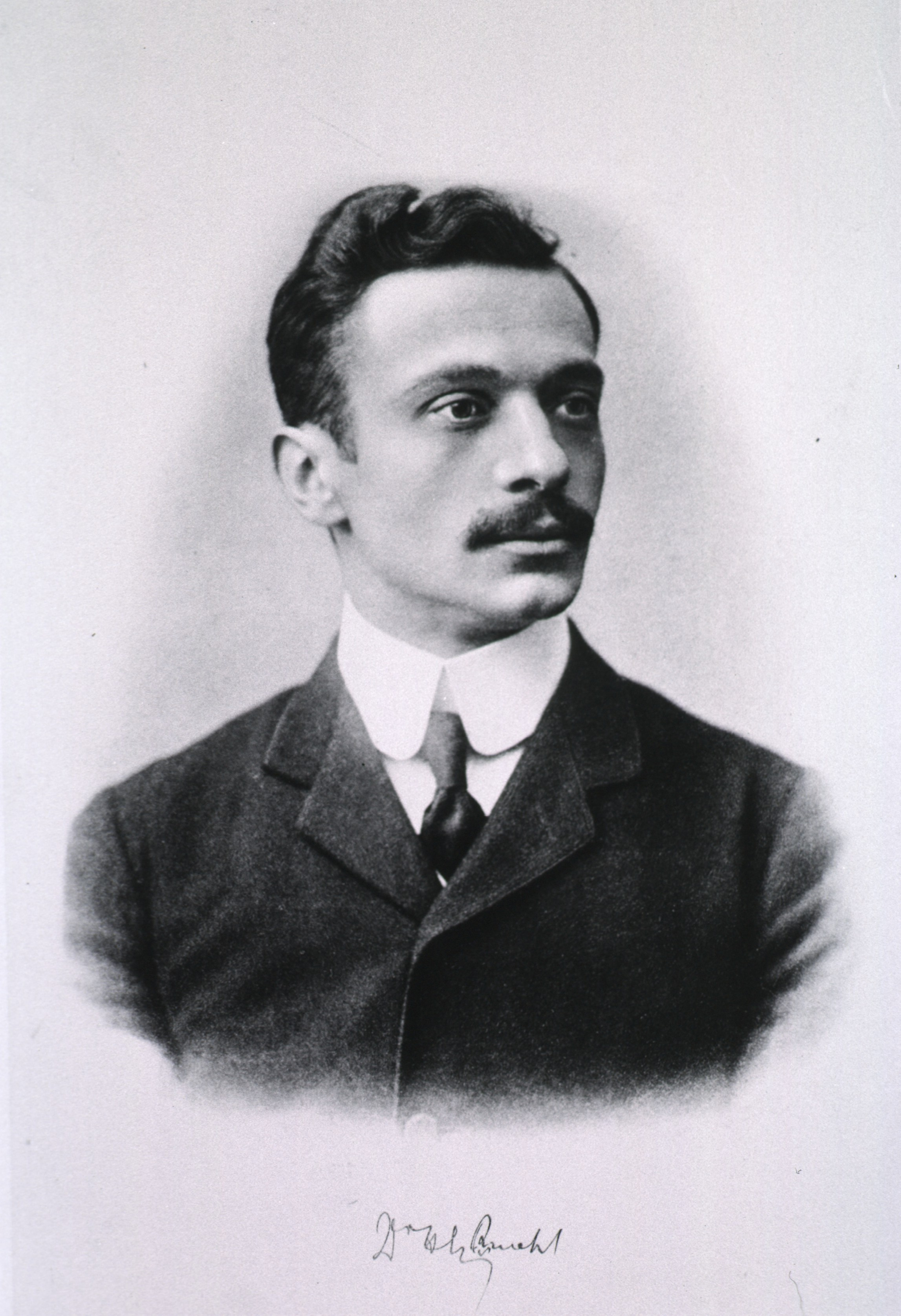

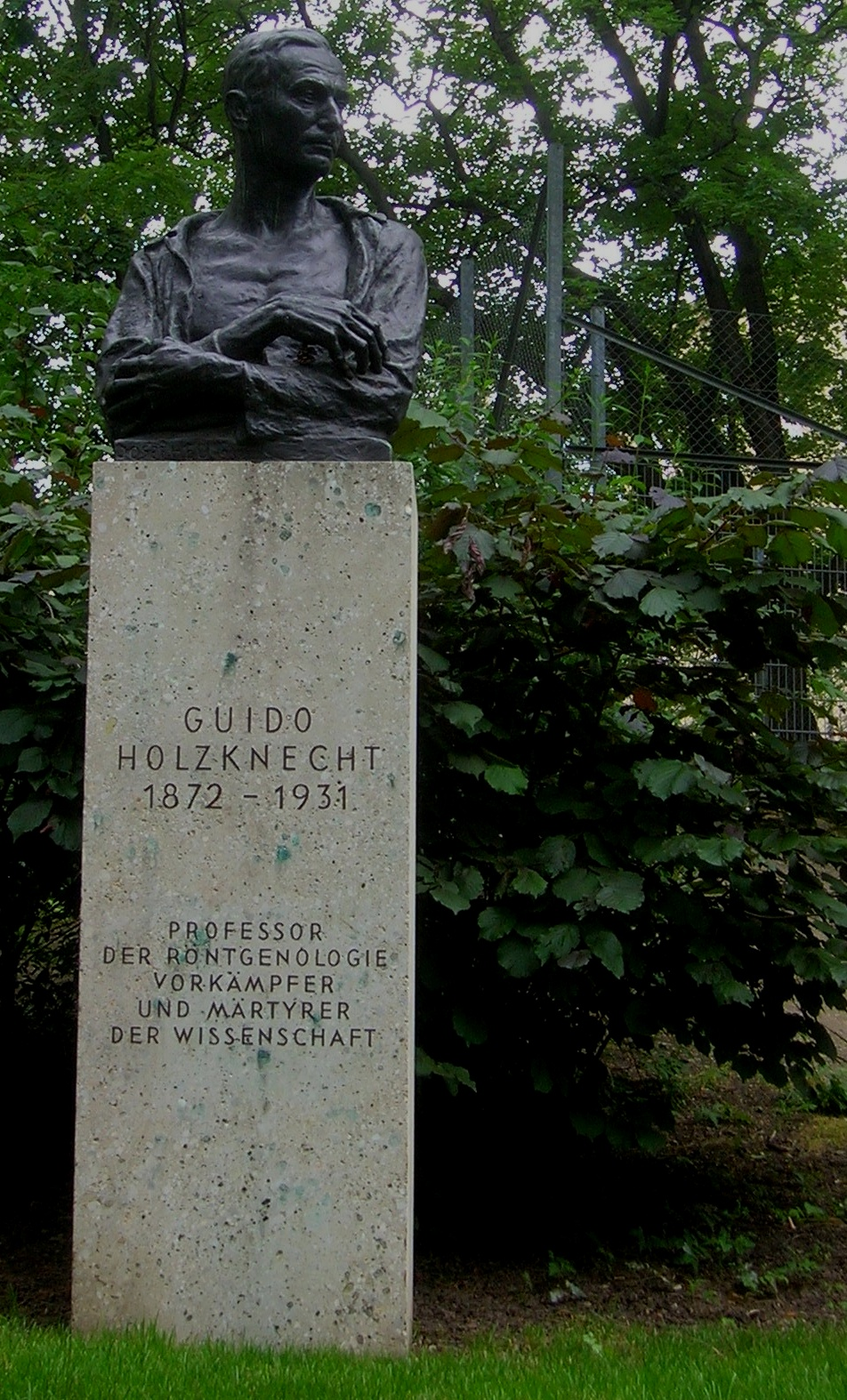
Bust in Vienna

Guido Holzknecht (3 December 1872 – 30 October 1931) was an Austrian radiologist who was a native of Vienna.

He studied in Strasbourg, Königsberg, and Vienna, and became the director of the X-ray laboratory at Vienna General Hospital in 1905 . He later established a central radiology department at the hospital, which became known as the Guido Holzknecht Institute. With radiologist Robert Kienböck (1871–1953), he was a co-founder of the Wiener Röntgengesellschaft (Vienna Radiology Society).

The statue of Holzknecht in Arne Carlsson Park was originally made by Josef Josephu. Damaged during the Second World War, it was later restored incorrectly. The family had commissioned Josephu to show missing fingers that Holzknecht had lost due to radiation poisoning. The restored statue shows all of his fingers intact. Additionally, the signature on the restored statue reads JosefHeu, who left Vienna during the War - misspelling the original artist's name.

Guido Holzknecht was a pioneer in radiology. In 1902 he devised a color dosimeter (referred to as a "chromoradiometer") for detecting and measuring X-rays. Like a number of other physicians in the early days of radiology, he died from the consequences of radiation poisoning in October 1931 aged 58. He was cremated at Feuerhalle Simmering, where also his ashes are buried.

Holzknecht joined the Vienna Psychoanalytic Society in 1910. He later also treated Sigmund Freud, making an unsuccessful adjuvant irradiation attempt for Freud's oral cavity squamous cell carcinoma (to which Freud eventually succumbed).

His name is included on the Monument to the X-ray and Radium Martyrs of All Nations erected in Hamburg, Germany in 1936.

== Associated eponym ==
- Holzknecht's space, also known as retro-cardiac space. It is located between the posterior wall of the heart and the vertebral column.

== Selected writings ==
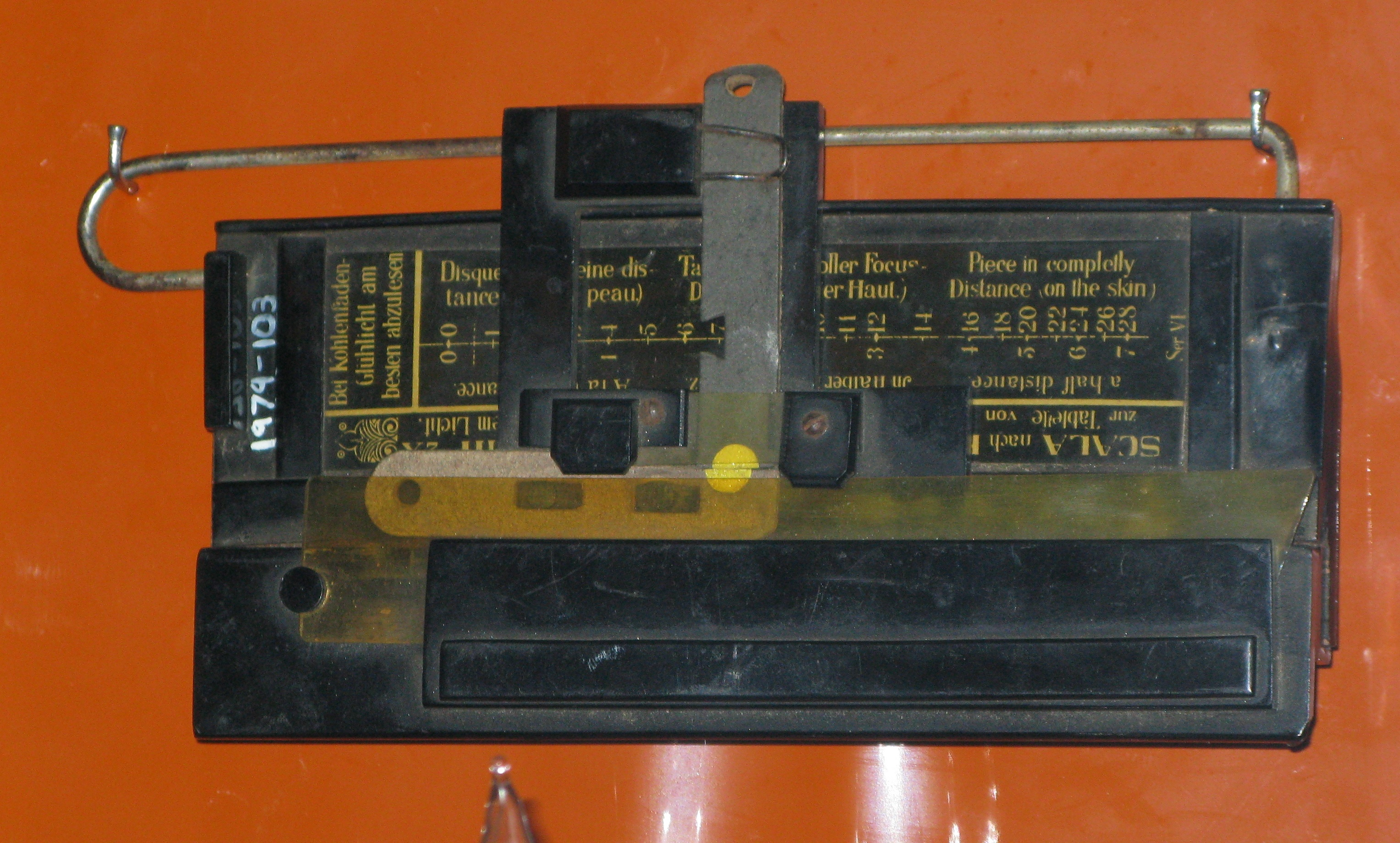
A Holzknecht chromoradiometer

- Röntgenologische Diagnostik der Erkrankung der Brusteingeweide (Radiological diagnostics of breast cancer), 1901
- Röntgendiagnostik des Magenkrebses (1905).
- Röntgenologie, 2 vols., (Radiology) 1918/1924
- Röntgentherapie, (X-ray therapy) 1924
- Einstellung zur Röntgenologie, (Attitudes to radiology) 1927
- Handbuch der theoretischen und klinischen Röntgenkunde, 2 vols., (Handbook of theoretical and clinical X-ray studies), (1929).
