= Copacabana Fort revolt =

1922 Brazilian military revolt

- Part of Tenentism
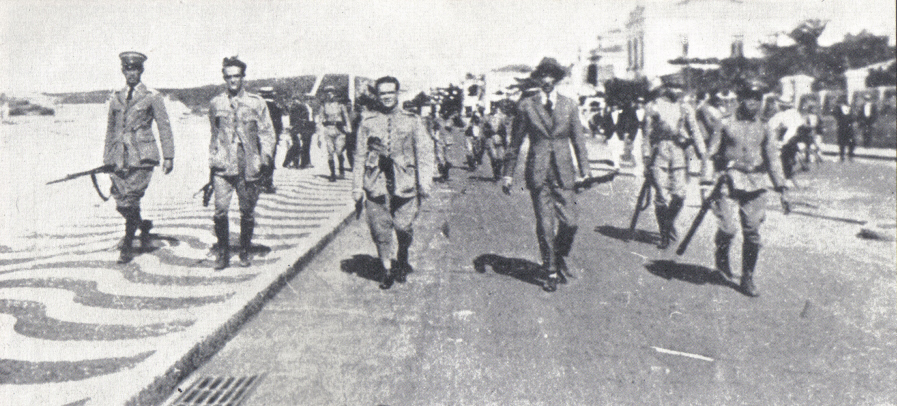
- The last rebels in their "march to death" From left to right: Eduardo Gomes, Siqueira Campos, Newton Prado and Otávio Correia, a civilian
Date	4–6 July 1922 (Rio de Janeiro); 5–13 July (Mato Grosso)
Location	Rio de Janeiro, Niterói and Mato Grosso
Result	Government victory

Belligerents
Army and civilian rebels	Brazil: Brazilian Army; Brazilian Navy; Federal District Police; São Paulo Police (Note: The military character of the Military Police/Public Force at the time is discussed in Public Forces (Brazil).)

Commanders and leaders
Hermes da Fonseca (Note: Marshal, leader of the rebels.); Clodoaldo da Fonseca (Note: Brigadier general, commander of the 1st Military Circumscription.); João de Brito Júnior (Note: Colonel, director of the Army's cartridge factory and commander of the rebels in the Military School.); Euclides da Fonseca (Note: Captain, commander of Fort Copacabana.); Siqueira Campos (Note: 1st lieutenant, commander of Fort Copacabana after the exit of Euclides da Fonseca.)	Epitácio Pessoa; Setembrino de Carvalho (Note: Divisional general, Chief of Staff of the Army and responsible for the loyalist operations in the capital.); João N. da Costa (Note: Colonel, commander of the land forces in the siege of Fort Copacabana.); Tertuliano Potiguara (Note: Colonel, took part in the final battle at Copacabana and commanded the loyalist forces sent against the rebels in Mato Grosso.)

Units involved
1st Isolated Coastal Artillery Battery; Military School of Realengo; 1st Military Circumscription; 7th Company of the 1st Infantry Regiment	1st Military Region; 2nd Military Region

Strength
638 students in the Military School; ~300 men in Fort Copacabana; 800–1,000 men in Mato Grosso	10,000 men in Rio de Janeiro; 2 battleships; 1 destroyer

Casualties and losses
1 killed and several wounded in the Military School; In Copacabana: see casualties	3 killed and 5 wounded at Vila Militar (Note: 2 killed and 5 wounded in the battle against Vila Militar and captain José Barbosa Monteiro, killed in the inssurrection inside the Vila at night.); 2 killed and 1 wounded at the Army HQ; In Copacabana: see casualties
- At least 5 civilians killed and 2 injured (Note: 4 killed in the bombardment of the Ministry of War building and 1 killed and 2 wounded in Copacabana. Donato 1987, p. 436, mentions dozens of civilians killed in their homes during the artillery duel between the fortifications.)

The Copacabana Fort revolt (Portuguese: Revolta do Forte de Copacabana), also known as the 18 of the Fort revolt (Revolta dos 18 do Forte), was one of several movements coordinated by rebel factions of the Brazilian Army against the president of Brazil, Epitácio Pessoa, and the winner of the 1922 presidential election, Artur Bernardes. Acting under the figure of marshal Hermes da Fonseca and supporting the defeated faction, the Republican Reaction, the rebels tried a wide revolt in Rio de Janeiro on 5 July 1922, but only managed to control Fort Copacabana and the Military School of Realengo, in addition to, outside the city, a focus in Niterói and the 1st Military Circumscription, in Mato Grosso. They were defeated, but the revolt marks the beginning of tenentism and the events that led to the end of the First Brazilian Republic.

In 1921, Nilo Peçanha launched himself as an opposition presidential candidate, aligning the oligarchies of second-tier states against the domination of Brazilian politics by the most powerful states of São Paulo and Minas Gerais. Peçanha garnered the support of dissident military members gathered around Hermes da Fonseca, president of the Military Club. In October, fake letters attributed to Artur Bernardes insulting the military stirred up the election and prompted them to actively participate in the campaign. The rigged electoral system ensured Bernardes' victory in March 1922. The opposition contested the results and over the following months a military conspiracy emerged across the country to remove Epitácio Pessoa and prevent Bernardes' inauguration. The conspiracy drew great enthusiasm from tenentes (lieutenants), but few senior officers. The rebels did not have a project for society, with the rebellion being a movement of redress at first, but even so they reflected dissatisfaction with the regime. In early July, the revolt was triggered by the closure of the Military Club and the brief arrest of Hermes da Fonseca for his public opposition to the government's interference, using the army, in the election in Pernambuco.

The conspiracy was poorly organized and on the night of 4 July the loyalists managed to surround Fort Copacabana and arrest the officers who would incite the large number of troops at Vila Militar. The following day, Hermes da Fonseca was arrested and the Military School engaged in combat for a few hours against Vila Militar before giving up. In Niterói, the revolt did little more than capture the Telephone Company. In Mato Grosso, the rebels confronted the loyalists on the border with São Paulo until 13 July, when they laid down their weapons without initiating combat. Only Fort Copacabana remained in revolt, firing at military targets and engaging in an "artillery duel" with the other fortifications in Guanabara Bay, which killed several civilians. Most of the garrison left the fort on the morning of 6 April, with only 28 remaining. It withstood further bombardments by the Brazilian Navy, Naval Aviation and surrounding troops, refusing to surrender. The fort's commander left to negotiate and was arrested, leaving command to Antônio de Siqueira Campos and three other lieutenants. In the afternoon they left for Atlântica Avenue with the remaining soldiers to face the loyalists, being defeated on the beach by much superior forces. Of the lieutenants, only Siqueira Campos and Eduardo Gomes survived in the hospital.

The July 1922 revolts failed, but Artur Bernardes would face a new military phenomenon, tenentism, which launched ever larger and more sophisticated revolts during his term, most of which was spent under a state of emergency. The refusal of amnesty to the rebels of 1922 was one of the reasons for the following revolts. These also failed, but the tenentists took part in the Revolution of 1930, which put an end to the First Republic. The greatest fame of July 1922 was the Fort Copacabana and the suicidal will of the small number of rebels who marched against the government's troops, an episode that acquired a mythical character. The number of 18 men said to have participated in the final combat is famous, but the actual number was probably smaller.

== Background ==
=== The 1922 presidential election ===
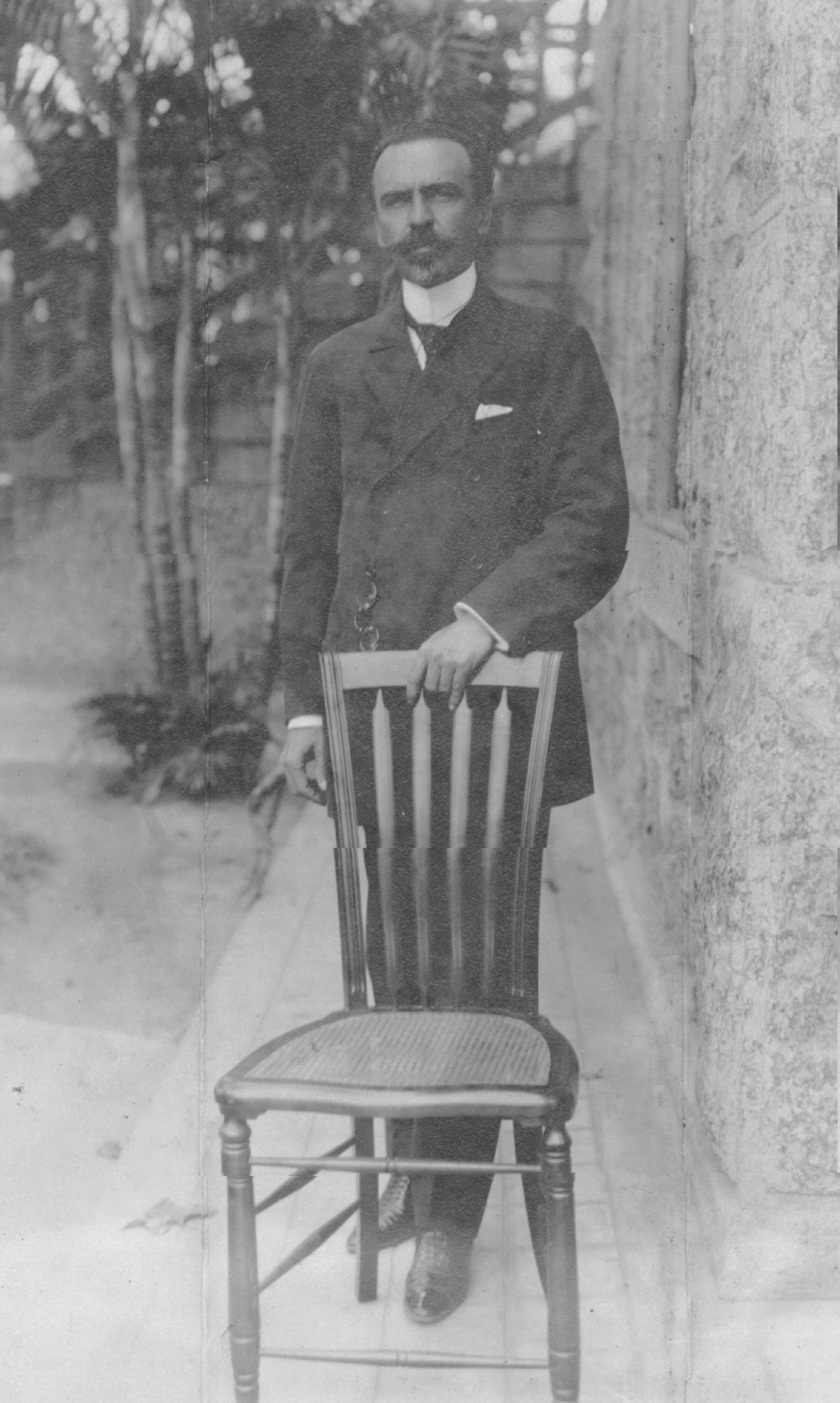
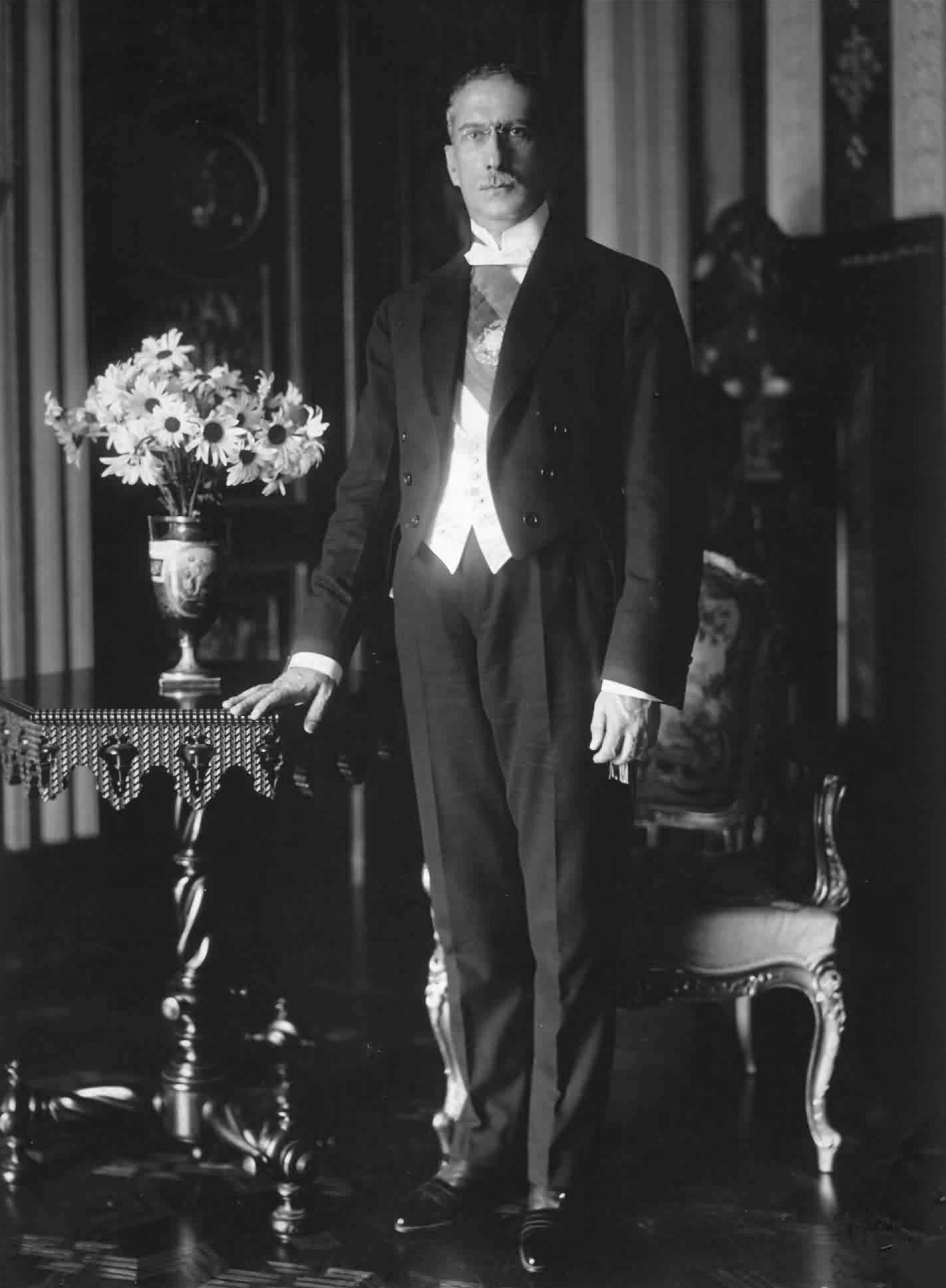
Nilo Peçanha and Artur Bernardes with the presidential sash

In 1922, Brazil was undergoing a reassessment of Brazilian nationality on the eve of the country's independence centennial, with the Modern Art Week as a symbolic milestone, while public finances suffered from the fall of international demand for coffee, Brazil's main export product. In the presidential election, scheduled for 1 March, the government candidate to succeed Epitácio Pessoa was Artur Bernardes, president (governor) of Minas Gerais and a representative of the dominant groups of his state and São Paulo. In previous disputes, the government's candidate easily achieved the consensus of the regional oligarchies, but this time the regime showed signs of exhaustion.

In June 1921, the political leaders of Rio de Janeiro, Bahia, Rio Grande do Sul and Pernambuco, "second-tier" states, organized themselves in the Republican Reaction bloc and launched an opposition ticket with Nilo Peçanha, from Rio de Janeiro, for president, and José Joaquim Seabra, from Bahia, for vice president. Several explanations have been proposed for this oligarchic split, such as the dispute over the vice presidency, the dissatisfaction with the economic policy favorable to coffee, a first test of populism or a challenge to the domination of the federal system by Minas Gerais and São Paulo. Some studies show the instability of the Minas Gerais-São Paulo alliance, but there was, in any case, dissatisfaction with the political arrangement.

The Republican Reaction's proposals were reformist and peaceful. It did not intend to break with the model of the First Brazilian Republic, but only to achieve equality between the states, and its state leaders had the same profile and practices as the government's ones; in his state, Nilo Peçanha also applied coronelism practices, and the Reaction sought the support of disaffected oligarchs. In the electoral game of the First Republic, based on the coronelist compromise, the Republican Reaction was at a disadvantage, as it could not use the federal public machine to grant privileges and favors. Thus, the Reaction added to traditional methods the campaign among the urban masses, a novelty at the time, as well as the search for military support. Military officers gathered around marshal Hermes da Fonseca joined Nilo Peçanha's ticket after Fonseca failed to get a candidacy. Fonseca was the president of the Military Club, former president of Brazil and the "virtual head of the army", "perceived by the military as the hierarchical superior of all".

=== Military discontent ===
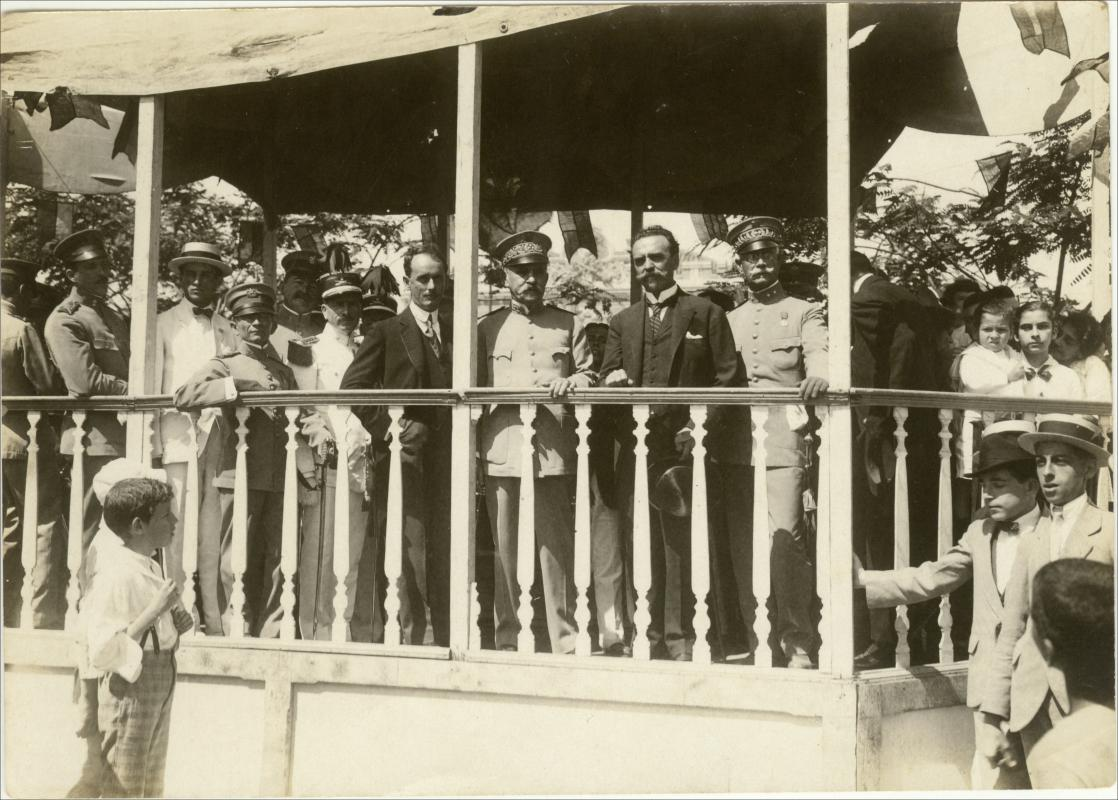
Nilo Peçanha and military supportes

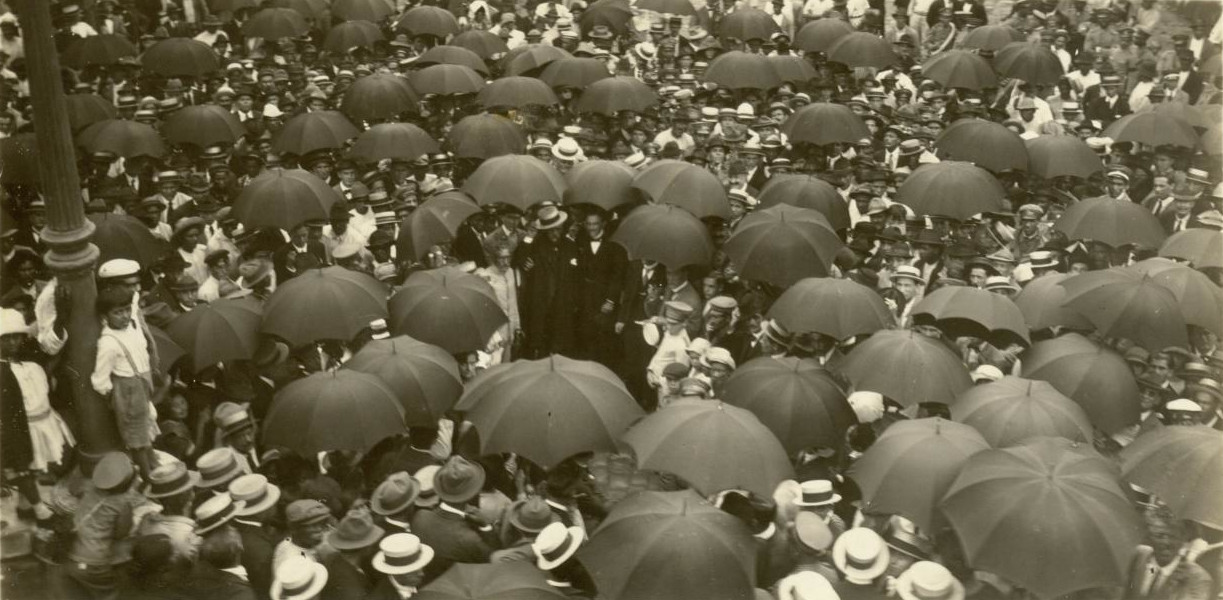
Nilo Peçanha campaigning in Vitória for the upcoming elections, 1921

In the 1920s, the Brazilian Army was reformed and modernized under the management of Minister of War Pandiá Calógeras and advice from the French Military Mission, fulfilling the ambitions of the Young Turks years before. The young officers left the Military School of Realengo with a level of technical preparation unprecedented in the history of the Brazilian Army. But there were tensions within the officer corps. Officials were frustrated with the scorn they received from the public. Lieutenants were discouraged by their slow career progression and their failure to join and fight in World War I. Calógeras' management and the French Mission attracted criticism, accusations of corruption and difficulties in adapting to the new models. In April 1921, the dismissal of general Bento Ribeiro, chief of the Brazilian Army General Staff and an enemy of Calógeras, generated a demonstration of solidarity by more than one hundred officers, threatening to split the army, but Ribeiro was not interested in a revolt. The fact that the Ministers of War and Navy, Calógeras and Raul Soares, respectively, were both civilians was used in Nilo Peçanha's criticisms.

==== Crisis of the fake letters ====
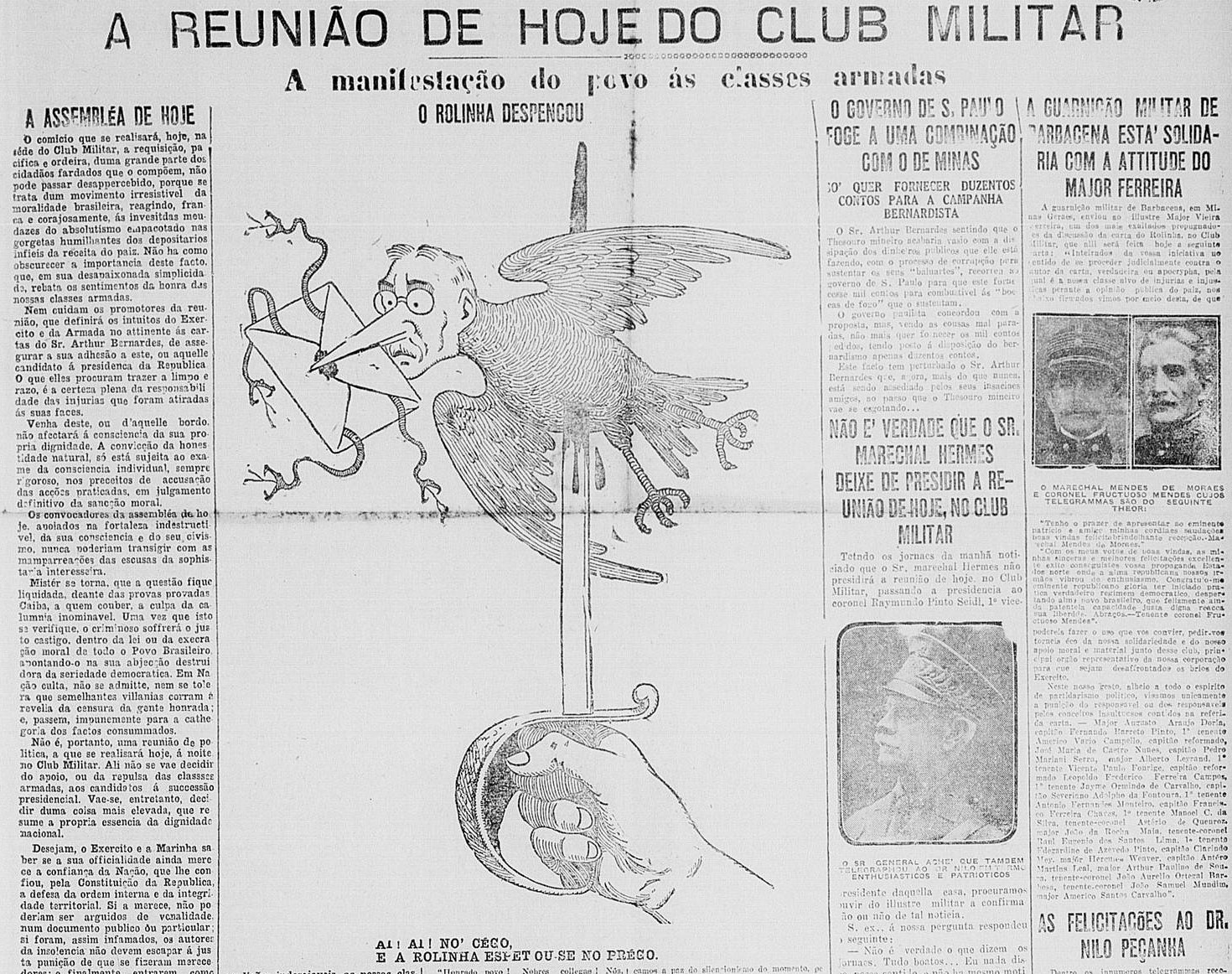
Illustration in the anti-Bernardes newspaper A Rua about the alleged letters

The rapprochement between the Republican Reaction and the military reached its peak with the disclosure of fake letters attributed to Artur Bernardes, with insulting content to the military, in order to position them against his candidacy. There were two documents published in Correio da Manhã in October 1921 as part of the newspaper's anti-Bernardes campaign. The author of the letters called Hermes a "sergeant without manners", tapping into the resentment of army officers for the disdain they received from the civilian elite. The crisis was similar to the Military Crisis at the final days of the Brazilian Empire. The Military Club examined the letters attributed to Artur Bernardes and assessed them as true. Its creators ended up confessing to the forgery, but tensions in the military environment increased. Bernardes' explanations ended up being accepted by most of the officers, with the exception of a minority of captains and lieutenants. After the Military Club's examination, officers in uniform and armed campaigned for the opposition. "The garrisons and the Military School itself were fermenting with revolt". The atmosphere at the Club was unruly and angry.

==== Election ====
The election took place in an agitated atmosphere, and government supporters, controlling the official machine, secured Artur Bernardes' victory in March 1922. It was widely known that the ballot boxes were rigged. Unlike previous elections, the opposition contested the results and called for a Court of Honor to arbitrate the process. To maintain the pressure, it radicalized its speech and suggested a way out by force. In April, J.J. Seabra spoke: "If this patriotic and honorable solution by the Court of Arbitration is not accepted, we will have a struggle and bloodshed". Government supporters were not intimidated. In May Raul Soares replied: "If the armed classes think they have the right to make a revolution, we think it is our duty to quell it". This intransigence accelerated radicalization. The opposition press denounced the arrests and transfers of anti-Bernardes lieutenants. On 7 June, Congress confirmed the results of the election. The oppositionists were removed from the Chamber of Deputies committees and from the electoral recognition work. All that remained was to appeal to the military.

Nilo Peçanha engaged in military agitation only as a form of pressure and did not want a revolt, but rather a popular movement before Congress on inauguration day on 15 November. He was listed in the police inquiry following the uprising, but the charges that he was implicated in the uprising were not substantiated. Different from what Peçanha planned, a military movement on a national scale was outlined with the goals of removing Epitácio Pessoa and preventing the inauguration of Artur Bernardes. For years, criticism of electoral fraud had paved the way for the idea of a violent solution.

=== Profile of the rebels ===
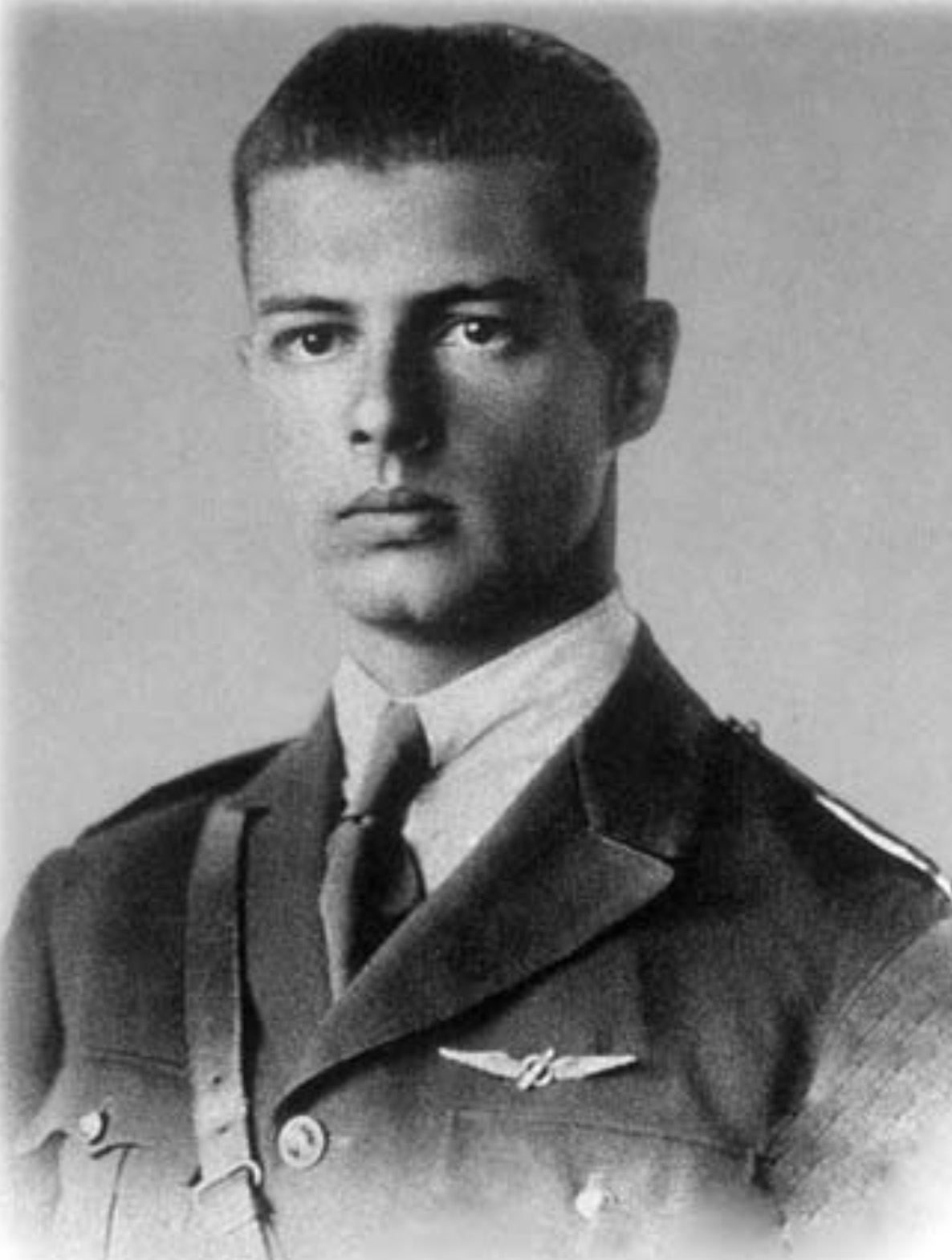
Lieutenant Eduardo Gomes

The mobilization that would culminate in the armed revolt sought to purify the armed forces from the interference of civilian politics and restore the pride of the army. Dissident soldiers considered politics dominated by the "low and private interests" of status quo supporters; for them, civilian politicians had betrayed the Republic, which had been proclaimed by the army. They were dissatisfied with the army's position in society, not accepting obedience without question. Their rebellious inclinations came from esprit de corps, rather than a conscious plan to remake society, which would come in later movements. There was no revolutionary manifesto in the midst of the revolt; rather it was at first an institutional one, defending military honor against the figure of Artur Bernardes. It was, nevertheless, the expression of a revolutionary climate and the wear and tear of the regime that was not very open to new political, economic and social demands. Participants had the identity of a moral elite capable of defeating the oligarchies.

Low-ranking soldiers were high among the insurgents, but few senior officers joined the conspiracy. The biggest exception was Hermes da Fonseca himself, who lent his name to the rebellion. Fonseca had several possible motives: the offenses he suffered, the desire to regain his reputation, the influence of his children and dissatisfaction with the election results. The commanders of Fort Copacabana and the garrison of Mato Grosso, who participated in the revolt, were his relatives. The rebels were mostly beneficiaries of investments in military education in the previous years, with a mixture of instructors from the "Missão Indígena" at the Military School of Realengo, new graduates, and junior officers with recent French training. They had strong bonds built in the Military School; a few years earlier, Siqueira Campos, Eduardo Gomes and other future revolutionaries discussed politics and the First World War outside the school. The lieutenants, as the lowest sector from the officialdom, lived closer to the population's needs. They were numerous, but still needed a prestigious officer to lead them, a role played by Hermes da Fonseca.

The revolt arose only in one faction within the army, which, as an institution, remained loyal to the power structure. By mid-1922 the officer corps split between loyalists and revolutionaries, both of whom believed in a civic role for the army, but the revolutionaries believed in ending regionalism and corruption. Only a minority took up arms. They had support or sympathy among the urban population and some politicians, such as Maurício de Lacerda.

=== Conspiracy activity ===
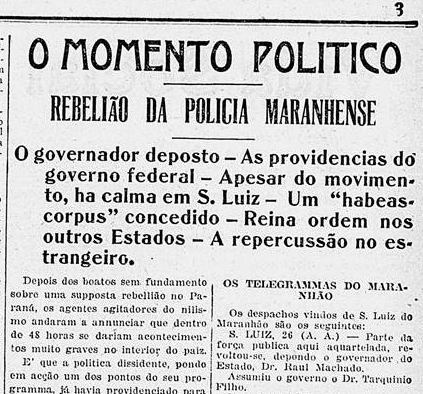
O Paiz associating the incidents in Maranhão and Paraná with "agitating agents of Nilo Peçanha"

Confirmation of Bernardes' victory was met with destabilizing uprisings. In April, the Public Force of Maranhão deposed the government of Raul da Cunha Machado for one day; similar movements occurred in Paraná and Santa Catarina. There was an attempt at a rebellion on the Navy's ships. In Ceará, there was an incident between the governor and the officers. In Alagoas, the troops paraded singing a little song against the official candidate. Some young naval aviators at Enxadas Island planned an air attack on the presidential motorcade. It was in this climate, and after incidents like these, that the July uprising would come.

At the time of the election, there were already conspiratorial discussions in Rio de Janeiro, including among Hermes da Fonseca's sons, but without the coordination of high-ranking military personnel. They intended to prevent the presidential inauguration. Some police officers and sergeants loyal to the government had infiltrated the conspirators. In February, the journal Estado de S. Paulo published a circular, signed "The Army", which revealed there was a conspiracy to depose state governors and the president and hand over power to Nilo Peçanha or a dictator. In May, Epitácio Pessoa was already discussing the conspiracy behind the scenes. He had transferred the suspected officers far from the capital and appointed reliable replacements, but he still thought that Artur Bernardes should resign, since "he will not last 24 hours in the Catete".

After the defeat in Mato Grosso, general Clodoaldo da Fonseca declared that he hoped to count on the army and the Military Brigade of Rio Grande do Sul, and the movement could come at the end of October. Previously, he had described a plan on a national scale to his officers, with support in São Paulo, Bahia and Minas Gerais. In Pará, officers who could have participated in the revolt had been transferred before it began, such as lieutenant Pires Camargo, from the 3rd Company of the 26th Battalion of Caçadores, who had threatened to use weapons during the electoral campaign.

Rumors about an uprising in Mato Grosso had been circulating in the press since May, and even then the conspirators were already making their connections, with an intended start in Ponta Porã. After the defeat of the revolt, the inquiry of one of the lieutenants gave 16 June as the planned start date, although this may have been a typographical error and the date would be in July. If in June, the date would be a week after the opinion of the president of Congress, the Mato Grosso senator Antônio Azeredo, recognizing the victory of Artur Bernardes. Senate approval could be the pretext for revolt. On 27 June, Gazeta de Notícias reported an imminent revolutionary movement in the state.

=== Hermes da Fonseca's arrest ===
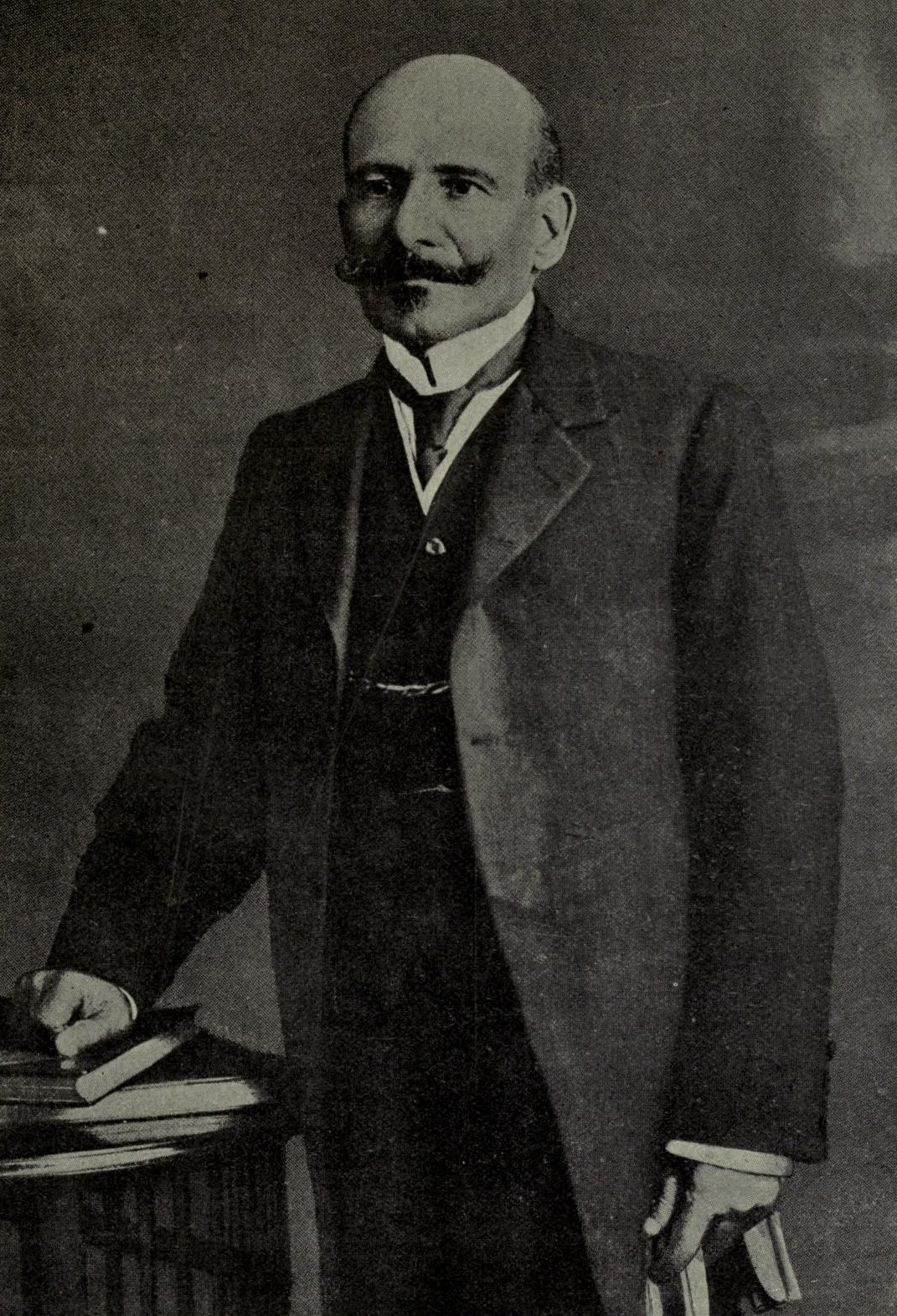
Hermes da Fonseca

On 29 June, Hermes da Fonseca sent a telegram to colonel Jaime Pessoa da Silveira, commander of the 6th Military Region, in Pernambuco, advising him to deny his support to the faction favored by the government in the state political dispute. The faction in the Pernambuco government, favorable to the Republican Reaction, had defeated the opposition, including relatives of Epitácio Pessoa, in the gubernatorial election on 27 May. (Note: On 27 March 1922, the death of governor José Rufino Bezerra Cavalcanti sparked a dispute between situationist José Henrique Carneiro da Cunha, supported by senator Manoel Borba, and oppositionist Eduardo de Lima Castro. Carneiro da Cunha was victorious and violence ensued. Later, the threat of a federal intervention led to the inauguration of judge Sérgio Loreto as the result of an agreement between the two factions. CPDOC FGV 2015, LORETO, Sérgio Teixeira Lins de Barros.) The opposition contested the results and the state entered a climate of civil war. The president named a new commander, who brought in reinforcements from other states and used his troops on behalf of the opposition. (Note: Cunha 2011, citing Henry Hunt Keith, Soldados salvadores: as revoltas militares brasileiras de 1922 e 1924 em perspectiva histórica (1989), claims that colonel Jaime Pessoa ignored warnings from Epitácio Pessoa, his relative, not to intervene in Pernambuco's politics. According to Silva 1971, p. 40-41, Epitácio Pessoa denied having intervened in Pernambuco in his book, but his own daughter confirmed he did intervene. In his reply to Hermes, the colonel made it clear that he obeyed orders (p. 96).) Army soldiers killed dentist Tomás Coelho Filho, bringing national attention to the crisis. Thus, officials in Recife appealed to Hermes da Fonseca.

In the telegram, on behalf of the Military Club, Fonseca warned against the army's deviations, recalling that it "serves to defend the people, not attack them" and "political situations pass and the army remains". It was a call to disobey the presidential order. Jaime Pessoa resigned. Epitácio Pessoa did not let it go. As Hermes da Fonseca confirmed that the telegram was his own, the Ministry of War sent him a notice of reprimand. Offended, Hermes reiterated his statements on 2 July, declaring himself capable of expressing his opinion as "head of the National Army", a position legally held by the president. As a result, he received a 24-hour arrest warrant. He was taken to the 3rd Infantry Regiment, where he was released after 17 hours, at noon on 3 July. He was also removed from the presidency of the Military Club, which, due to assuming its participation, was closed for six months based on the Adolfo Gordo Law, which allowed the closure of brothels and anarchist establishments.

The arrest and closure were offensive to the dissident military and served as a trigger for the revolt. Still, these were pretexts, not causes, as the conspiracy had been developing for months. At Fort Copacabana, the bombing of the city had been planned for almost six months. Hermes da Fonseca considered the uprising premature, but after his arrest the spirits of the young officers were too high to prevent it. On the night of 4 July, with the revolt taking effect, he declared to one of his sons opposed to its beginning: "It is late for everything, my son: late to retreat, late to gather the strength I need".

== Outbreak in Rio de Janeiro ==
=== Plan of action ===
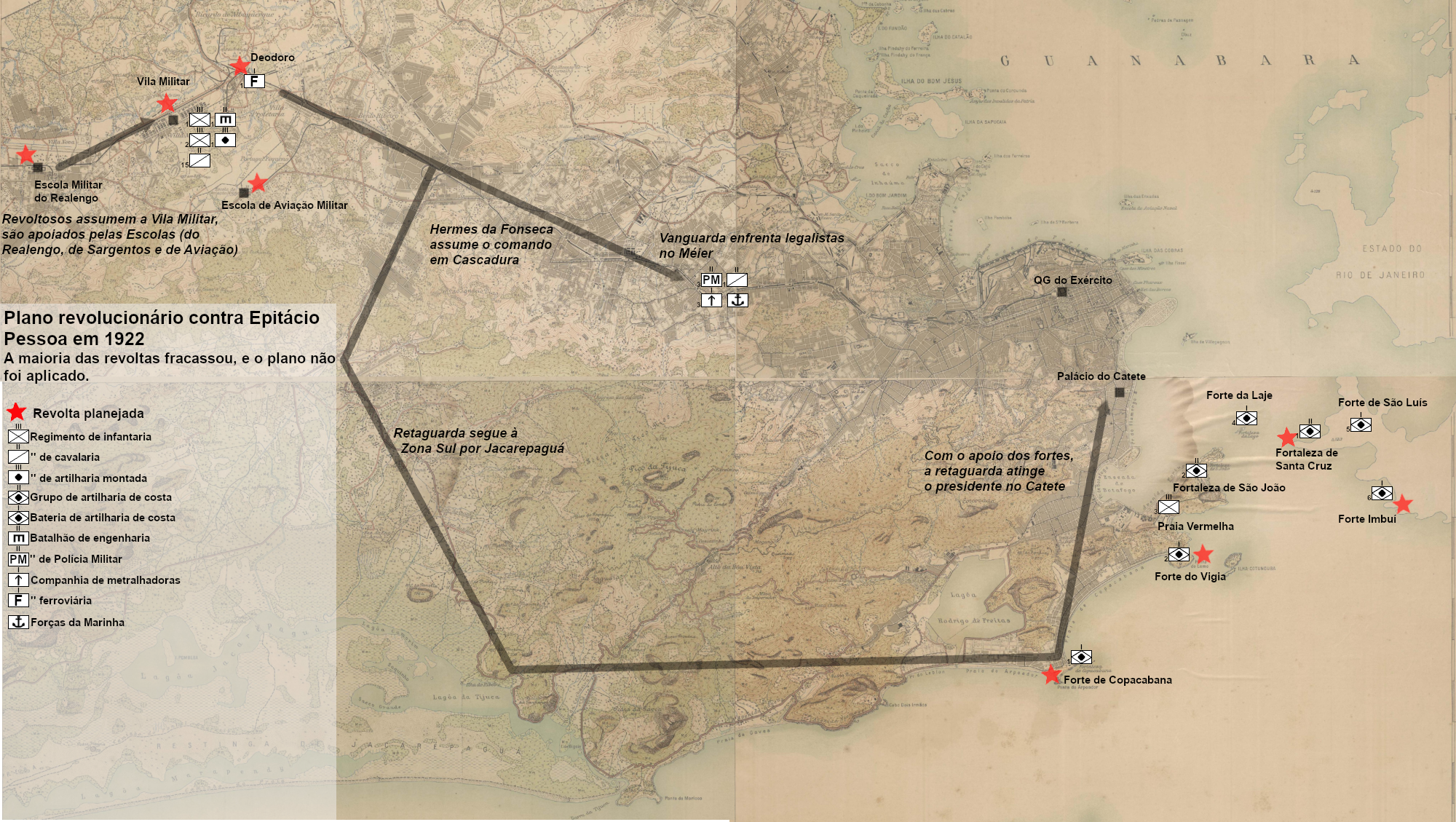
Revolutionary plan in Rio de Janeiro

The idea was to begin the revolt with the 1st Infantry Regiment in Vila Militar, where the command of the 1st Infantry Division and several units was located. (Note: Among them the command of the 1st Infantry Brigade, with the 1st and 2nd Infantry Regiments; the 2nd Brigade, whose units were outside Vila Militar; the command of the 1st Artillery Brigade, with the 1st Horse Artillery Regiment; the 1st Engineering Battalion; the 15th Independent Cavalry Regiment and the Assault Car Company. Savian 2023, p. 337 (Annex 1).) With the support of the Military School of Realengo, the School of Infantry Sergeants, the 1st Railway Company, the Engineering Battalion, the 15th Cavalry Regiment, the 2nd Artillery Regiment and the Aviation School, it would be possible to force the entire Vila Militar to join the rebellion, including the 2nd Infantry Regiment. Escorted by a picket of the 15th Cavalry Regiment, marshal Hermes da Fonseca would assume command in Cascadura, leading a vanguard to face loyalist forces of the Navy, the 3rd Infantry Battalion of the Military Police, the 1st Divisional Cavalry Regiment and the 3rd Machine Gun Company in Méier. Meanwhile, the rearguard would continue to the South Zone via Jacarepaguá, following the Pica-Pau road and Copacabana. Under the cover of the cannons of the forts of Copacabana and Santa Cruz, the two most important in Guanabara Bay, it would reach the president's headquarters in the Catete Palace.

The Ministry of War did not fear the bombing of the city by Fort Copacabana. Its 305mm guns were designed for tense fire, with low elevation, high muzzle velocity and a large projectile load. Thus, they would reach naval targets up to 23 kilometers away, but the São João hill would be a natural obstacle if they aimed for the center of Rio de Janeiro. However, Siqueira Campos and other artillerymen calculated new tables before the rebellion, reducing the projection load to modify the shooting angles. Thus, the cannons could fire over the mountains, threatening the city. One of them consulted the calculations with a professor of ballistics at the Military School, without explaining his intentions. Preparations at the fort began in advance, digging trenches, laying out barbed wire, stocking up on a month's worth of supplies, retaining personnel in the barracks, electrifying the networks, and moving the barracks and kitchen to protected locations. Ironically, the fort was the "apple of the eye" of minister Pandiá Calógeras, who treated its officers with special consideration, including Delso Mendes da Fonseca and Antônio de Siqueira Campos.

Overly optimistic that the rebellion would spread throughout the army, the conspirators acted with indiscretion. Thus, the government was aware of the risk of rebellion and was already taking preventive measures, transferring and removing suspected officers, especially in Vila Militar. The conspirators also had limited organization, with poor communication after the outbreak of the revolt. Some reports attested to a less elaborate conspiracy, with members who only learned about the uprising the day before. Many of those who were vehemently in favor of action did not act at the time of the revolt. Before the start, Hermes da Fonseca already had an "absolute premonition of defeat", due to the lack of organization, delay in contacts and the government's full knowledge of the action. He considered civilian allies to be inert and leakers of information. Vila Militar officers, on the other hand, were not all committed, and almost all were out of the barracks and under control. The marshal declared to his wife before the revolt: "The government controls everything. Telephones, telegraphs, trains and roads. There is no plan. These boys are crazy. They want to raze the city". The government already predicted the revolt of Fort Copacabana and other bodies such as the Military School.

=== Early loyalist reaction ===
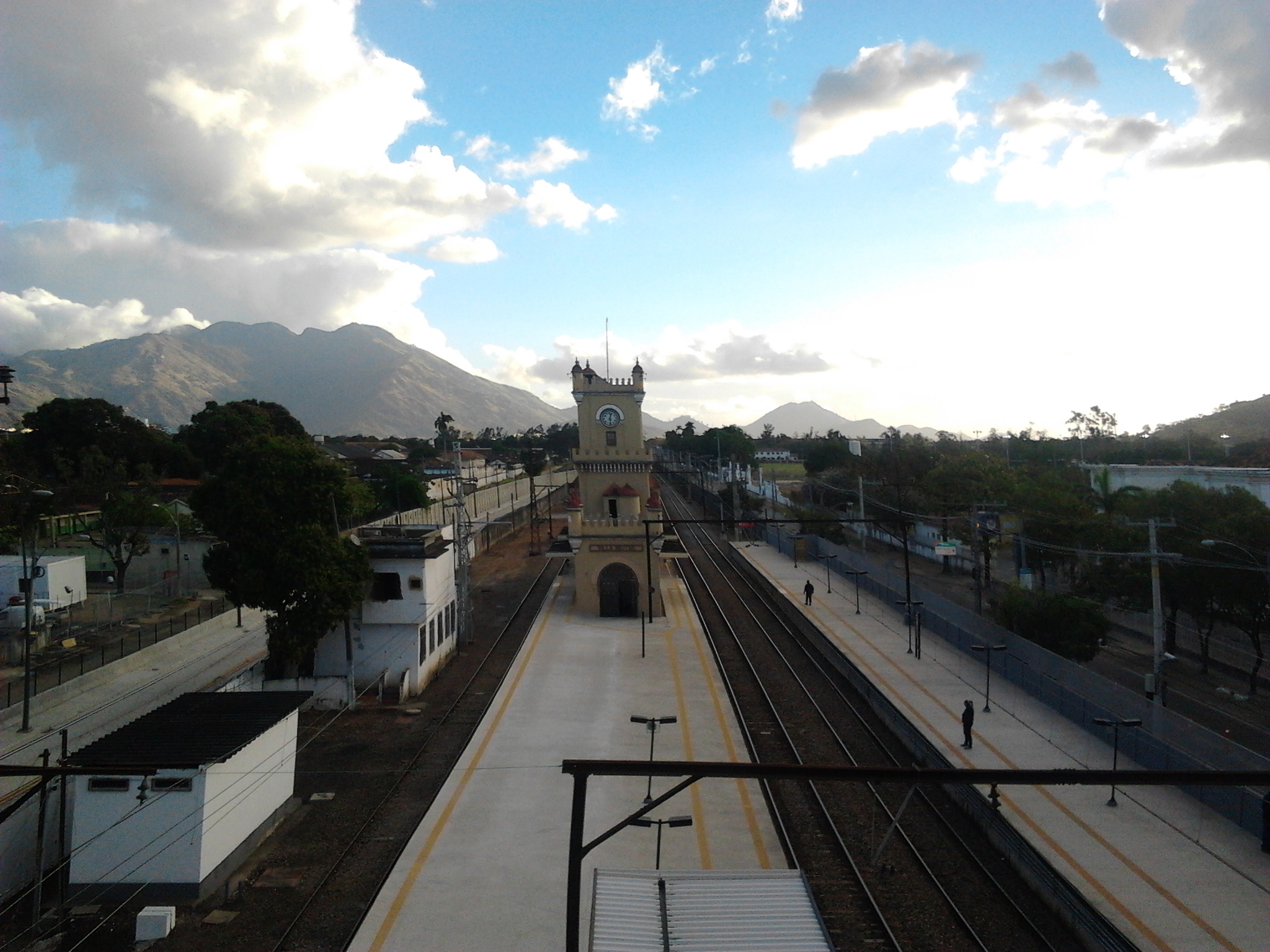
Vila Militar train station

On 4 July there was a meeting of the conspirators, with representatives from all the bodies in Rio de Janeiro. The government probably had insiders. The revolutionaries realized that some of them were identified by the government through their telephone contact with Fort Copacabana. In the afternoon, an excessive concentration of officers in Baiuca, quarters of the Officers Improvement School, confirmed the government's suspicions. Epitácio Pessoa's daughter claimed that he even knew in advance the time set for the revolt. At night, marshal Hermes had disappeared from the Palace Hotel, heading to Vila Militar, along with several suspicious officers, and the government already predicted the revolt of Fort Copacabana. Around 22:00, colonel Nestor Sezefredo dos Passos, commander of the 1st Infantry Regiment, assigned a company to lieutenant colonel Álvaro Guilherme Mariante, instructing him to arrest the suspected officers when they arrived by train at Vila Militar. Thus, the uprising was made impossible. Officials in Baiuca were also arrested, with the exception of a few who managed to escape. At stations on the Central do Brasil Railway, officers looking for trains were also arrested under orders of general Manuel Lopes Carneiro da Fontoura, commander of the 1st Military Region.

In the 1st Horse Artillery Regiment, the commander, colonel João José de Lima, gathered his officers in the casino and asked their opinions. All but two lieutenants were in favor of the revolution, and thus were arrested, leaving the regiment with the captains and sergeants. This was repeated in many units. In the words of lieutenant João Alberto Lins de Barros, one of the prisoners in that regiment,

On 4 July, at night, all of us revolutionaries were ready to raise the troops at the first signal... There were few of us, within a regiment considered loyalist and we needed support from outside the barracks to carry out the uprising... we were stuck with the impression that the movement had been aborted. Only after being transferred from the unit, when there was nothing else we could do, did we learn that the Military School and Fort Copacabana were in revolt.

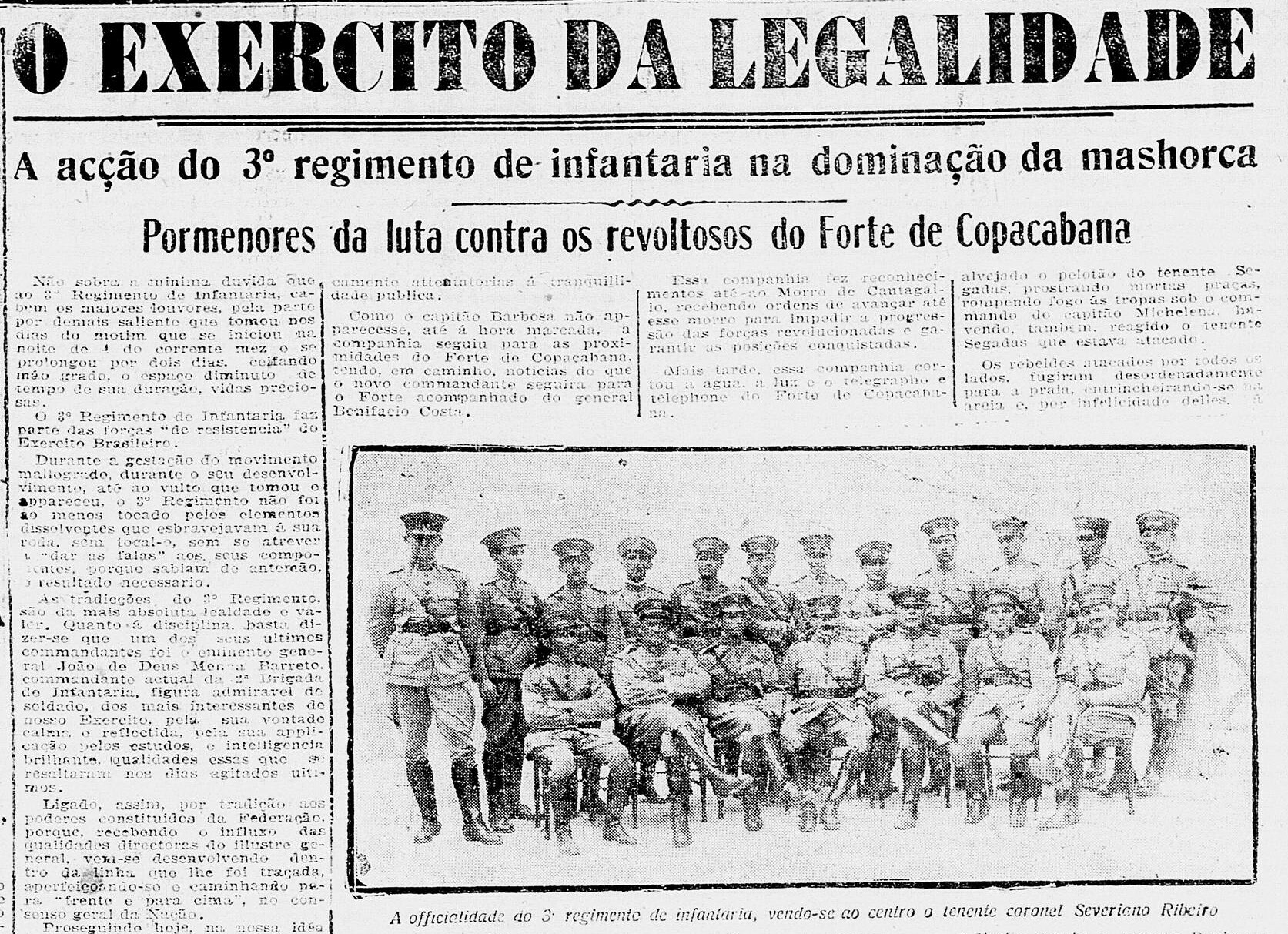
Newspaper report on the 3rd Infantry Regiment, which began the siege of Fort Copacabana

Lieutenant Telmo Borba, who was supposed to incite the School of Infantry Sergeants, could not fulfill his commitment. One of his fellow conspirators, lieutenant Luís Carlos Prestes, deputy commander of the 1st Railway Company, was sick. Captain Luís Gonzaga Borges Fortes tried to damage the field radiotelegraph station, mobilizing the Sapper Company of the 1st Engineering Battalion, but was defeated. The Aviation School was occupied by a loyalist battalion on the night of 4 to 5 July, when the revolutionary pilots were testing aircraft engines. Uprising attempts at the Santa Cruz fort and the 15th Cavalry Regiment also failed.

Two hundred revolutionary officers and soldiers entered the fort, being joined at 22:00 by a battery of 54 men from Fort Vigia. Among them was lieutenant Eduardo Gomes, who arrived in the afternoon. At 21:00 captain José da Silva Barbosa went to the Ministry of War, where he was charged with taking command of the 1st Coastal Artillery Battery, Fort Copacabana, to prevent the uprising. (Note: For the listing of the Coastal Artillery units and their respective forts, see Ministério da Guerra (1922). Relatório apresentado ao Presidente da República dos Estados Unidos do Brasil pelo Dr. João Pandiá Calógeras, Ministro de Estado da Guerra, em Outubro de 1922. Rio de Janeiro: Imprensa Nacional.) Captain Barbosa was accompanied by his superior, general Bonifácio Gomes da Costa, commander of the 1st Coastal Artillery District, and a company from the 3rd Infantry Regiment. The general and the captain entered the fort at 23:30, without escort, where soldiers were preparing trenches and barbed wire and carrying ammunition and a cart with a 190mm cannon. Captain Euclides Hermes da Fonseca, commander of the fort, suggested that the transfer be carried out the following morning, but general Bonifácio, after communicating with general Fontoura, did not accept it. The fort commander arrested the two envoys.

Captain Libânio da Cunha Matos, commander of the 3rd Infantry Regiment's company, went to the fort, where general Bonifácio ordered his company to return to the barracks. He did not give the order a literal interpretation and instead occupied Túnel Novo. Another company, the 3rd, was already at Barata Ribeiro Street at that time. The rebels had mined the ground around the fort. While the captain was out of command, his lieutenants Álvaro Barbosa Lima and Mário Tamarindo Carpenter also went to the fort. Carpenter joined in, while Lima managed to flee.

== The revolts ==
=== Rio de Janeiro ===
==== First revolutionary actions ====
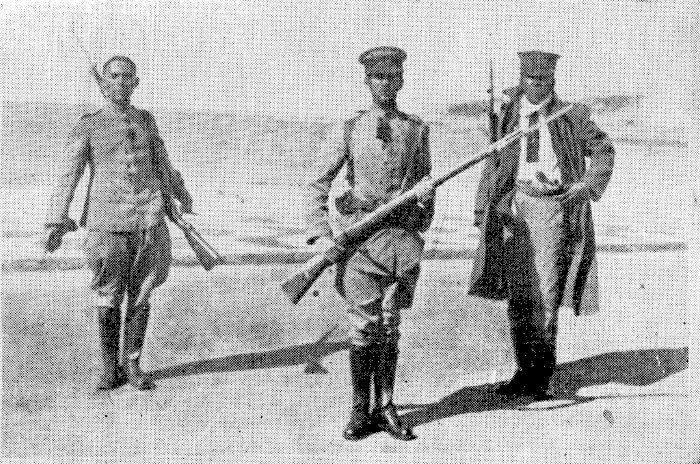
Rebel soldiers from Fort Copacabana

The director of the army's Cartridge Factory, colonel João Maria Xavier de Brito Júnior, removed the ammunition for use in the revolt from the nearby Military School of Realengo. The instructor officers (Note: Among them Odylio Denys, Ciro do Espírito Santo Cardoso, Vitor César da Cunha Cruz, Roberto Carlos Vasco Carneiro de Mendonça, Ilídio Rômulo Colônia, Aristóteles de Souza Dantas, Eugênio Ewerton Pinto, Henrique Ricardo Hall, Stênio Caio de Albuquerque Lima, Brasiliano Americano Freire, Juarez Távora, Edmundo de Macedo Soares e Silva, Hugo Bezerra and Arlindo Mauriti da Cunha Menezes. Silva 1971, p. 183. Exército Brasileiro, s/d also lists Tristão de Alencar Araripe, Newton de Andrade Cavalcanti, Gustavo Cordeiro de Farias, Olympio Falconière da Cunha and Canrobert Pereira da Costa.) armed the students. Nine cadets refused to participate, as well as some officers, being arrested as a result. At 23:50, captain Oton de Oliveira Santos, in charge of the night watch by orders of the school's director, general Eduardo Monteiro de Barros, found colonel Brito with a large number of officers and students in his house, which would normally be closed and with the lights off at this time. Upon being called to enter, Oton fired two shots in the air and ran to the general's house. Monteiro de Barros headed for the Military School, but on the way rebel patrols fired in his direction. He intended to seek reinforcements in Vila Militar, but ended up being arrested. (Note: Doria 2016 has a different narrative. Quoting Edgard Carone, he only presents the general responsible as having been awakened at midnight and arrested after refusing to join the rebels.) Oton was also captured by the rebels before reaching Vila Militar.

Shortly before 01:00, at night, lieutenant Frederico Cristiano Buiz woke up the soldiers of his company, the 7th Company of the 1st Infantry Regiment, and divided them into two platoons. One stayed in front of the barracks, while he led the other to the regimental officers' casino, where captain José Barbosa Monteiro (commander of the company), colonel Sezefredo dos Passos and others were. With his pistol in hand and in front of his armed soldiers, he declared — "The revolution has broken out! I am with the revolution!" Despite being unarmed, Sezefredo dos Passos advanced against Buiz and grabbed his pistol. The other officers also confronted the platoon, and captain Monteiro was killed in the clash. Buiz missed the opportunity, allowing himself to be restrained. Officers who were not yet on the government's side were arrested. (Note: Among them, lieutenant Artur da Costa e Silva (Doria 2016, ch. 12).) For his act of bravery, the regiment's commander was later promoted to general.

Marshal Hermes left his hotel at 23:00. He would wait for the 15th Cavalry Regiment near Vila Militar. He went in one of three cars, being intercepted at the Engenho de Dentro station by a squadron of the 1st Divisional Cavalry Regiment. After abandoning the car, they managed to reach the farm belonging to deputy Mário Hermes, near Marechal Hermes station. The picket of the 15th Cavalry Regiment arrived, but to arrest the marshal. General Ribeiro da Costa announced his arrest at 06:00 in the morning. Hermes was kept in the battleship Floriano. His presence in Vila Militar could have had a great impact.

At 01:15 or 01:20, Fort Copacabana fired its first shot, targeting the uninhabited island of Cotunduba. The shots were heard throughout the city at dawn and marked the beginning of the uprising. The second shot went in the same direction; the third, to the rock at the base of Fort Vigia, alerting the population, and the fourth, to the 3rd Infantry Regiment, as a protest against the arrest of Hermes da Fonseca. Shots were then expected from the other forts, especially from Santa Cruz and Imbuí, to mark their participation, but there was only silence.

==== Defeat of the Military School ====
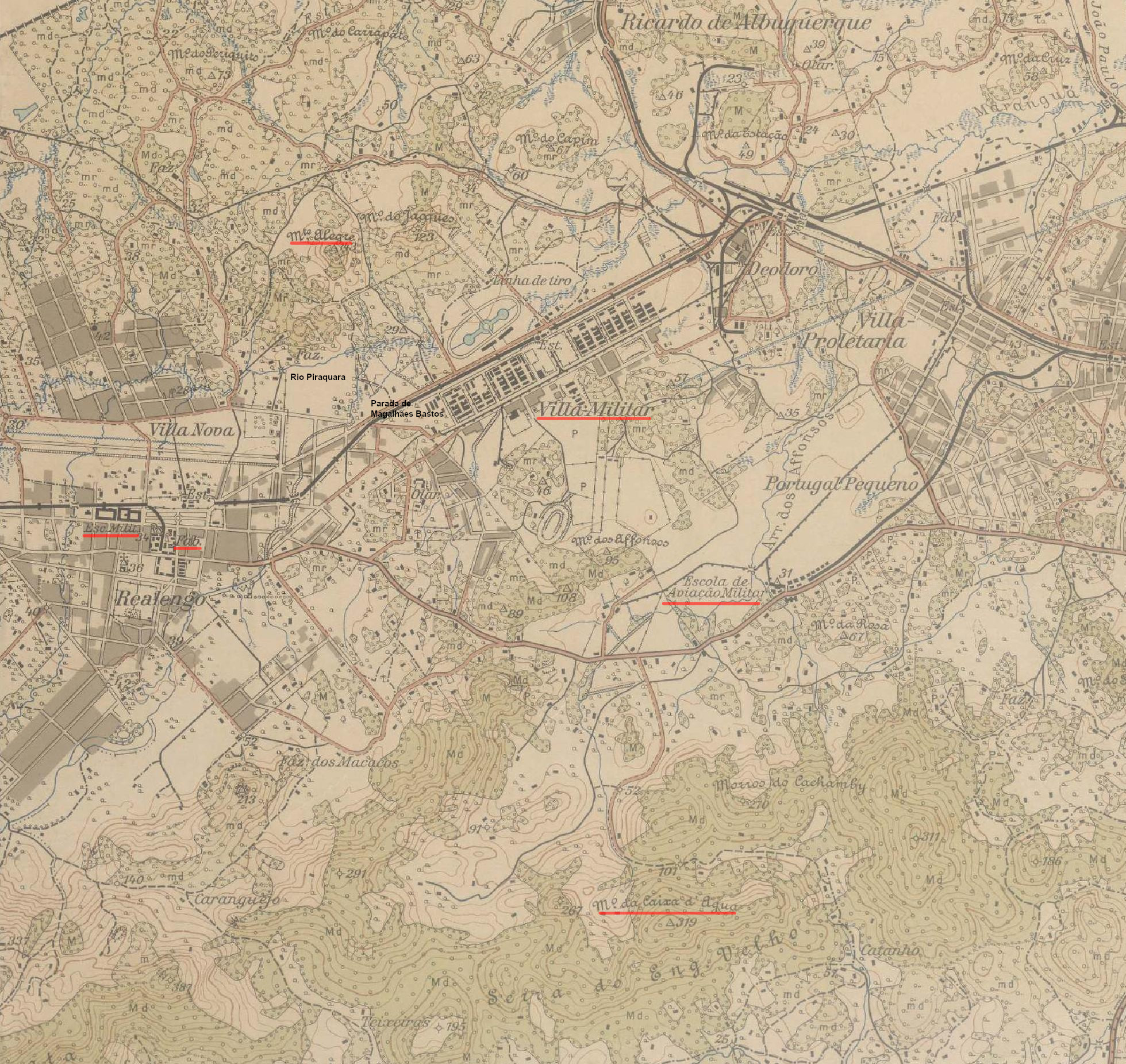
Vila Militar and its surroundings, with the Monte Alegre and Caixa D'Água hills highlighted

The Military School of Realengo had 638 students in arms. About a hundred of them stayed at the school to take care of those who did not join the revolt, while another five hundred, or 449, headed to Vila Militar under the leadership of colonel Brito. They were of the four branches, (Note: Roesler 2015, p. 139. Students were militarily organized into a Student Corps, with infantry, cavalry, artillery, and engineering subunits (Roesler 2015, p. 70).) each under its instructional assistant. The cavalry squadron went ahead along the Estrada Real de Santa Cruz to the Piraquara bridge. The journey began at midnight along the São Pedro de Alcântara road. The expected goal was to join the revolutionaries at Vila Militar, but it was hostile.

General Fernando Setembrino de Carvalho was woken up at 02:00 to take over the General Staff of the Army, to which he had been appointed a few days before. The Minister of War, as a civilian, did not command the repression of the uprising, which was the responsibility of the commander of the region. However, according to Carvalho's testimony, general Carneiro da Fontoura was "invisible", resting in his office, while confusion reigned in command, with conflicting information about the revolt. Hearing the artillery on the way, Setembrino went to Vila Militar in person, where he assumed command. Most of the 1st Division remained loyal to the government.

Loyalist reinforcements were already on the way: a squadron from the 1st Divisional Cavalry Regiment, heading towards Realengo in reconnaissance, and, towards Méier, a detachment under general João de Deus Mena Barreto, commander of the 2nd Infantry Brigade. He had the 3rd Military Police Battalion, the 3rd Machine Gun Company, under captain Daltro Filho, and other units, without withdrawing many troops from the seat of government. All of Central do Brasil was occupied: a battalion of Caçadores at Méier station, a battalion of the 2nd Infantry Regiment at Todos os Santos, and so on. To the south of Vila Militar, a police cavalry squadron guarded the Estrada Real de Santa Cruz. The Catete Palace was protected since 02:00 by a company of infantry from the Naval Battalion, and at 06:00 a company from the 3rd RI and an artillery battery garrisoned the courtyard of the Ministry of War.

The first contact was between the Realengo cavalry picket and a patrol of the 15th Independent Cavalry Regiment. At daybreak, the Realengo infantry collided with the barracks of the 1st Engineering Battalion, at the west end of Vila Militar. The revolutionaries took up positions on the Monte Alegre hill, in the locality of Árvore Seca. (Note: O Paiz, 6 July 1922. The descriptions of the first contact are diverse. In Torres 2000, ch. 10, before the Magalhães Bastos train stop, a liaison officer reported the position of the village. In Silva 1971, p. 186, a vanguard platoon "had a different reception than it expected" at the Engenharia train stop. In Doria 2016, ch. 12, the students were surprised by a volley of machine guns in the air, with some scurrying away, and the others then placing artillery. According to the narrative of a reporter from A Nação, colonel Brito's command post saw the approach of about 100 men from the Vila's infantry, but they were not harassed to verify if there was division or union between the opposing forces. When it got too close, the machine guns at the post fired into the air and the rebel infantry on the side of the hill opened fire; thus the fighting began (Silva 1971, p. 192-193).) From there they fought a duel with the 1st Horse Artillery Regiment, which had a 75mm battery near the barracks and two others on the Caixa d'Água hill. 150 men from the School of Sergeants protected the artillery in the direction of Estrada Real de Santa Cruz. The projectiles flew over the roofs of Vila Militar. (Note: O Paiz, 6 July 1922 points to the students as the first to open fire, both infantry, as they approached the barracks of the 1st Engineering Battalion, and artillery, which would have attacked Vila Militar since dawn. However, Silva 1971, Doria 2016 and Torres 2000 all point out that the students didn't fire first. According to Juarez Távora, member of the rebel column, the command left the column on the hill, with a good position over Vila Militar, and only at daybreak did it give the order to fire its artillery to check the position of the Vila, which reacted with force. (Torres 2000, ch. 10, and Roesler 2015, p. 138-139).) Captain Mascarenhas de Morais, of the 2nd Legalist Battery, reported how the rebels' artillery hit near the officers' residences, leading some families to withdraw. General Ribeiro Costa, commander of the 1st Infantry Brigade, led the response from Vila Militar. The Assault Car Company and a section of the 1st Heavy Machine Gun Company were in reserve.

At 10:00 the bitter fight had already lasted four hours. Vila Militar's artillery went from indirect to direct and barrage fire. At that time the loyalists started an enveloping movement. In the testimony of Colonel Xavier de Brito, a new element of loyalist infantry was seen heading towards the school to bypass it from the left flank. According to O Paiz, the maneuver was behind Monte Alegre, led by colonel Nestor Sezefredo, with the 1st Infantry Regiment, a battalion of the 2nd and a squadron of the 1st Divisional Cavalry Regiment as a flank guard. Colonel Brito assembled his General Staff. There was no chance of victory, and he needed to save the cadets' lives. In Cascadura, more loyalists were waiting. Thus, the revolutionaries raised the white flag and returned to the school. The arrested officers and students were released. The result was one dead and several wounded, among the rebels, and two dead and five wounded, among the loyalists. (Note: Silva 1971, p. 195-196 Among the loyalists, Hipólito José dos Santos and Júlio Evangelista da Silva died and Altino Gomes da Silva, João da Silva Rabelo, Ademar da Costa Pessoa, Cristóvão Maciel de Azevedo and Aristides Vale dos Santos were wounded.) After 12:00 or 14:00 a squadron of loyalist cavalry, under captain Euclides Figueiredo, entered the school without resistance. Later, it was replaced by a battalion from Vila Militar. Colonel Brito and the instructors and other officers were arrested.

==== Siege of Fort Copacabana ====
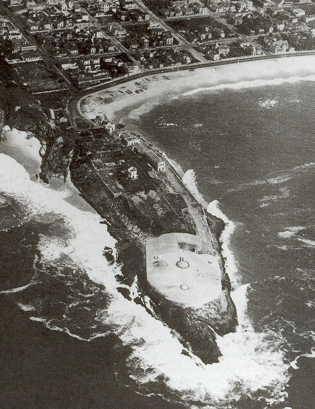
Fort Copacabana in 1920

At dawn at Fort Copacabana, the revolutionaries, at first without information, were waiting for news of their victory. Loyalist infantry remained nearby, and colonel João Nepomuceno da Costa was appointed commander of the attacking force. The infantry stayed in the Novo and Velho tunnels, and the artillery, in the mountains in the region of the tunnels in Vila Rica and Leme. The detachment consisted of a cavalry squadron (for reconnaissance and liaisons), a battalion of the 3rd Infantry Regiment and two companies, a battalion of Caçadores and two batteries, one of mountain artillery and the other of howitzers. At 14:30 colonel Nepomuceno received the order to attack. The bulk of the 3rd Infantry Battalion would advance to Cantagalo hill and block the enemy, while the other forces would attack the defenders in Ipanema and Copacabana, trying to isolate them from the fort.

The order was to attack as soon as possible, without fail before nightfall, but the detachment could only concentrate at 19:00. At the end of the morning, the commander of the fort used the 190mm Krupp cannons to fire at the left wing of the Ministry of War, in order to reach the table where the arrest order for Hermes da Fonseca had been signed. The first shot landed in front of República square, raising dust and shrapnel and causing workers and residents to flee. The second fell into the back of Light & Power company, hitting a townhouse and killing a man, a woman and two children. Minister Calógeras himself telephoned to protest the damage. Colonel Nepomuceno had orders to cut off telephone connections and the water and electricity supply, but he did not permanently cut off communications so that the rebels would know of their defeat in the rest of the city.

Without realizing it, Calógeras had indicated the target that had been hit. The gunners realized that they had forgotten to brake the gun during firing. Correcting their mistake, they fired again and hit the Ministry of War. The cannon fired twice more, hitting the courtyard and the opposite end. Two soldiers died and one was injured. Panic gripped the building. The headquarters was transferred to the Fire Department, in the same square, and then to another headquarters in Largo do Humaitá.

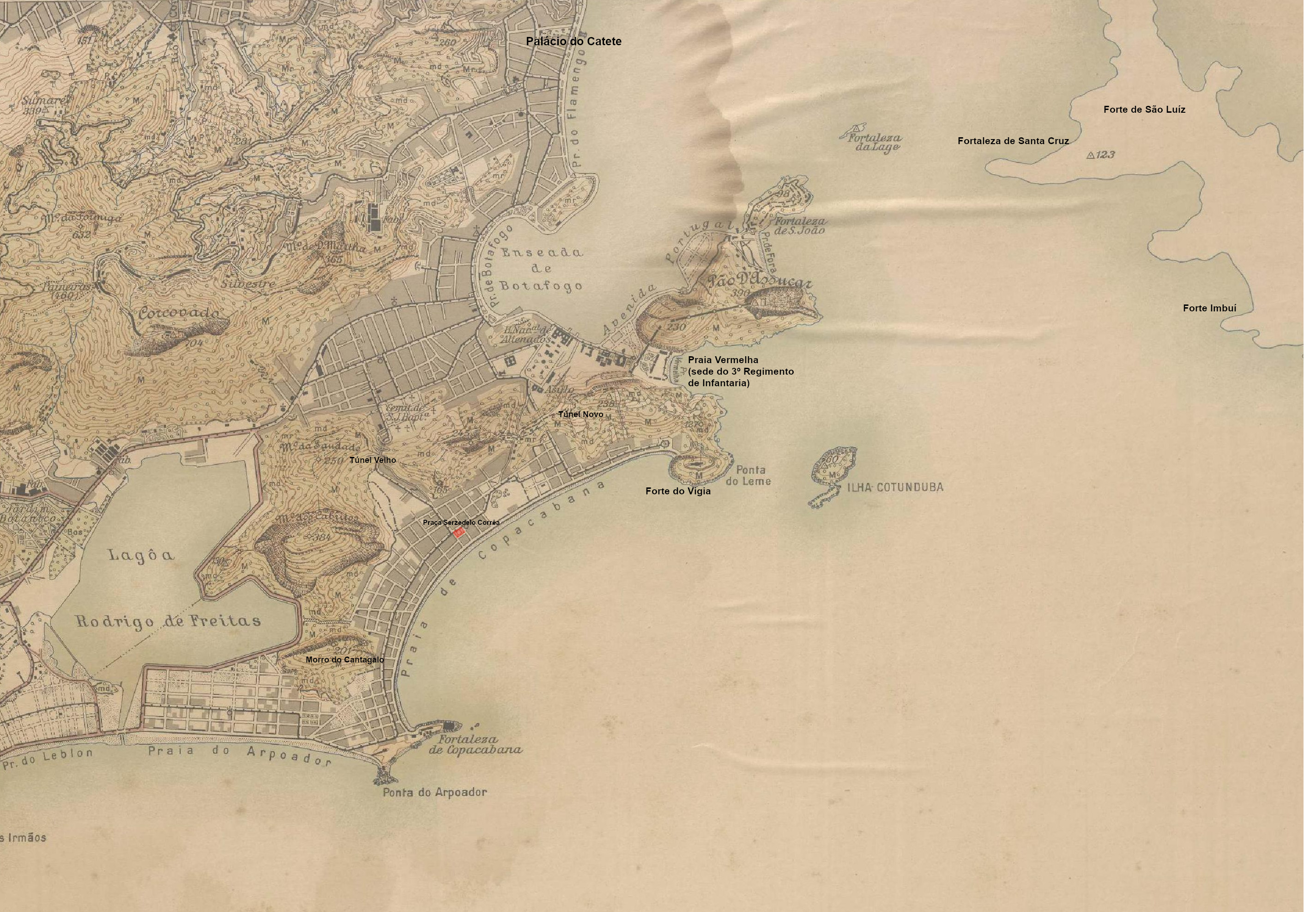
Copacabana and its surroundings

Shortly before 15:00, colonel Nepomuceno, a personal friend of commander Euclides, summoned the fort to surrender, warning of the failure of the revolt. The fort's envoy said that they would only obey marshal Hermes da Fonseca and asked for an armistice. Colonel Nepomuceno granted it, under the reasoning of gaining time for the arrival of reinforcements, but president Epitácio Pessoa, sure of his position, did not want to negotiate. While the ceasefire was in effect, at 16:00, under his orders, the Fortress of Santa Cruz opened fire. There was a "duel of the fortresses". The rebels retaliated against government troops in Copacabana; one of the three shots hit the Guinle family mansion. At 18:30, Fort Imbuí joined the fire against Copacabana. Through the intervention of general Bonifácio, whose wife was in Imbuí, captain Euclides Hermes spared the target, choosing the Naval Battalion. Fort Vigia also participated. Loyalists were slow; Imbuí fired late, as the boiler needed three to four hours to provide sufficient pressure. Fort São Luís was supposed to participate, but it didn't even get to fire. At 19:00, a new emissary from the Attack Forces Detachment warned that there would be no armistice and called for the surrender of the fort. It was a formality, as the arrival of night imposed the ceasefire.

According to Siqueira Campos, a poorly communicated withdrawal order, during the bombardment of Santa Cruz, resulted in the destruction of a French 75mm cannon used in the external defense; it was thrown into the water. For Eduardo Gomes, it was a way to prevent the cannon from falling into enemy hands. Another possible motive was to express opposition to the French Military Mission. The cannon was new and was there for testing.

Among the loyalists, the mountain artillery arrived at 20:00, and the other battery, at 21:30, positioning themselves respectively in Vila Rica and in the Leme gorge. The siege was only tightened at 23:00, with the troops reaching Serzedelo Correia square, with a patrol on the beach. In an elevated position on Toneleros street, captain Eurico Gaspar Dutra served as an observer for the artillery. A company of the 3rd Infantry Division remained at Fort Vigia, and the cavalry remained near Cantagalo Hill, guarding Leblon beach. The troops did not come closer as support from the Navy's cannons was expected.

==== Naval bombardment ====
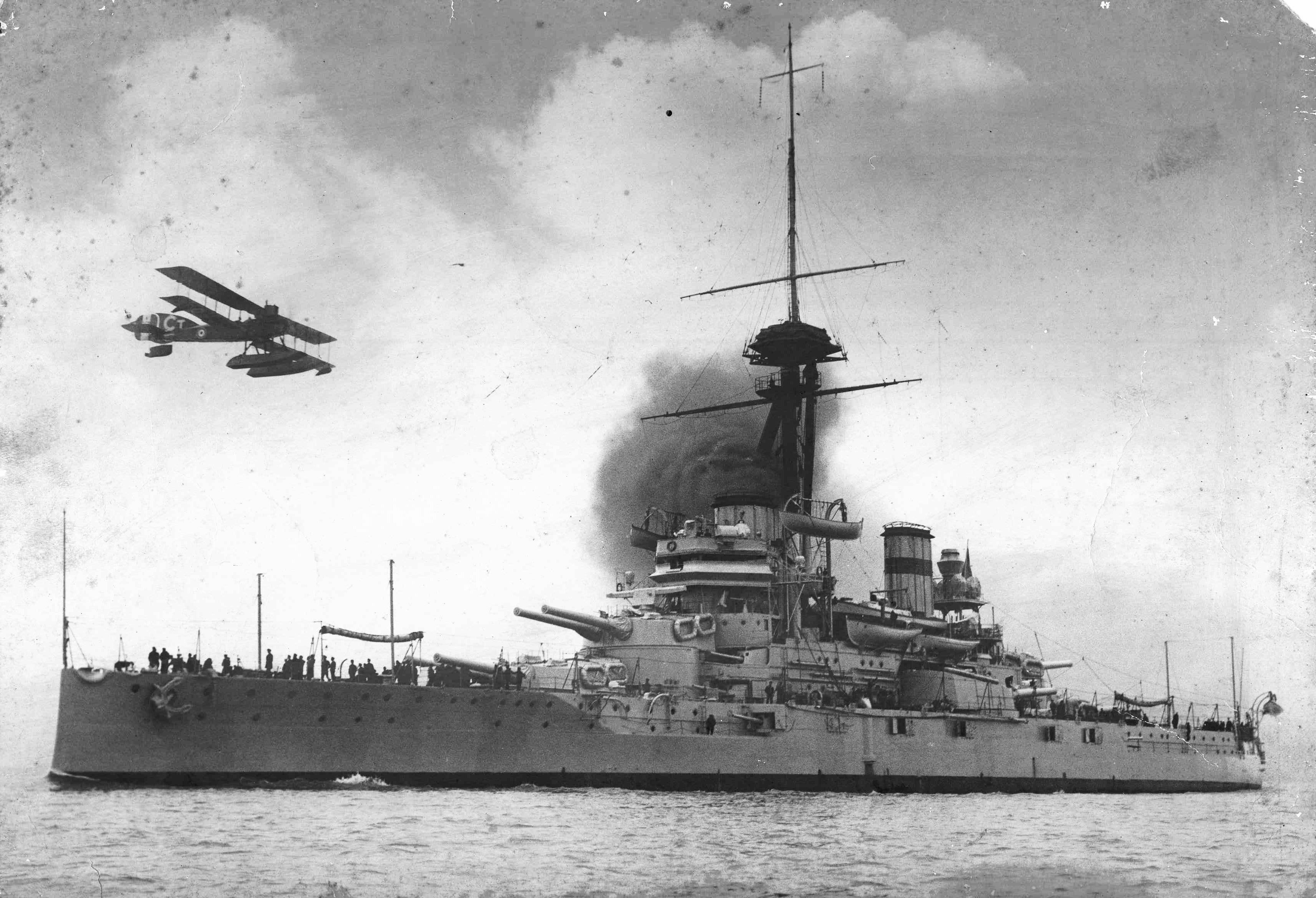
Battleship São Paulo

Inside the fort, with the supply of electricity and water being cut out, the defenders relied on candles and brackish water distilled from the sea. On 6 July, the lieutenants wanted to spare captain Euclides Hermes, the only officer with a wife and children, sending him to negotiate his surrender, but he did not want to leave. At 04:00 at night, minister Calógeras telephoned to warn the rebels of the total isolation of the fort, but gave them a guarantee of their lives. The commander gathered his officers and explained the situation. The rebels inside the fort knew of the imminent bombardment by the Navy and the other fortifications. A faction led by Siqueira Campos and Eduardo Gomes wanted to resist, but another considered the revolt over. The commander gave each the option of leaving or staying in the fort. Of the more than three hundred men in the garrison, only 29 remained — five officers (Euclides, Siqueira, Eduardo Gomes, Mário Carpenter and Newton Prado), two sergeants, a corporal, sixteen privates and five civilians. The prisoners were released.

At 07:35, the battleship São Paulo crossed the mouth of Guanabara Bay. Behind it, slightly displaced to port, came the Minas Geraes. The destroyer Paraná, with an admiral's pennant, accompanied the duo. (Note: Admiral Pedro Max Fernando de Frontin, Chief of Staff of the Navy, supervised the operation aboard Paraná. At the same time, the destroyers Pará, Piauí, Santa Catarina and Alagoas left to watch the coast (Gazeta de Notícias, 7 July 1922).) Each battleship had a main battery of twelve 305mm guns (of which a maximum of ten could be used at the same time, due to the position of the turrets), against two cannons of the same caliber at the fort. But several factors favored the revolutionaries. The fort's shells had 1,500 meters more range than the battleships, and its concrete armor, up to 12 meters thick, was much stronger than the ships' steel armor. The geography of Guanabara Bay nullified the battleships' mobility advantage, forcing them to fight at close range (less than 7,250 meters), in which even their most protected parts could be pierced by the fort's shells.

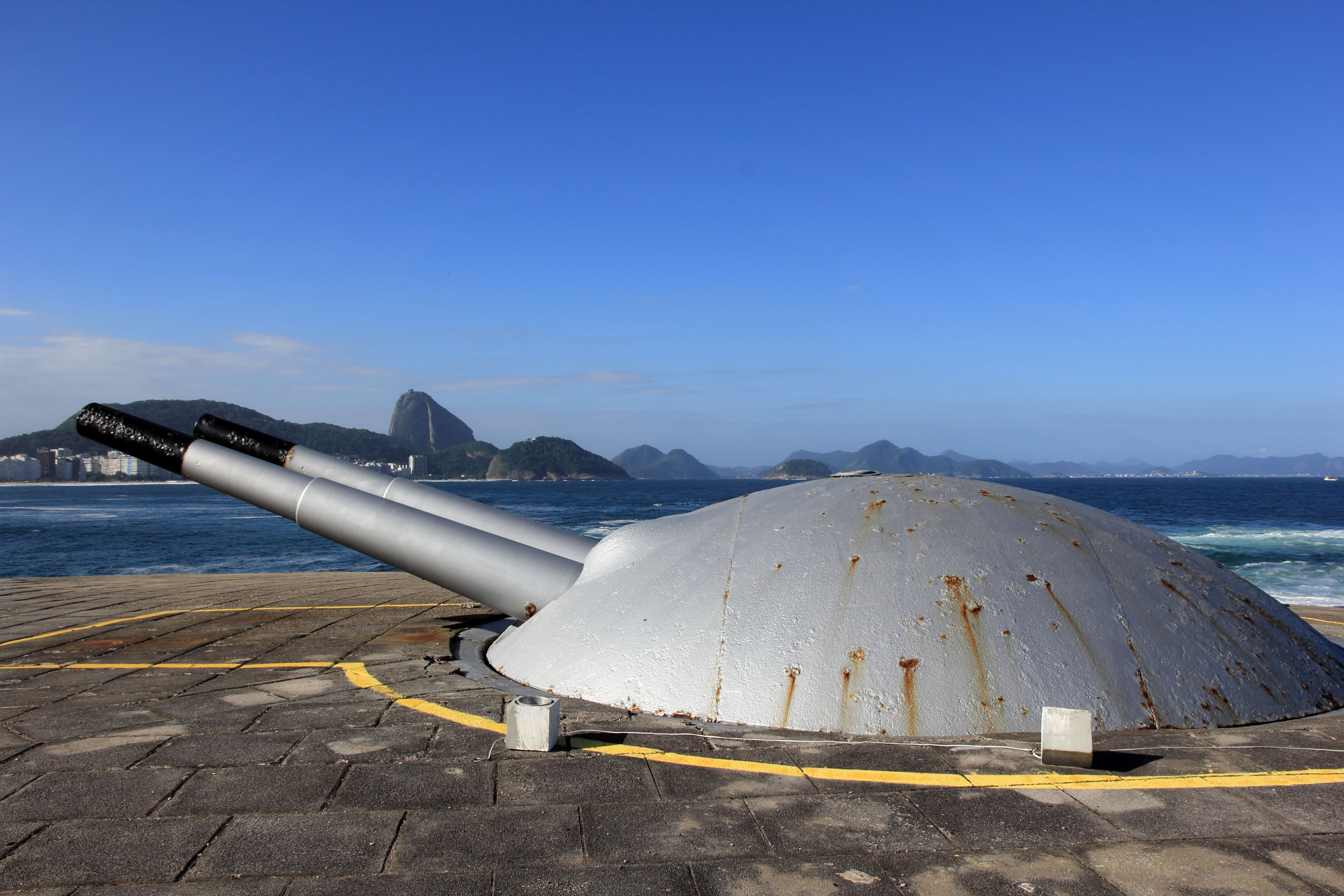

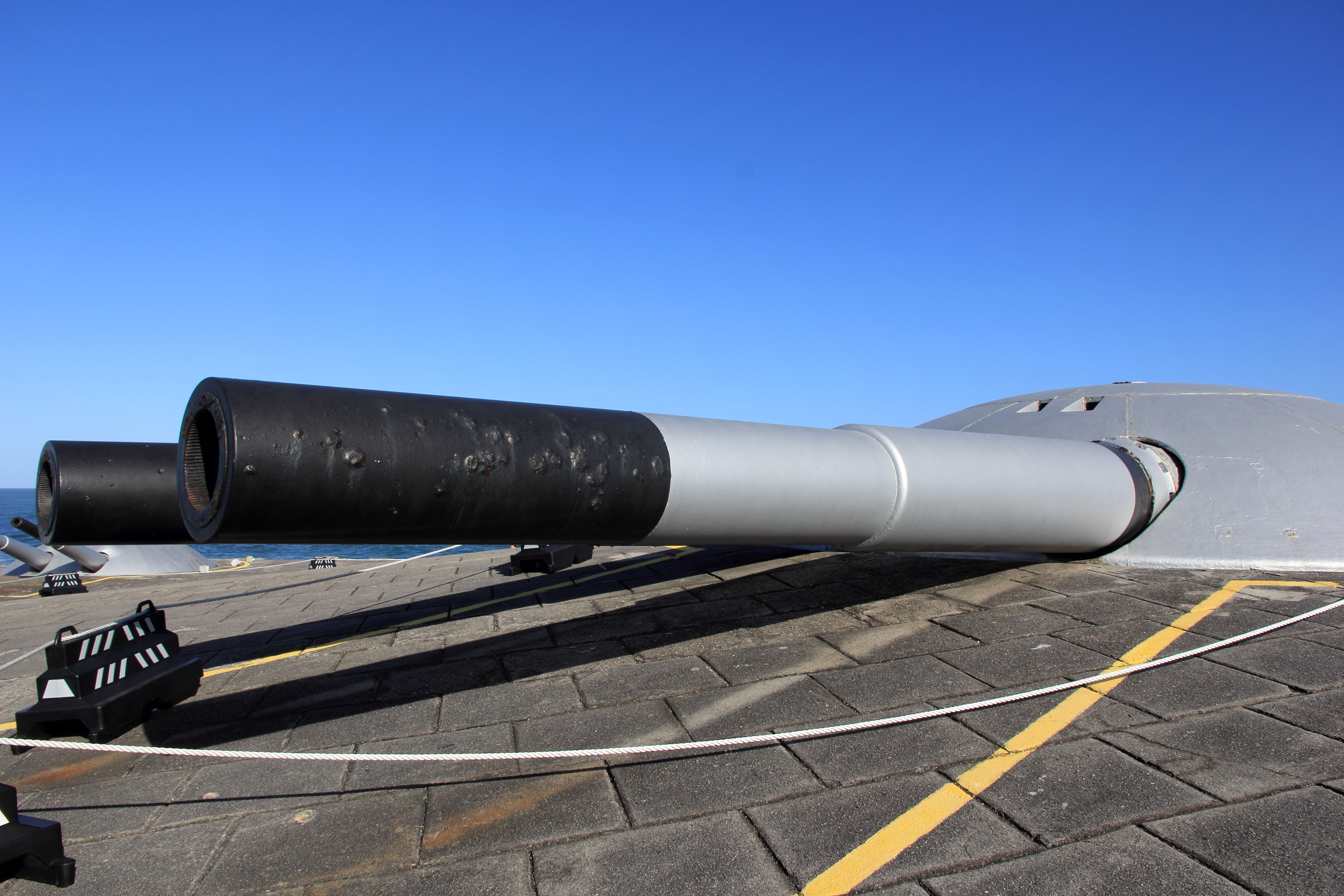
190mm and 305mm turrets at Fort Copacabana

When Siqueira Campos saw the ships, the fort's 305mm guns were too high and aimed at Vila Militar. The revolutionaries were unable to maneuver the turret as the diesel engine failed—the result of sabotage in the confusion of the retreat. The Navy was probably aware of this, and therefore risked its ships at close range. The naval task force continued on a north-south axis, along the Ilha Rasa-Ilha da Laje line. At the signal from Fort Vigia, São Paulo fired a first salvo at 08:00. Taking care not to hit Leblon, the bombardment continued for half an hour, firing 19 or 20 shells at the fort. Minas Gerais did not fire, but the bombardment was supported on land by colonel Nepomuceno's batteries.

The low fog did not allow the sailors to see the shells' impact zone. Only in the last salvo did they see smoke in the fort; according to captain Euclides, two shots finally hit. The shots did not pierce the protected area, but one of them opened a hole five feet deep. In the words of the fort's commander, "we received, inert, as simple spectators, the violent shells from the 305 pieces of São Paulo". The ship was within range of the fort's 190mm guns, but sources differ as to whether or not the fort responded to the bombardment; Navy sources do not state that São Paulo was a target. (Note: Marinha do Brasil, s/d only mentions "missing shots" from the fort. For Poggio 2008, who gave a detailed account of the naval action, it would have been logical and plausible for the revolutionaries to strike back, but this did not happen. Silva 1971, p. 120 claims that São Paulo's conning tower was hit by a 190mm shell and the navy retreated to a safe distance. Later, the inquiry resulted in the removal of the ship's captain. This does not match the testimony of Euclides Hermes, reproduced on the next page. According to O Jornal issue of 7 July, São Paulo, "according to what they claim, was hit by a shell from the fortress, which caused slight damage".)

Shortly before sighting the battleship, the revolutionaries had fired the 190mm guns at targets on land. This bombardment continued even when the navy was close. The fort fired on Ilha das Cobras, the army headquarters, Fort Vigia and the Catete Palace. On Ilha das Cobras, three marines died in the Naval Battalion barracks. As they did not find the tables with the calculations, the shot against Catete missed, destroying a nearby house.

The Minister of War again telephoned the revolutionaries to ask for a ceasefire. The fort's commander agreed, warning, however, that he still had 72 tons of ammunition and would fight back any provocation. At 09:07 the fort raised the white flag. (Note: According to Marinha do Brasil, s/d, São Paulo silenced its batteries due to the threat of revolutionaries bombing the city.) Around 10:00 two emissaries of the minister went to parliament with the rebels, but at the same time two Breguet 14 planes from the navy, which was not informed of the agreement, bombed the fort, resulting in a fight with the emissaries. Calógeras proposed a personal conversation with Euclides Hermes, but this could be a trap. Siqueira Campos defined the conditions for the rebels, who wanted free passage to leave the country. The captain left the fort and was arrested at his home.

==== March on Atlântica Avenue ====
Command of the fort was left to Siqueira Campos, and the plan was to bombard the city if the captain did not return within two hours. At 12:30, general Hastínfilo de Moura, head of the Casa Militar, telephoned to threaten the execution of Euclides Hermes if the fort fired again. Siqueira Campos managed to speak with Euclides by telephone, being informed that the Ministers of War and Navy guaranteed the life of the rebels if they left the fort and surrendered unconditionally. Siqueira put the handset on the hook and did not answer. The white flag remained flying over the fort.

Siqueira Campos proposed bombing the city and then blowing up the fort in a collective suicide. Eduardo Gomes argued against that: the bombings would kill more civilians, and the fort belonged to Brazil. The soldiers agreed. It was then decided to abandon the fort. Their names were inscribed on the wall with nails. The flag of Brazil was cut into 28 or 29 pieces, one for each member. (Note: Siqueira Campos and Eduardo Gomes mentioned about 28 men, while criminal prosecutor Carlos Costa and the testimony of "volunteer J.M.P." said it was 29. Silva 1971, p. 172. Doria 2016 says 29. Carpenter wrote on his piece of the flag: "Fort Copacabana, 6 July 1922. To my dear parents, I offer a piece of the flag in defense of which I decided to give what I could... my life. Mario Carpenter". Siqueira did the same: "To my father and my brother and to the memory of the 28 companions and the one [woman] I cannot say".Doria 2016, ch. 14.) They distributed some brandy, filled their pockets with ammunition, and left, armed with Mauser 1908 rifles and Parabellum pistols. There would be no surrender: the way out was to fight the government supporters. They were "volunteers of death".

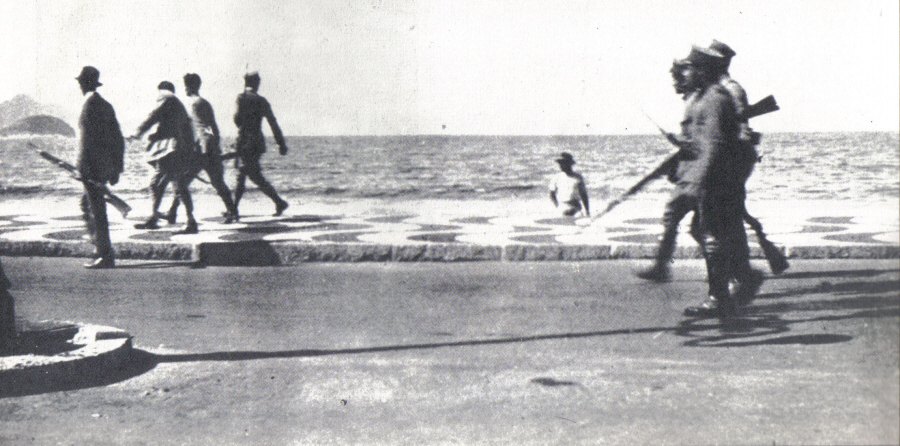
The last rebels marching on Atlântica Avenue

They left the fort in the early afternoon. (Note: Eduardo Gomes wrote down the departure at 13:15, with the combat ending at 15:00 (Silva 1971, p. 147); Hélio Silva considered this record more likely (p. 163). Colonel Tertuliano Potiguara reported that at 13:00 he heard the departure of the rebels from the fort (p. 142). Newton Prado recalled the departure at approximately 14:00 (p. 167). Siqueira Campos reported a fight from 13:45 to 15:00 (p. 166). In Gazeta de Notícias's narrative, the departure from the fort was just before 14:00 (p. 130). Doria 2016 mentions just before 14:00 as the exact moment.) By then, surrender was expected in Catete. Upon being informed by the ministers, Epitácio Pessoa ordered an attack by the Navy and the land forces and dispatched Catete's own police guard to reinforce Copacabana. Not all the 28 men left the fort, and others scattered along the way. Passersby followed as spectators. They went along Atlântica Avenue towards Túnel Novo and from there to the presidential palace. Octavio Correia, a civilian and engineer from Rio Grande do Sul, joined the rebels, receiving Newton Prado's carbine. Meanwhile, four soldiers fled. Correia already knew the commander of the fort and the lieutenants before the revolt. At the time, Atlântica Avenue was already a dual carriageway and several buildings were under construction. The gentrification of the shore was beginning, and the beach was frequented by various social classes. The revolutionaries stopped at Hotel Londres to drink water, where photographer Zenóbio Couto took the famous photographs. Siqueira Campos was left out. Two more defections followed. From afar, members of the 3rd Infantry Regiment shouted for them to surrender.

The nearby loyalist commander, captain Pedro Chrysol Fernandes Brasil, commanded the 6th Company of the 3rd Infantry Regiment (Note: As mentioned in Doria 2016 and Torres 2000. Silva 1971, p. 139, refers to him as a major and commander of the 2nd battalion, but still gives his troops as three platoons, i.e. a company, not a battalion. Shortly afterwards (p. 142), he reproduced the testimony of colonel Potiguara, who calls him captain.) and had three platoons in Serzedelo Correia Square under lieutenants João Francisco Sauwen, João de Segadas Viana and Pedro Miquelena. Upon learning of the rebels' departure, he left lieutenant Segadas Viana at Barroso Street (now Siqueira Campos Street), Miquelena at Hilário de Gouveia Street and Sauwen at the square. He acted under the orders of colonel Nepomuceno, but he lived a drama, as his son was among the rebels arrested at the Military School.

==== Final battle ====
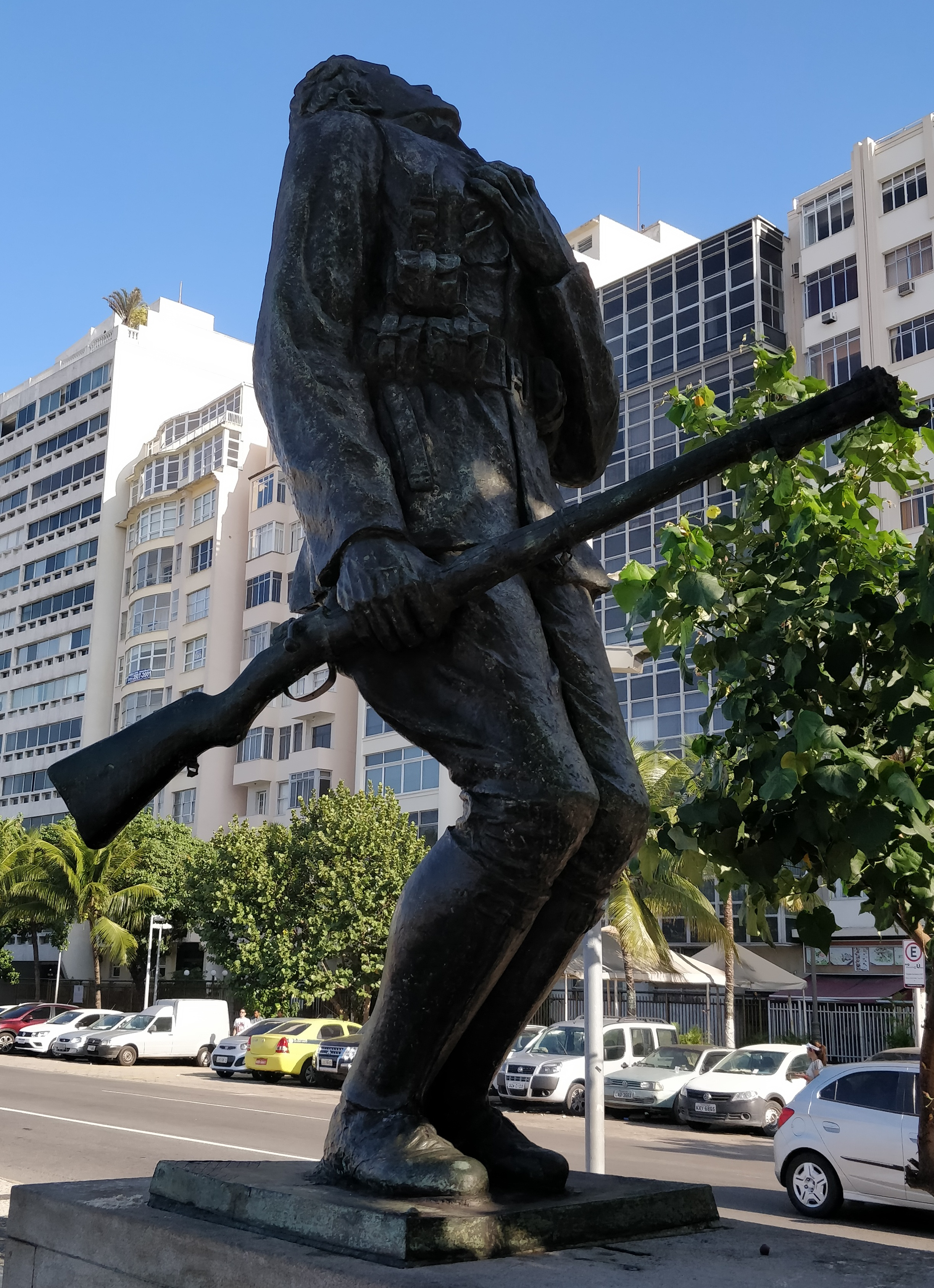
Statue representing the moment Siqueira Campos was shot

When lieutenant Segadas Viana approached the beach with his platoon to spot the rebels, he found them on the corner of Atlântica Avenue. A tense conversation ensued, pistols in hand, between him, Mário Carpenter (his colleague in the 3rd Infantry Regiment) and Siqueira Campos. Viana wanted them to surrender, and they wanted him to join them. Captain Brasil also approached. Carpenter, his subordinate, declared: "captain, we didn't come to surrender, we want to die fighting, against you. It is useless, therefore, to advise us". One of the rebels shouted: "We are going to Catete, captain". He insisted that it was madness, as they would have to face the entire regiment, and asked them to surrender, guaranteeing their life, but they threatened him personally. So he gave the order to fire and the fighting began. (Note: Torres 2000, ch. 17, Doria 2016, ch. 14 and Silva 1971, p. 139-140, the latter reproducing a record based on the captain's account. According to the captain, "even before lieutenant Segadas Viana gave his order to the platoon, the rebels divided into two groups and opened sustained fire". Doria 2016 narrates the first shot coming from a government soldier as the rebels walked away, killing soldier Pedro Ferreira de Melo.)

The first to die was a rebel soldier shot between Barroso Street and Hilário de Gouveia Street. The rebels divided into two groups and fired at the platoons of lieutenants Viana and Miquelena; Miquelena's platoon, suffering casualties, retreated to Serzedelo Correia square, linking up with Sauwen's. The platoon at the rear moved ahead in reinforcement. The avenue was under construction, and the rebels found shelter in the gap between the sand and the sidewalk. The government supporters, in turn, also climbed trees and roofs to shoot. With their rifles and machine guns, "it seemed to rain in the sea given the constant spray". The rebels, on the other hand, saved ammunition. The 9th Company of the 3rd Infantry Regiment, led by captain Floriano Gomes da Cruz, went to the rear of the rebels. Captain Brasil called for reinforcements and ammunition.

One by one the rebels were shot. Captain Brasil had orders to finish them off with a bayonet charge, but he ignored it, hoping his enemies would cease fire and survive. The job fell to colonel Tertuliano Potiguara, with about 100 men from the Military Police and the 3rd Infantry Regiment, coming from the presidential guard. "The charge order was given, and the last elements of the Copacabana garrison were broken". In the end, Potiguara's men cried out: "Lift up the living! Let the living rise!" The dead and wounded were collected on the beach. The 3rd Infantry Regiment company proceeded to Fort Copacabana, where they arrested, without resistance, eight soldiers and about 15 civilians.

==== Casualties in Copacabana ====
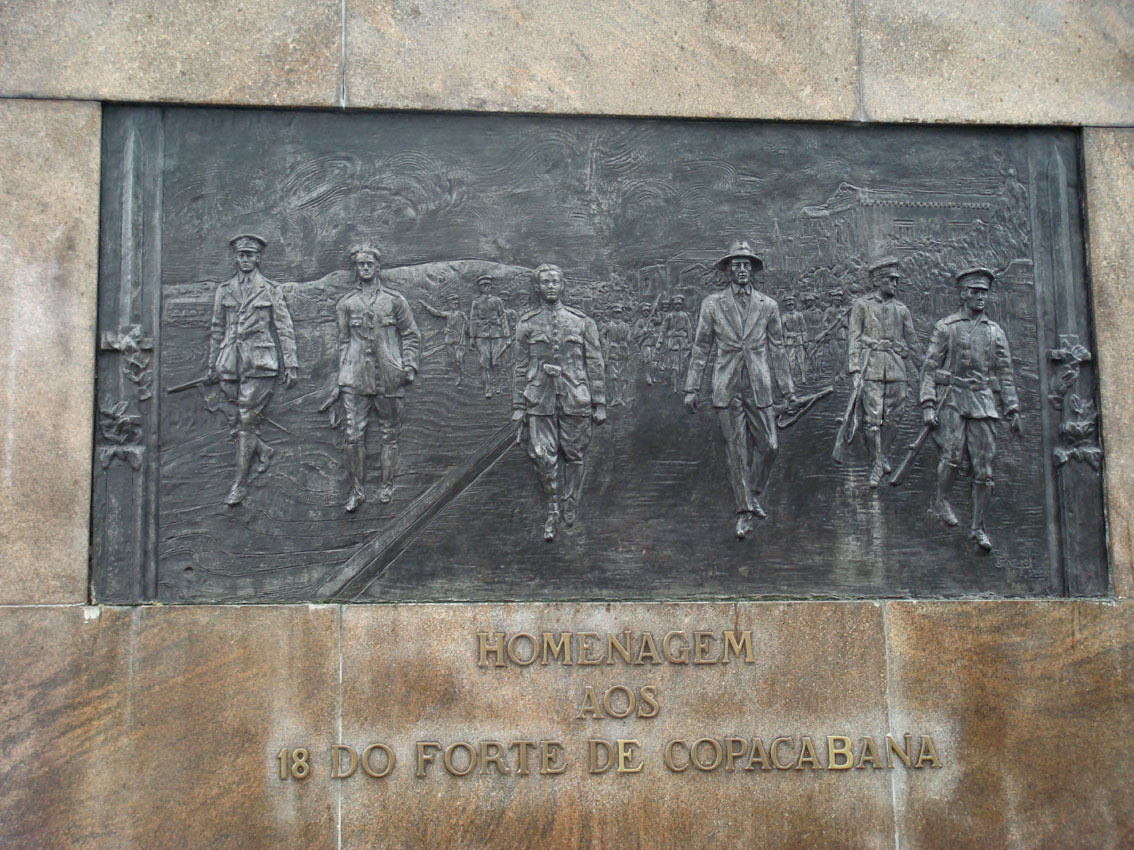
Plaque in homage to the "18" in Rio de Janeiro

The number of those rescued may have exceeded 80, including a team from Brasília Filmes that tried to film the revolt; the driver was killed in the shootout and the operator and bookkeeper were wounded. Epitácio Pessoa visited the revolutionaries in the hospital. Among the government supporters, colonel Potiguara reported six deaths, with several more injured, before the bayonet charge. In this charge, a sergeant was killed by Siqueira Campos, who was shot while stabbing his liver with his bayonet. (Note: Donato 1987, p. 437. Torres 2000 also mentions another attacker killed by Newton Prado, which is not mentioned in other sources.) Historian Glauco Carneiro counted 33 government supporters dead or wounded. (Note: The statement was made in 1964 to the magazine O Cruzeiro, and repeated in Carneiro 1965, p. 236. Donato 1987, p. 437 repeats the number, without giving the source.) Gazeta de Notícias reported 14 rebels dead, in addition to 5 wounded. Among the loyalists, still with uncertainty, there might have been 10 dead and 4 wounded. Correio da Manhã reported 30 wounded, between both forces, 13 privates, an "inferior" (probably a sergeant) and Mário Carpenter; at this point Newton Prado had not yet died. Another source gives 6 dead and 20 wounded among government forces in Copacabana.

The number of rebels in combat was given as 18 (3 officers and 15 soldiers) the following morning by Gazeta de Notícias. The newspaper was the first to use this number, which became mythical, being soon exalted in verse and prose. In Hélio Silva's words, "in a cold and rigorous calculation, that number that history has kept as a symbol, is not reached". There were several desertions along the way, and not all of them were recorded. The testimonies contradict each other.

Eduardo Gomes remembered that Siqueira Campos identified 10 fighters, and personally mentioned four officers and about 20 enlisted men. Newton Prado reported two officers and 14 soldiers, omitting Carpenter and Eduardo Gomes, which would add up to 18. Captain Pedro Brasil gave a much higher estimate of approximately 60 rebels. The photograph, which excludes Siqueira Campos, depicts the other three officers, Otávio Correia and two soldiers in the foreground, with five or six indistinct figures behind.

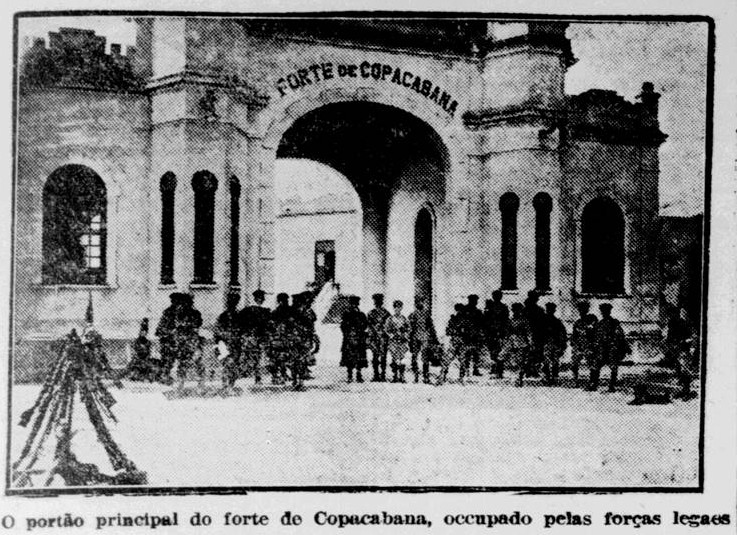
Occupation of the Fort by Loyalists after the final combat

From the 28 men who remained in the fort, plus Octavio Correia, Hélio Silva listed ten, nine military and one civilian, in the shooting, including two unknown soldiers, a black and a white one. A soldier and a civilian accompanied the march but disbanded, being arrested far from the combat site. The two strangers died. Siqueira Campos, Eduardo Gomes, Otávio Correia, Mário Carpenter, Newton Prado and José Pinto de Oliveira were taken to the hospital wounded, where only the first two survived. Two soldiers (Hildebrando da Silva Nunes and Manoel Antônio dos Reis) "were discharged from the hospital, sued and arrested, but they did not last long".

This enumeration includes the black soldier Pedro Ferreira de Melo, present in the photograph, as absent from the lists of dead, wounded and arrested, but he was the first of those killed. Another soldier included in this category by Hélio Silva, Manoel Antonio dos Santos, testified to O Cruzeiro magazine 42 years later, declaring that he had fought on the beach alongside ten other men. He allegedly escaped from the beach and was arrested the next day. (Note: There is also the testimony of volunteer "J.M.P." (Joaquim Maria Pereira Júnior, according to Torres 2000), with a number of ten in the final combat. However, his initials do not match those of any of the 28 names that remained in the fort. Hélio Silva considered that it may have been a way of remaining anonymous, when there was still political persecution, but several aspects of the testimony are implausible (Silva 1971, p. 172))

Fate of the 28 soldiers that remained in the Fort
Occupation	Name	Fate
1st lieutenants	Antônio de Siqueira Campos	Wounded and arrested
1st lieutenants	Eduardo Gomes	Wounded and arrested
2nd lieutenants	Newton Prado	Killed
2nd lieutenants	Mário Tamarindo Carpenter	Killed
1st electrician mechanic	José Pinto de Oliveira	Killed
Mechanic assistant	Artur Pereira da Silva	Not included in the list of dead, wounded and arrested
Corporal	Raimundo de Lima Cruz	Stayed in the fort
Soldiers	José Joaquim da Costa	Stayed in the fort
Soldiers	Benedito José do Nascimento	Arrested
Soldiers	Heitor Ventura da Silva	Arrested
Soldiers	Francisco Ribeiro de Freitas	Arrested far from the place
Soldiers	Hildebrando da Silva Nunes	Wounded and arrested, he was discharged from hospital but died soon after
Soldiers	Manoel Antônio dos Reis	Wounded and arrested, he was discharged from hospital but died soon after
Soldiers	Antônio Camilo de Freitas	Not included in the list of dead, wounded and arrested
Soldiers	José Rodrigues da Silva	Not included in the list of dead, wounded and arrested
Soldiers	José Olímpio de Oliveira	Not included in the list of dead, wounded and arrested
Soldiers	Manoel Ananias dos Santos (Note: Ananias dos Santos gave a statement about his participation in the final combat (Carneiro 1965), as previously discussed.)	Not included in the list of dead, wounded and arrested
Soldiers	Pedro Ferreira de Melo (Note: Included by Hélio Silva, but counted as dead in other sources, as previously discussed.)	Not included in the list of dead, wounded and arrested
Soldiers	Marcelo Miranda	Not included in the list of dead, wounded and arrested
Soldiers	José Rodrigues Marmeleiro	Not included in the list of dead, wounded and arrested
Soldiers	Rosendo Cardoso	Not included in the list of dead, wounded and arrested
Soldiers	Alberto Alves da Cunha Machado	Not included in the list of dead, wounded and arrested
Soldiers	Sandoval Alexandre Vicente	Not included in the list of dead, wounded and arrested
Civilians	Lourival Moreira da Silva	Arrested far from the place
Civilians	João Antônio Falcão de Melo	Not included in the list of dead, wounded and arrested
Civilians	Antônio Luciano da Silva	Not included in the list of dead, wounded and arrested
Civilians	Manoel Felipe da Costa	Not included in the list of dead, wounded and arrested
Civilians	Joaquim M. Pereira Júnior	Not included in the list of dead, wounded and arrested

=== Niterói ===
On the other side of Guanabara Bay, on the night of 4 to 5 July, the rebellion was led by the commander of the Navy, Álvaro de Vasconcelos. With the support of state police chief César Sampaio Leite and a group of revolutionary civilians, including deputy José Eduardo de Macedo Soares, they occupied federal and state offices including the Telephone Company, preventing communication with Rio de Janeiro. The rebellion was quelled after the Rio de Janeiro police chief imposed his authority on the local police chief.

=== Mato Grosso ===
==== Uprising in the south ====
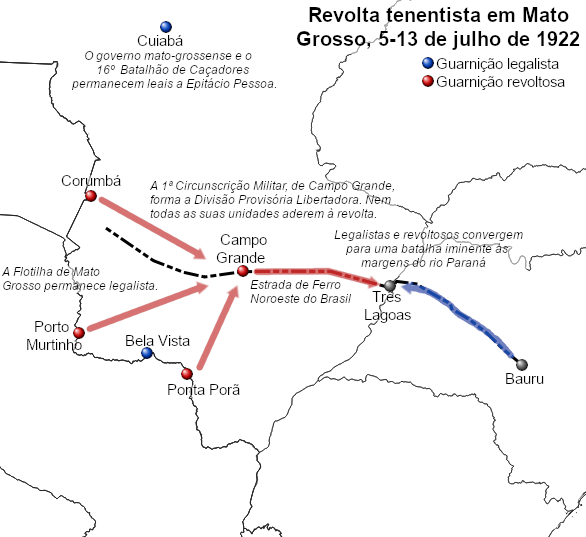
Map of the revolt in Mato Grosso

In Mato Grosso, general Joaquim Ignacio, commander of the 1st Military Circumscription, took part in the conspiracies against the government in Campo Grande, for which reason he was dismissed on 30 March. The military in that state participated in several other revolts and coronelist conflicts in the first decades of the Brazilian Republic. The new commander, Clodoaldo da Fonseca, was a relative of Hermes da Fonseca. When he took office, on 5 July, he found an already revolutionary environment. At night, meeting with his officers, he reported the revolution and claimed that it had the support of the majority of the army. They decided to rise up and issue a proclamation. Clodoaldo's leadership was symbolic, as the initiative actually rested with the lieutenants. Mato Grosso officers were unaware of the revolt's failure in Rio de Janeiro, as the telegraph and railway lines were interrupted. Clodoaldo was already aware of this, but he went ahead with the revolt for fear of a rebellion by his commanders or because of the commitment he had made before his departure to Mato Grosso.

The revolutionaries followed pre-planning, occupying public buildings and calling up reservists. In Corumbá, the military quartermaster's office was broken into to provide weapons and uniforms for the conscripts, but the effort to form another battalion of Caçadores was unsuccessful. Revolutionary authorities promised peace and maintenance of state civil servants, but in several places they overthrew civilian authorities and looted tax collection and money-issuing bodies. Civilian support was limited, existing among supporters of the Republican Reaction. In Porto Murtinho it was stronger, but martial law was applied. The rebellion had the aspect of a barracks revolt, without popular enthusiasm.

To the north, in Cuiabá, the state government of Pedro Celestino Corrêa da Costa remained loyal to Epitácio Pessoa. In the 16th Battalion of Caçadores, headquartered in the city, the commander delayed the orders of the Minister of War to hand over his battalion to the state command, but he was replaced and the battalion was outside the authority of Clodoaldo da Fonseca. The 10th Independent Cavalry Regiment (RCI), from Bela Vista, also did not participate. It was divided and its commander was against the revolt. The monitor Pernambuco, from the Mato Grosso Flotilla, went to Ladário to help fight the revolt. The Minister of War praised the loyalty of the employees of the Postal and Telegraph Company and of the Northwest Brazil Railroad. They emptied the railroad's water tanks to slow down the journey and passed on the telegraph communications to the loyalists, who were able to decipher the revolutionary plan.

==== Confrontation on the Paraná River ====
The 1st Military Circumscription constituted the Provisional Liberating Division, organized into two brigades, receiving units from Campo Grande, Porto Murtinho and Ponta Porã. The main one was the 17th Battalion of Caçadores, under the interim command of lieutenant Joaquim Távora. (Note: According to Souza 2018, p. 102, in 1921 the Military Circumscription had the same command as the Mixed Brigade. Campo Grande had the 18th BC and a Mixed Artillery Regiment, Ponta Porã the 11th RC, Corumbá the 17th BC. Appendix C (p. 427) has an extensive list of the units in the 1st Military Circumscription.) It is difficult to quantify the number of troops, but it was probably between 800 and 1,000 men. The plan was to concentrate forces in Três Lagoas, cross the Paraná River, enter São Paulo through Araçatuba and face the forces from São Paulo and allies in support of the lieutenants in Rio de Janeiro. The first train only left Campo Grande on 8 July. Upon arriving at Três Lagoas, they discovered that railway officials had removed the ferry from trains and other ships, leaving them on the other side and without essential parts. Even so, the revolutionaries seized a barge for 25 to 30 men, built another and captured a boat. They positioned four Krupp caliber 8 cannons, taken from Fort Coimbra, at the mouth of the Sucuriú River, pointing to the São Paulo side. (Note: Coimbra's artillery was the 5th Coastal Artillery Group. Souza 2018, p. 102.)

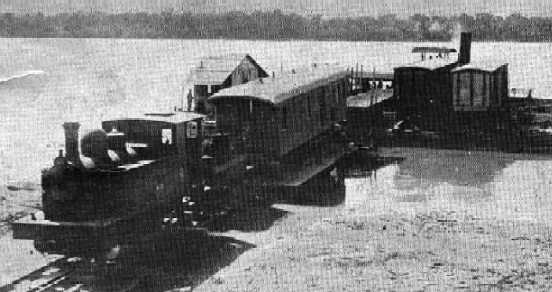
Railway ferry on the Paraná River

On 10 July, colonel Tertuliano Potiguara was tasked with crushing the uprising. President Epitácio Pessoa dismissed Clodoaldo da Fonseca on 12 July. Forces from the 2nd Military Region (including the 4th Battalion of Caçadores) and the Public Force of São Paulo moved to the Paraná River, on the border of Mato Grosso. A squadron of three planes did the reconnaissance. The Public Force contingent included 255 soldiers and 21 officers from its 2nd Infantry Battalion reinforcing colonel Potiguara, while the 4th Battalion, with 617 men, remained in reserve in Bauru. (Note: Moraes 2000, p. 60. Before that, it had already sent, on 5 July, the 1st Infantry Battalion to Itararé, on the border with Paraná, reinforced on 11 July by elements of the 3rd Battalion.) The loyalist forces concentrated near Três Lagoas, on the São Paulo side. A veteran of World War I, colonel Potiguara prepared to cross the Paraná River under the cover of his artillery and machine guns.

The fight never took place. On 13 July, general Alberto Cardoso de Aguiar conferred with Clodoaldo da Fonseca at the Três Lagoas railway station, convincing him to surrender unconditionally to avoid bloodshed. Some of the most extreme revolutionaries still wanted to fight, but Clodoaldo gave up command and was arrested. The new commander, general Cardoso de Aguiar, returned the units to their headquarters. Mato Grosso reservists, with the exception of those in the 16th Battalion of Caçadores, were disbanded.

== Political consequences ==
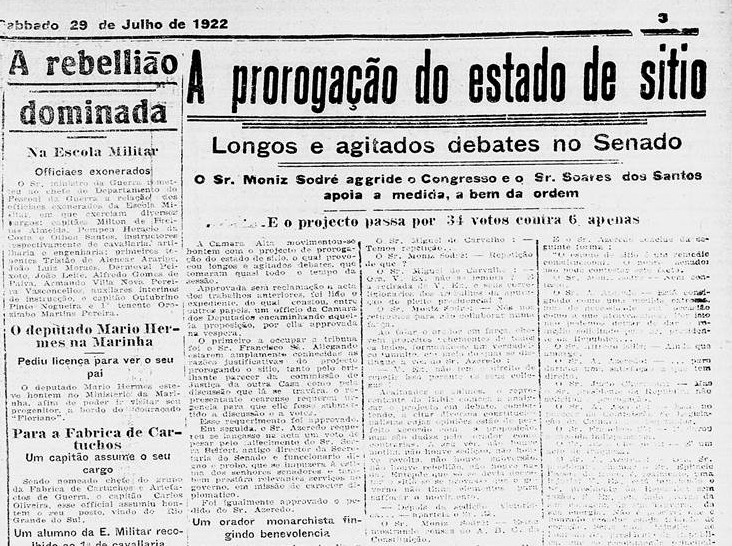
The "long and heated debates in the Senate" regarding the extension of the state of emergency on 29 July

On 5 July, with the explosions hundreds of meters away, Congress accepted the request for a state of emergency sent by president Epitácio Pessoa. The lieutenant revolt affronted the entire political class. In addition to arresting the rebels, the state of emergency was also used to persecute opposition journalists, such as Edmundo Bittencourt, owner of Correio da Manhã, which had published the fake letters. Some Rio de Janeiro state deputies were detained. Anarchist and communist workers' leaders were also persecuted. The state of emergency was extended until the end of the year, already entering the next presidential term. Newspapers sympathetic to the revolutionaries were censored.

Artur Bernardes assumed office as president in November with his authority shaken and contested and tried to consolidate his position. In his inaugural speech he made it clear that he would not accept changing the system from the outside in and promised not to act with rancor, but soon after he destroyed his opponents in the Republican Reaction. His focus was to pacify Pernambuco and dominate the dissident states (Bahia, Rio de Janeiro and Rio Grande do Sul). Continued political tension led to the expansion of the government's repressive apparatus. The government of Artur Bernardes was authoritarian, with a state of emergency in force for the most part of it and great demand for the activity of the political police. In his first month in office, Bernardes reorganized the Federal District police, creating the 4th Auxiliary Police Bureau.

When he took office, the Republican Reaction was already diluted and the dissident oligarchies were looking for peace with the government. In Rio de Janeiro, the results of the gubernatorial election, in July 1922, and for the Legislative Assembly, in December, had been disputed between the supporters of Nilo Peçanha and the opposition, leading to the formation of two assemblies. The conflict served as a pretext for federal intervention in the state in 1923. The oppositionist Feliciano Sodré was elected without resistance in a new election. In Bahia, a conciliation candidate, Góis Calmon, was elected in December 1923 and his inauguration was guaranteed by the state of emergency and federal military presence. In Rio Grande do Sul, the Revolution of 1923 broke out against the government of Borges de Medeiros. Artur Bernardes increased his authority by mediating the Pact of Pedras Altas, in which governor Borges de Medeiros would not be entitled to re-election.

Despite being opposed to the military uprising, Nilo Peçanha renounced his parliamentary immunity in order to be able to answer for what had happened, thus gaining the sympathy of public opinion. He assumed the legal defense of the rebels, remaining, in the view of the tenentists, as the civilian leader of a hypothetical provisional government until his death in 1924. Borges de Medeiros also condemned the revolt.

The revolt in 1922 was just the inauguration of a phase of military insurrections that would last until 1930. The government did not pacify the barracks. Lieutenant revolts would continue in 1924, 1925 and 1926, such as the 1924 São Paulo Revolt and the Prestes Column, but none of them managed to remove the president. Tenentism became one of the foci of opposition to the political environment of the First Brazilian Republic. In 1924, the lieutenants became more politically aware, and their own identity emerged. Tenentism represented middle-class concerns against the coffee oligarchies and their allies, advocating for a moralization of politics imposed from the top down, with a strong central government, contrary to regionalism and corruption.

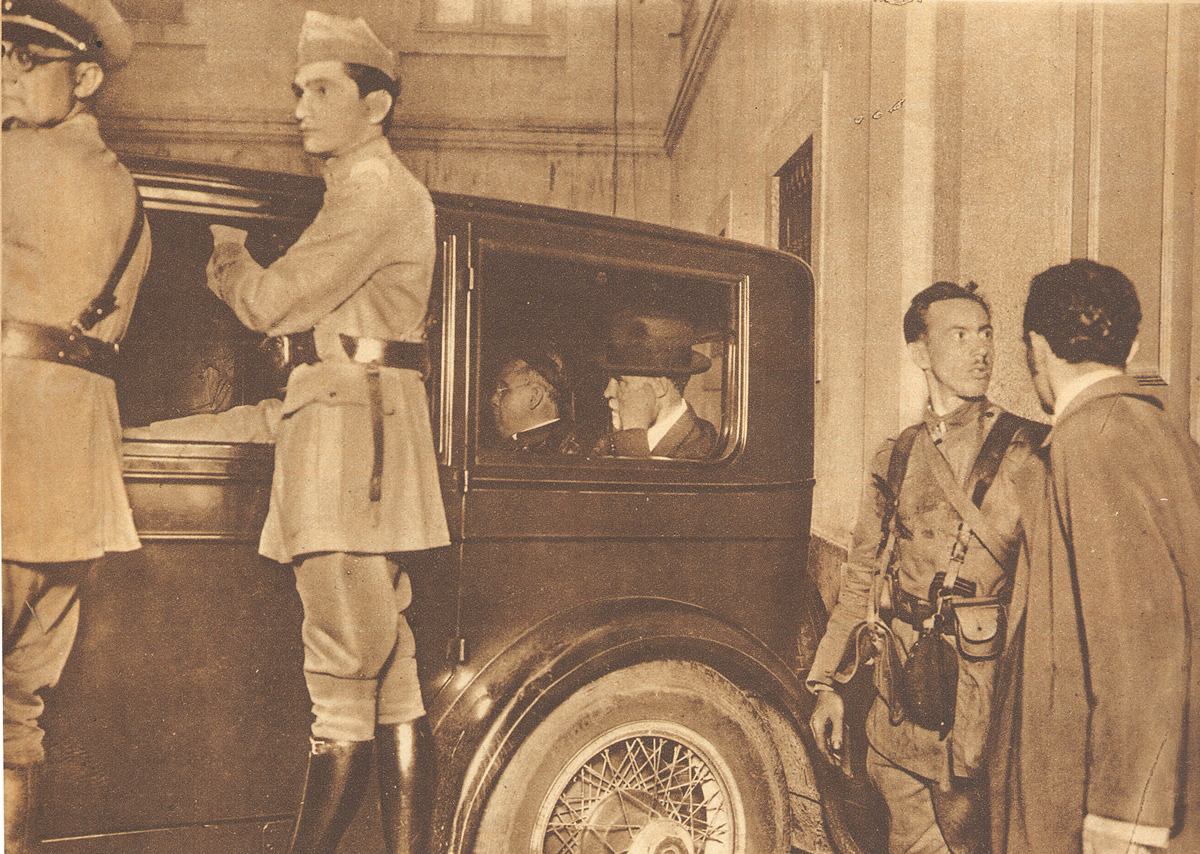
Washington Luís, the last president of the First Brazilian Republic, leaving the Guanabara Palace after being deposed by the army in 1930

In the 1930 presidential election there was a new split between the regional elites, with the opposition forming the Liberal Alliance. Former enemies of the lieutenants, including Epitácio Pessoa and Artur Bernardes, joined them in this alliance. In the campaign, the opposition resorted to mass events. Both sides practiced fraud in the election, resulting in a government victory with the election of Júlio Prestes. The opposition did not accept the results, leading to the deposition of president Washington Luís in the Revolution of 1930 and the end of the First Republic.

== Trial of those involved ==
The officers involved in Mato Grosso were sent to São Paulo from July to September to respond to inquiries, but some managed to escape to Bolivia and Paraguay. The students of the Military School of Realengo remained there, due to their large number, and an investigation was opened. They signed lists about their participation in the uprising. 588 confessed to their conscious participation, 4 said they were compelled by colleagues and officials and 18 said they were forced to participate by others. 584 students were dismissed from the school. In 1923, it looked almost empty. Instructing officers were also punished. The "Missão Indígena" came to an end, with the Minister of War lamenting the setback in the soldier's discipline caused by it. Even the commander of the school was dismissed, because, despite having been against the revolt, he was accused by the criminal prosecutor of not having responded with energy. The French Mission began to guide the training of students. The 588 students who rebelled were not reinstated.

At the end of Epitácio Pessoa's term, at least 118 officers and enlisted men remained in prison. The trial process was rigorous and arbitrary. Some were released for lack of evidence or proof of innocence, and others were granted habeas corpus to respond in freedom. The leaders of the revolt were transferred between numerous prisons over the next few years. There was the expectation of amnesty; it was common in the army, having been applied to rebels in the civil war of the 1890s and the Military School of Praia Vermelha in 1897 and 1904. This had facilitated the disposition of the rebels in 1922. Epitácio Pessoa and Setembrino de Carvalho (appointed by Artur Bernardes to the Ministry of War) advised amnesty for the new president.

Instead, in December 1923 the first sentence was the conviction, under Article 107 of the Brazilian Criminal Code, of the violent attempt to overthrow the Constitution and the form of government. As the prison sentence exceeded two years, they could not be reinstated in the army. The hope of the revolutionaries had been Article 111 (coercion to the free exercise of constituted authority), with a lesser penalty. While they were tried by civilian courts, military courts arrested them for desertion. The change in tradition was logical, as amnesties ended up subverting discipline, but applied at that time, it only increased tensions, stimulating the 1924 revolts. Among those expelled from the army and convicted, a group emerged in solidarity with each other and engaged in the conspiracy.

Soon after the 1930 Revolution, president Getúlio Vargas granted amnesty to all revolutionary lieutenants. They were reinstated in the army and many occupied prominent positions in politics in the following decades.

== Legacy ==
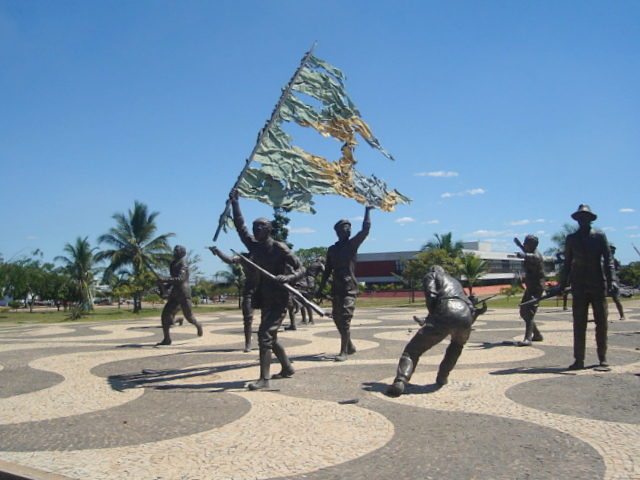
Monument to the 18 of Fort Copacabana in Girassóis Square, Palmas, Tocantins

The suicidal outcome of the revolt in Copacabana, and not the "uprising inspired by an indecisive Hermes da Fonseca", became mythical, generating martyrs and an image of heroism that fed the idealism of the following rebellions. The myth generated was more important than the actual impact of the revolt. Sociologically, it can be interpreted in terms of honor, romanticism, and virility. The lieutenants were young, idealistic, frustrated by not having fought in the First World War and attracted to the idea of sacrifice for the nation.

The date of 5 July acquired symbolic value. The conspirators of the São Paulo Revolt of 1924 had chosen several earlier start dates, going back to 28 March, but had repeatedly changed them due to unforeseen circumstances. Under increasing pressure from the authorities, in late June they chose the anniversary of the 1922 uprising as their starting date. In the deposition of Washington Luís in 1930, he was imprisoned in Fort Copacabana. The responsible generals did not clarify in their memoirs whether the symbolism and irony were deliberate.

In the 1964 coup d'état, the Coastal Artillery HQ, next to the fort, was taken over by a group of 21 officers. The press erroneously reported the "taking of the fort", which had joined on its own before the event and did not participate in the attack. The magazine O Cruzeiro called the attackers "the 40 of the fort".

In 1927, with the Prestes Column still in operation, deputy Maurício de Lacerda proposed a bronze monument to the "18 of the fort", but the Chamber of Deputies did not accept it. At the time, army authorities considered Siqueira Campos to be a criminal. He died in 1930. The other surviving lieutenant from Copacabana beach, Eduardo Gomes, had a long and distinguished career, becoming a presidential candidate in 1945; at the time, his participation in 1922 was seen as a point of prestige. The "18" received several tributes. In 1931, Barroso Street was renamed in honor of Siqueira Campos. In 1968, Newton Prado was buried in a monumental tomb in his hometown of Leme, after receiving honors. The revolt was reenacted in 1976, and the army currently celebrates the memory of both revolutionaries and loyalists such as Setembrino de Carvalho and Tertuliano Potiguara. Fort Copacabana is no longer used for defense purposes, but is integrated into the Army's Historical Museum, which favors the preservation of the memory of the event. In Palmas, Tocantins, a monument with sculptures of "the 18" was inaugurated in 2001.
