= Antônio de Siqueira Campos =

Brazilian revolutionary

Siqueira Campos
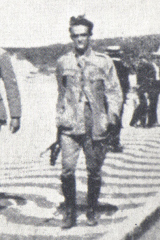
- Siqueira Campos on Copacabana Beach on 6 July 1922
- Born: 18 May 1898. Rio Claro, São Paulo, Brazil
- Died: 10 May 1930 (aged 31); Río de la Plata
- Burial place: Cemitério da Consolação, São Paulo
- Occupations: Soldier and revolutionary
- Known for: Participation in events leading up to the Revolution of 1930

Antônio de Siqueira Campos (18 May 1898 – 10 May 1930) was a leader and one of two survivors of a military revolt that occurred in July 1922 on Copacabana Beach in Rio de Janeiro, Brazil, which became known as the Copacabana Fort revolt. Following release from prison he took part in further rebellions including the so-called Prestes Column from 1925 to 1927.

== Tenente revolts ==
=== 18 of the Copacabana Fort revolt ===
Siqueira Campos was born in Rio Claro, São Paulo, on 18 May 1898.

On 5 July 1922, Campos participated in a revolt at Fort Copacabana against the government. This marked the beginning of the tenente uprisings. Junior army officers, or lieutenants (Portuguese: tenente), had been trained to European standards and believed themselves superior to their senior officers, who they saw as being too closely identified with the government and existing political structure. They were also demanding various forms of social modernization, and calling for agrarian reform and the nationalization of mines.

The rebellion did not receive widespread support amongst the military, and only 200 rebels remained in the fort when it was bombarded by two planes and a ship the following morning. The rebels were driven from their positions and a group of them, subsequently known as the 18 of the Copacabana Fort revolt, were led down Avenida Atlântica, the road going along Copacabana Beach, by Siqueira Campos and Eduardo Gomes to confront army loyalists. Sixteen were killed and only Gomes and Campos survived.

=== Prestes Column ===
Campos had been seriously injured. The following year, after leaving prison when a writ of habeas corpus was granted by the Supreme Military Court, he went into exile in Uruguay. He then devoted himself to trading activities in Montevideo and later in Buenos Aires. In 1924, he crossed clandestinely into Brazil from Argentina and resumed revolutionary activities by encouraging a riot at an army garrison in São Borja in the state of Rio Grande do Sul. He then joined a group of rebels led by Luís Carlos Prestes who had risen against the government in other parts of Rio Grande do Sul. Defeated, they moved to the state of Paraná, where they joined other forces that had rioted in São Paulo under the command of General Isidoro Dias Lopes. From this merger, what became known as the Prestes Column emerged in April 1925 in order to campaign against the government of Artur Bernardes. The Column was divided into four detachments, with Siqueira Campos commanding one of them.

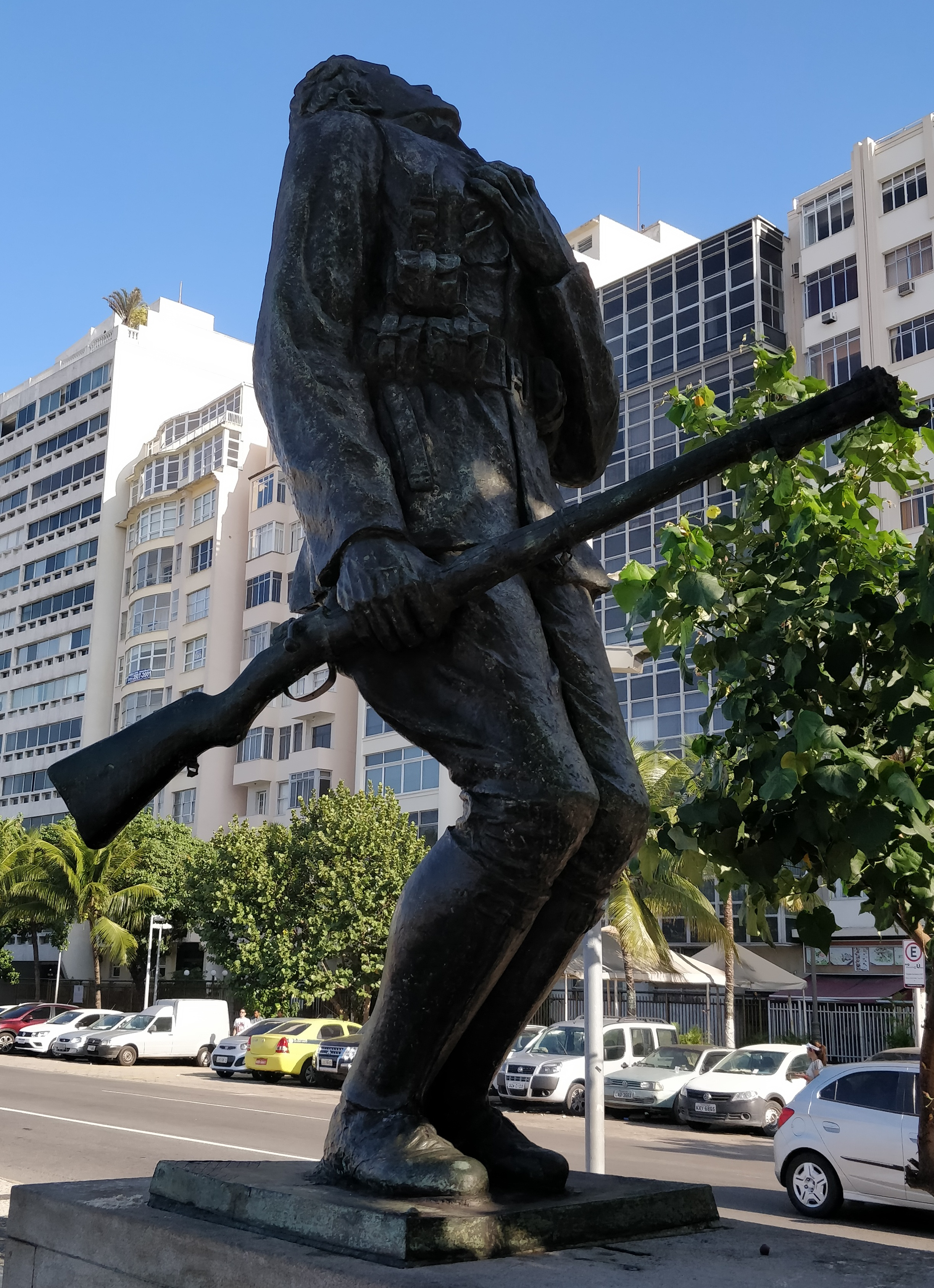
Statue of Siqueira Campos on Copacabana Beach

In February 1927, after almost two years of marching, the revolutionaries decided to stop the armed struggle, which is considered to have contributed to the Revolution of 1930 when Getúlio Vargas rose to power. Siqueira Campos settled in Buenos Aires in 1927, devoting himself to regrouping the Brazilian revolutionaries who were in exile in Argentina and Uruguay. In 1929, he made some clandestine trips to Brazil in order to encourage young military men to join the revolution.

Campos died in May 1930, before the 1930 revolution broke out, when his plane crashed into the River Plate while returning to Brazil. Campos is celebrated by a statue on Avenida Atlântica and by a street in Copacabana named after him, which later also gave its name to a station on the Rio de Janeiro Metro network. Other places named after him can be found in São Paulo, Belém, and Pouso Alegre.
