= List of "return unwanted" concentration camp prisoners =

This article is a list of prisoners of Nazi concentration camps designated return unwanted (German: Rückkehr unerwünscht), which was used to forbid their release and indicate that their death was desired by the Nazi regime.

Name	Born	Died	Reason	Result
Konrad Adenauer	1876	1967	Opposition to the regime	Survived Messelager Köln, Cologne-Hohenlind Hospital and Brauweiler. Avoided transport to Buchenwald by faking illness (according to Eugen Zander)
Antonia Bruha	1915	2006	Austrian Resistance activist	Survived Ravensbrück
Norbert Čapek	1870	1942	Founder of the Czech Unitarian Church, listened to the BBC	Died at Dachau
Jaroslav Dobrovolský	1895	1942	Czechoslovak Resistance fighter	Died at Mauthausen
Joseph E. Drexel	1896	1976	German Resistance member	Survived Mauthausen and Flossenbürg
Gisi Fleischmann	1892	1944	Leader of the Bratislava Working Group, an illegal Jewish organization that tried to rescue European Jews, especially Slovak Jews, from the Holocaust	Deported to Auschwitz 18 October 1944, led away by SS guards and never seen again
Willy Gay	1890	1975		Survived Mauthausen and Flossenbürg
Edmond Goergen	1914	2000	Luxembourg Resistance member	Survived Hinzert, Sachsenhausen and Mauthausen
Leo Haas	1901	1983	Graphic artist; with other artists, smuggled drawings about the Holocaust into neutral countries	Survived Auschwitz and Sachsenhausen
Krafft Werner Jaeger	1919	2008	German Resistance fighter involved in 20 July plot	Survived Sachsenhausen
Jan Jebavý	1908	1942	Czechoslovak Resistance member	Killed at Mauthausen
Rosa Jochmann	1901	1994	Austrian Resistance activist	Survived Ravensbrück
Siegfried Lederer	1904	1972	Witnessed the Lidice massacre	Escaped from Auschwitz 5 April 1944 with the help of an SS guard
Gertrud Müller	1915	2007	German Resistance fighter	Survived Ravensbrück, Natzweiler-Struthof and Munich-Allach
Erna Musik	1921	2009	Austrian Resistance activist	Survived Auschwitz and Ravensbrück
Zofia Pociłowska-Kann	1920	2019	Polish Resistance member	Survived Ravensbrück
Fritz Pröll	1915	1944	German Resistance fighter	Killed himself at Mittelbau-Dora
Josef Pröll	1911	1984	German Resistance fighter	Survived Dachau, Natzweiler-Struthof and Buchenwald
Stefanie Ranner	1923	1944	Relationship with a Polish forced laborer resulting in pregnancy	Died at Ravensbrück
Barbara Reimann	1920	2013	German Resistance member; wrote anti-war letters to soldiers	Survived Fuhlsbüttel and Ravensbrück
Herbert Schemmel	1914	2003	Subversive statements and listening to foreign radio stations	Survived Sachsenhausen and Neuengamme
Irma Thälmann	1919	2000	German Resistance member; daughter of Ernst Thälmann	Survived Ravensbrück
