= Johannes Lohs =

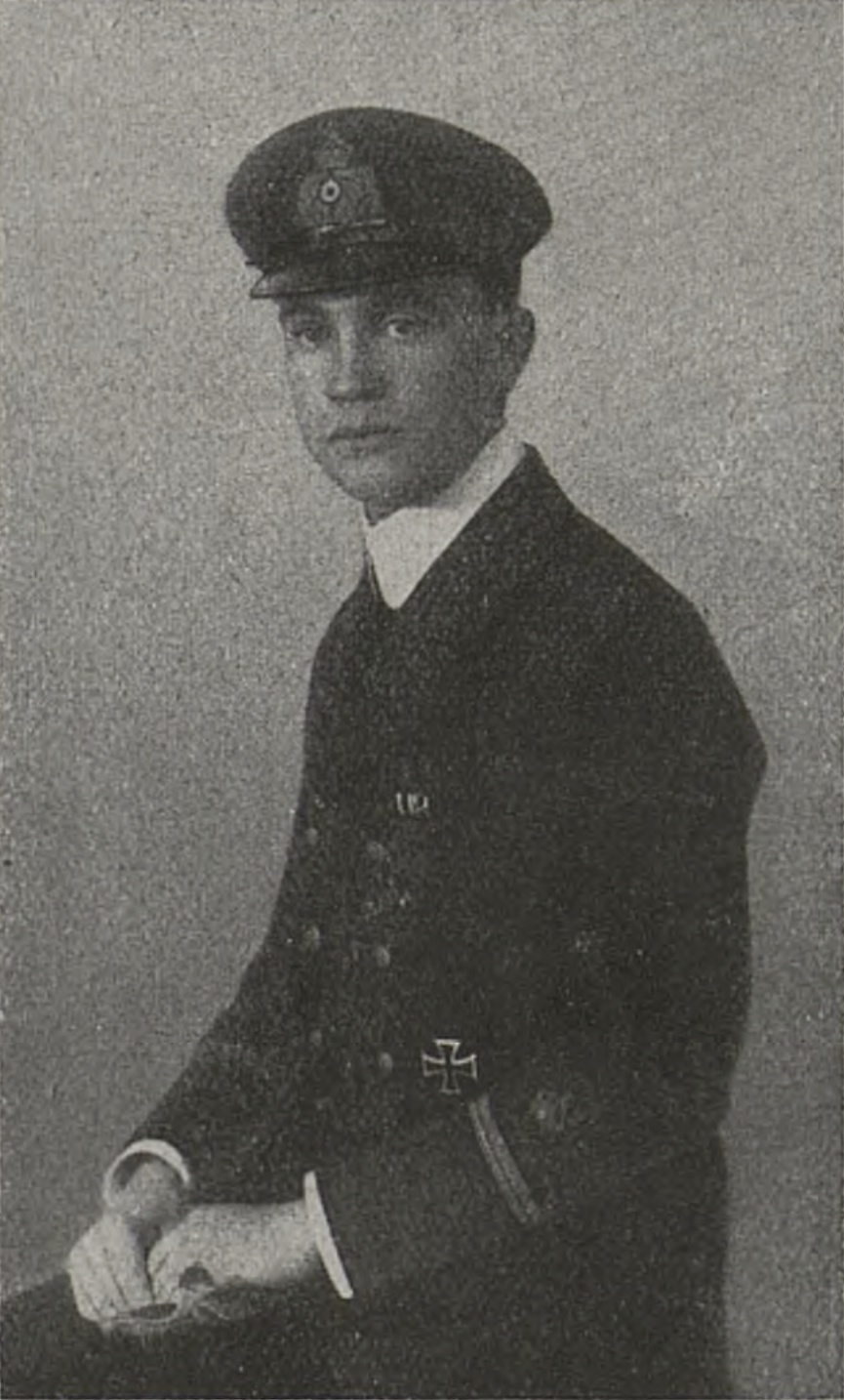
- Johannes Lohs (Illustrirte Zeitung, 1918)
- Born: 24 June 1889; Einsiedel, Saxony
- Died: 14 August 1918 (aged 29); North Sea
- Military career
- Allegiance: German Empire
- Branch: Imperial German Navy
- Service years: 1909–18
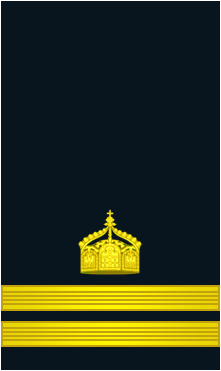
- Rank: Oberleutnant zur See
- Commands: SM UC-75, 17 March 1917 – 30 January 1918; SM UB-57, 2 January – 14 August 1918
- Conflicts: U-boat Campaign (World War I)
- Awards: Pour le Mérite

Johannes Lohs (24 June 1889 – 14 August 1918) was a successful and highly decorated German U-boat commander in the Kaiserliche Marine during World War I.

== Early life ==
Lohs was born on 24 June 1889 at Einsiedel, Saxony. He was the son of plant owner Oswald Lohs. He first went to school in his home village and later to a grammar school in Chemnitz.

Lohs entered on 1 April 1909 as midshipman the Imperial Navy, completed his basic training at the Großer Kreuzer SMS Victoria Louise and then came for further training to the naval Academy, where he was appointed on April 12, 1910 to Fähnrich zur See. On November 3, 1911 he was transferred to the light cruiser SMS Berlin and promoted on 19 September 1912 to Leutnant zur See. From 23 December 1912 Lohs acted as a signal officer on the light cruiser SMS Strassburg.

== World War I ==
On 2 May 1915 Lohs was promoted to Oberleutnant zur See. For one month Lohs was second radio officer on the battlecruiser Seydlitz, then he moved to U-Bootschule for two months. Afterwards he became a monitoring officer at the torpedo boat division. On 6 December he became commander of SM UC-75, on which he did 9 patrols along the British coast. On 2 January 1918 he became Commanding officer of UB-57, taking over the command of this boat from another legendary U-boat commander, Otto Steinbrinck. Lohs had also some very good ideas on U-boat warfare and new tactics and on 24 April 1918 he received the Pour le Mérite.

On 3 August 1918, he sailed from Zeebrugge for the last time. The last contact he made with the base was on the evening of 14 August as UB-57 was homeward bound roughly in the area of the Sandiette Bank, east of the Strait of Dover. Nothing more was heard. Lohs and 33 men lost their lives.UB-57 is believed to have run onto a mine. Lohs' body washed up on shore a week later and he is buried in the military cemetery at Vlissingen.

Lohs succeeded on 13 patrols in sinking 76 ships for a total tonnage of 149,465 gross register tons (GRT). He also damaged 17 other ships and sank the armed merchant cruiser HMS Moldavia.

In the later Kriegsmarine, the 3rd U-boat Flotilla in Kiel was named after him.
