= Radibor =

Radibor/Radwor
- Municipality
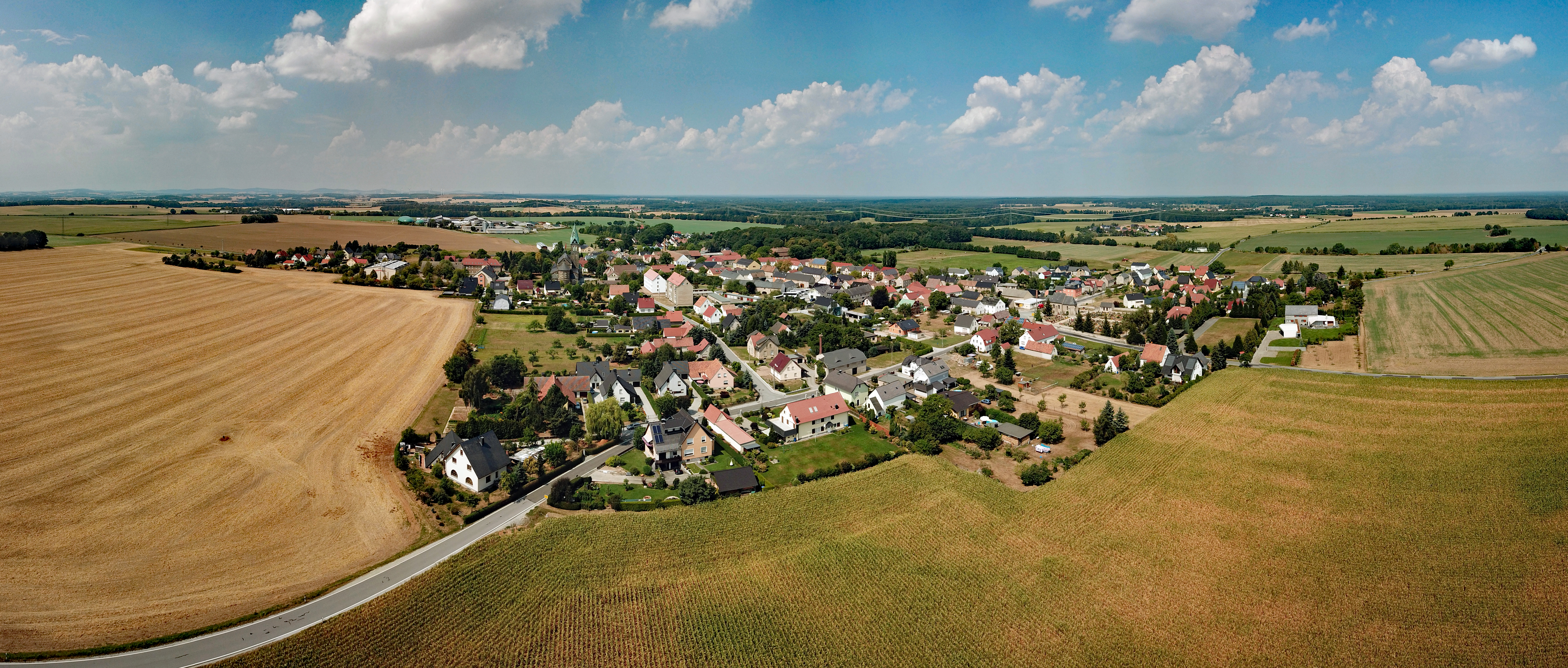

- Location of Radibor/Radwor within Bautzen district
- Interactive map of Radibor/Radwor
- Location within Germany Location within Saxony
- Coordinates: 51°15′N 14°24′E
- Country: Germany
- State: Saxony
- District: Bautzen

Government
  - Mayor (2020–27): Madeleine Rentsch

Area
  - Total: 61.93 km^{2} (23.91 sq mi)
- Elevation: 165 m (541 ft)

Population (2025-12-31)
  - Total: 3,060
  - Density: 49.4/km^{2} (128/sq mi)
- Demonym(s): German: Radiborer; Upper Sorbian: Radworčan (m.), Radworčanka (f.)
- Time zone: UTC+01:00 (CET)
  - Summer (DST): UTC+02:00 (CEST)
- Postal codes: 02627
- Dialling codes: 035935
- Vehicle registration: BZ, BIW, HY, KM
- Website: radibor.de

Radibor (German) or Radwor (Upper Sorbian: [ˈʁadwɔʁ]) is a municipality in Saxony in Germany. It is situated in Upper Lusatia about 10 km north of Bautzen, which is also the main city of the District of Bautzen to which Radibor belongs.

Radibor was first mentioned in a written source in 1359. Its name is of Sorbian origin and generally means "place of the council". The municipality belongs to the central settlement area of the Sorbs.

== History ==
Radibor was first mentioned in a bishop's charter in 1221. Other early references appear in the records of the Diocese of Meissen in 1346 and again in 1359. A parish community already existed around 1220. The origin of the place name has not been conclusively determined, but it is undoubtedly of Sorbian origin. Based on the oldest known form of the name, Ratibor, etymologists today consider it likely to be a combination of rat ("war") and boriti se ("to quarrel, fight"). Theories suggesting that the name derives from a hero who "likes to fight" have no parallels elsewhere in Lusatia.

The parish of Radibor was the only one in Saxony under secular feudal rule that remained Catholic after the Reformation. During the 16th and 17th centuries, the Protestant lords of the estate made several attempts to convert the parish to Protestantism, but these efforts always failed because of strong resistance from the local population.

In 1890, Radibor received a railway station on the Bautzen–Königswartha railway line, which was later extended to Hoyerswerda. From 1906 onward, it was also connected to Weißenberg and Löbau via the Löbau–Radibor railway line, the first and only completed section of the Saxon Northeastern Railway. An extension of the Saxon Northeastern Railway through Crostwitz to Kamenz and further via Radeburg to Riesa had been planned but was never realized. Passenger service toward Löbau was discontinued in 1972, while service between Bautzen and Hoyerswerda ended in 1999. The two railway lines were officially closed in 1998 and 2001 respectively and were subsequently dismantled.

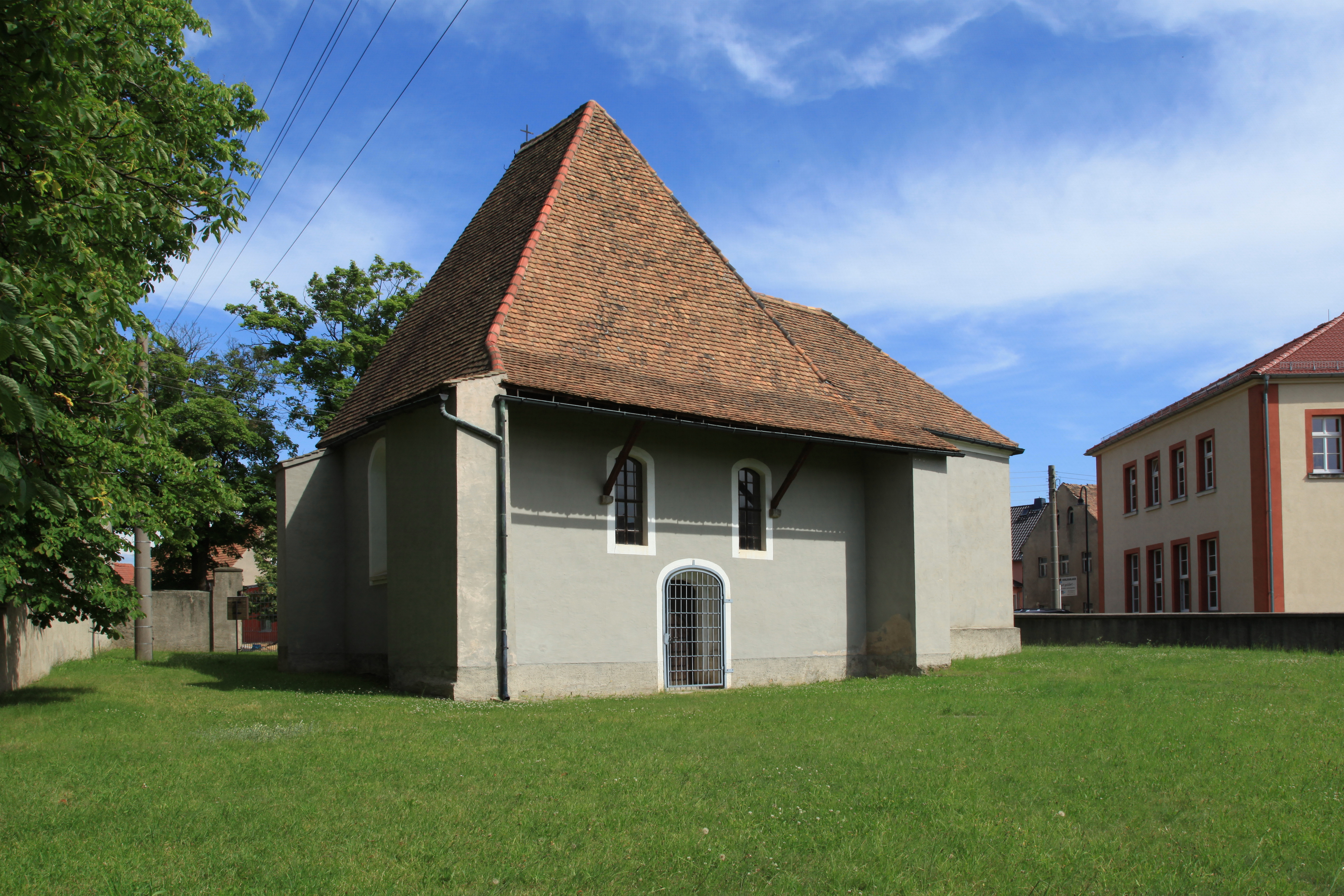
Old Parish Church

In 1895–1896, the new parish church of Mary, Queen of the Holy Rosary (Cyrkej swj. Marije, kralowny swjateho róžowca) was built in the southern part of the village, in addition to the existing houses of worship—the Old Parish Church (13th century) and the Church of the Holy Cross (1397). Its distinctive tower can be seen from far away.

The municipality of Luppa was incorporated on January 1, 1994, and Luttowitz was incorporated into Radibor on the same date. On October 1, 1998, the three districts of Cölln, Großbrösern, and Milkwitz, formerly part of the municipality of Kleinwelka, were added. Milkel was incorporated on January 1, 1999.

In 2011, the martyr-priest Alois Andritzki, who was born in Radibor, was beatified by Pope Benedict XVI.

== Geography ==
Following villages belong to the municipality of Radibor (names given in German/Upper Sorbian, followed by the number of inhabitants):

- Bornitz/Boranecy, 124 inh.
- Brohna/Bronjo, 82 inh.
- Camina/Kamjenej, 110 inh.
- Cölln/Chelno, 352 inh.
- Droben/Droby, 90 inh.
- Großbrösern/Wulki Přezdrěń, 30 inh.
- Grünbusch/Haj, 16 inh.
- Kleinbrösern/Přezdrěnk, 5 inh.
- Lippitsch/Lipič, 203 inh.
- Lomske/Łomsk, 195 inh.
- Luppa/Łupoj, 189 inh.
- Luppedubrau/Łupjanska Dubrawka, 65 inh.
- Luttowitz/Lutobč, 161 inh.
- Merka/Měrkow, 119 inh.
- Milkel/Minakał, 328 inh.
- Milkwitz/Miłkecy, 90 inh.
- Neu-Bornitz/Nowe Boranecy, 48 inh.
- Neu-Brohna/Nowe Bronjo, 11 inh.
- Quoos/Chasow, 156 inh.
- Radibor/Radwor, 634 inh.
- Schwarzadler/Čorny Hodler, 29 inh.
- Strohschütz/Stróžišćo, 5 inh.
- Teicha/Hat, 61 inh.
- Wessel/Wjesel, 77 inh.

== Demography ==
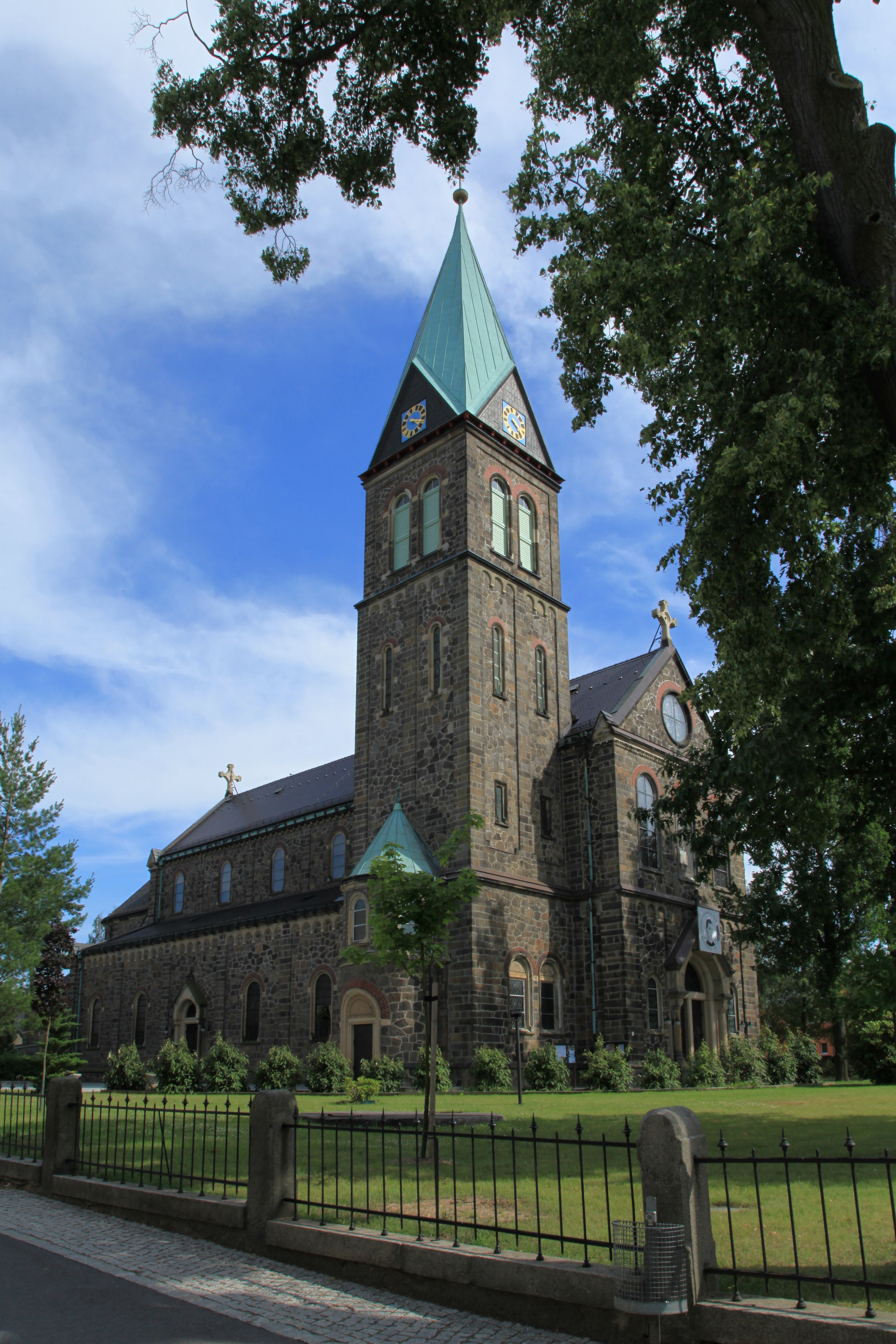
Church of Mary, Queen of the Holy Rosary in Radibor

For his statistics on the Sorbian population in Upper Lusatia, Arnošt Muka determined in the 1880s that Radibor had 571 inhabitants, of whom 548 were Sorbs (96%) and 23 were Germans. In 1956, Ernst Tschernik still recorded that 73.2% of the population of the municipality of Radibor spoke Sorbian.

According to the 2011 census, the municipality had 3,299 inhabitants. Of these, 1,137 were Roman Catholic (34.4%), 1,081 were Protestant (32.8%), and 1,081 belonged to another religion or to no religious community (32.8%). In 2022 census, out of 3,146 inhabitants, the share of the Catholic population was 33.7%, 28% were Protestant, and 38.6% belonged to another faith or to none.

== Education ==
The municipality of Radibor is home to the Sorbian primary and secondary school "Dr. Marja Grólmusec." According to plans by the Saxon Ministry of Education, the secondary school was to be closed due to declining student numbers. However, the municipality successfully challenged this decision before the Higher Administrative Court. The school remains one of only four Sorbian secondary schools still operating in Saxony.

== Sights and memorials ==
The municipality's cultural monuments are listed in the register of cultural monuments of Radibor.

=== Radibor Castle ===
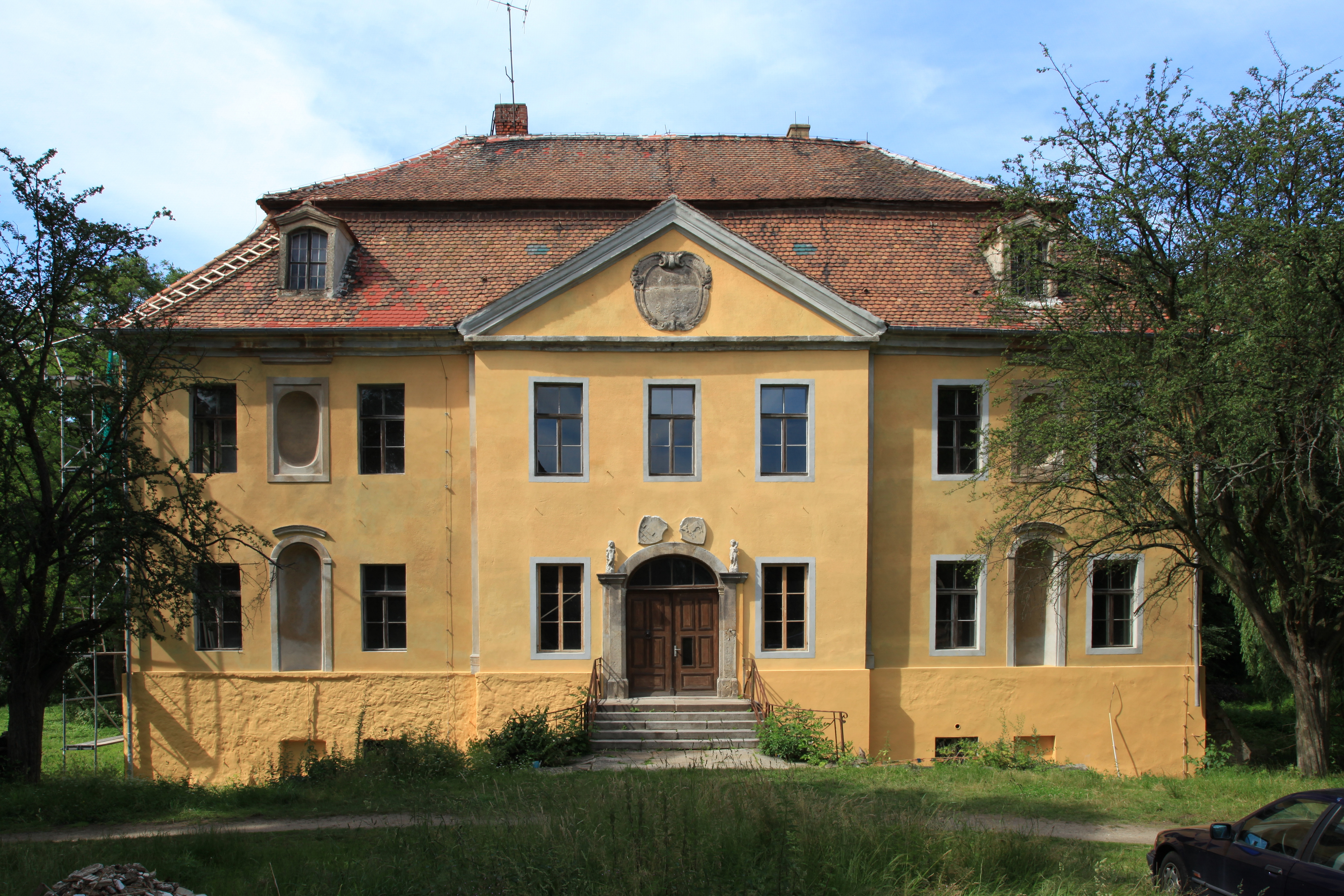
Radibor Castle

Radibor Castle (Radworski hród) was first mentioned in 1397 as the property of Sigismund Behr, a citizen of Bautzen. Over the centuries it passed through the hands of several noble families, including the von Bolberitz, von Plaunitz, von Haugwitz, von Minckwitz, von Burkersroda, von Schack, von Ried, von Bolza, von Gondrecourt, von Bose, von Swoboda, von Voss, and the Counts of Einsiedel.

The present Baroque castle was commissioned in 1719 by Friedrich Wilhelm von Schack. After changing ownership several times, the estate remained with the von Welck family until 1945. In 2021, the Alves Heilbronner family purchased the manor house and began an extensive heritage-sensitive restoration after roughly 90 years of deterioration.

=== Memorial to Alois Andritzki ===
A copper plaque created in 1984 by artist Werner Juza at the municipal administration building commemorates Alois Andritzki, the Catholic priest and resistance fighter who was murdered in 1943 in the Dachau Concentration Camp Memorial Site.

=== Memorial to Maria Grollmuß ===
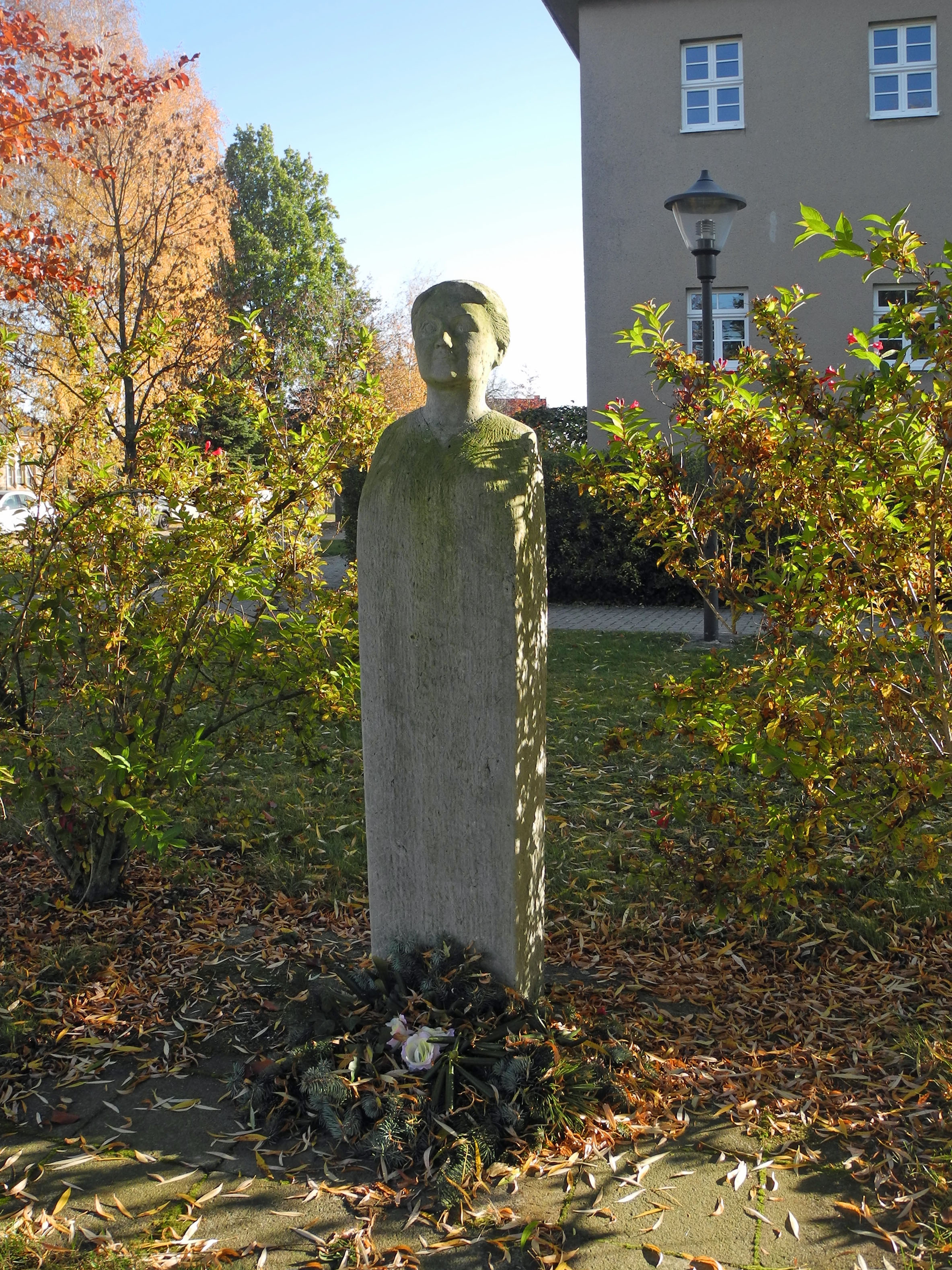

A portrait bust by sculptor Rudolf Enderlein in front of the school commemorates Maria Grollmuß, who died in 1944 in the Ravensbrück Memorial concentration camp. Her grave in the local cemetery bears a memorial plaque unveiled in 1948 by Max Seydewitz, then Minister-President of Saxony.

== People ==
- Wolf Heinrich von Baudissin (1549–1646), Prussian field marshal during the Thirty Years' War
- Procopius Hantschke (1731–1789), monk of Neuzelle Abbey and Sorbian writer.
- Jakub Lorenc-Zalěski (1874–1939), writer and anti-fascist journalist; born in Radibor.
- Józef Nowak (1895– 1978), priest, poet, and journalist; parish priest in Radibor from 1931 to 1968.
- Maria Grollmuß (Marja Grólmusec) (1896–1944), Catholic and socialist resistance fighter.
- Jurij Winar (1909–1991) composer and music educator; born in Radibor.
- Alois Andritzki (Alojs Andricki) (1914–1943), Catholic priest and martyr; born in Radibor.
- Cyril Kola (1927–2026), dramaturge, novelist, literary critic, translator; born in Radibor.
