= Martha Desrumeaux =

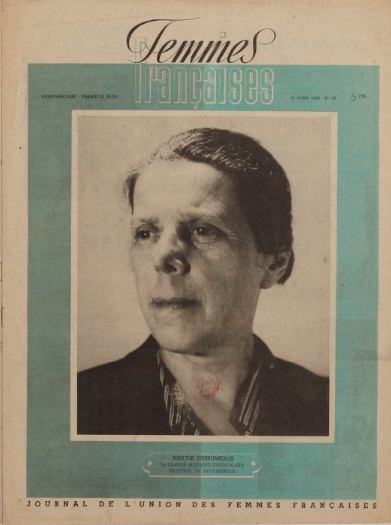
- Front page of Femmes Françaises with Martha Desrumeaux on the cover
- Born: October 18, 1897; Comines
- Died: November 30, 1982 (aged 85); Évenos, France

Martha Desrumaux (18 October 1897 - 30 November 1982) was a militant communist and a member of the French Resistance.

Martha Desrumaux was born on October 18, 1897, in Comines in France. She was an emblematic figure of the workers' movement and the French internal resistance. A trade union activist of the General Labor Confederation and member of the French Communist Party, she joined the resistance in the North. Deported to the Ravensbrück concentration camp for more than three years, in 1945 she was appointed delegate representing the deportees in the Consultative Assembly convened by General de Gaulle, becoming one of the first sixteen parliamentary representatives in France1,2. She is also known for her commitment to the defense of women's rights, their recognition and their emancipation in society.

As one of the prominent Ravensbrück concentration camp inmates Martha Desrumaux was publicly commemorated during the liberation celebrations at the Ravensbrück National Memorial of the German Democratic Republic (GDR), like Yevgenia Klemm, Antonina Nikiforova, Mela Ernst, Rosa Jochmann, Katja Niederkirchner, Rosa Thälmann, Olga Benário Prestes, Olga Körner, Minna Villain, and Maria Grollmuß.

Desrumaux died on November 30, 1982, in Évenos.
