= Olga Körner =

German politician (1887–1969)

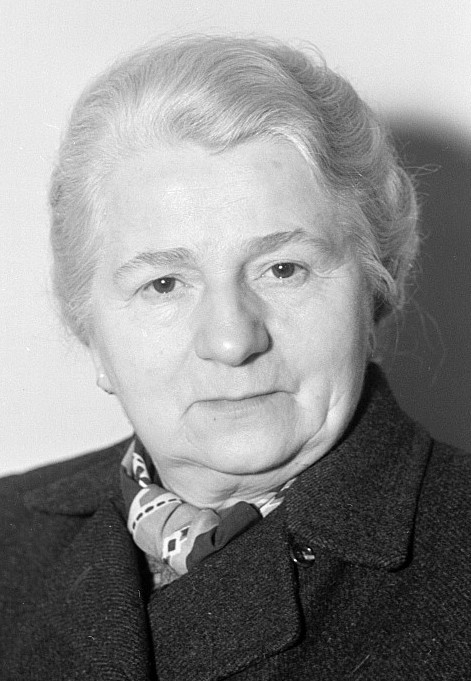
- Körner in 1947
- Born: Olga Schubert; 3 June 1887; Rübenau, Kingdom of Saxony, German Empire
- Died: 22 December 1969 (aged 82); Dresden, Bezirk Dresden, East Germany
- Occupations: political & resistance activist politician
- Political party: SPD; USPD; KPD; SED
- Spouse: Theodor Körner
- Children: y

Olga Körner (born Olga Schubert: 3 June 1887 – 22 December 1969) was a German political activist and a co-founder of the proletarian women's movement in Dresden. Between 1930 and 1933 she sat as a member of the national parliament ("Reichstag").

== Life ==
=== Early years ===
Olga Schubert was born into a working-class family in Rübenau (now part of Marienberg), a village on the German frontier with Bohemia, to the south of Dresden. From 1901 until 1903 she worked in domestic service. Between 1903 and 1909 she worked in the flowers and textiles sectors. In 1907 she relocated to what is today the Dresden quarter of Dobritz. She married Theodor Körner the next year. By 1920 she had also trained for work as a seamstress and cook.

=== Politics ===
On 8 March 1911 she joined the German Social Democratic Party (SPD). She was also involved in organising strikes. She worked on building up the proletarian women's movement in Dresden and in Saxony more widely: and early in 1918 she also took part on the Saxon Munitions Worker Strike. The decision of the SPD leadership in 1914 to support funding for the war had not been universally supported within the party, and became more contentious as the extent of the slaughter on the front and destitution domestically grew. In 1917 the party split apart, primarily over the issue of support for the war, and Körner moved over with breakaway faction, which became known as the Independent Social Democratic Party (Unabhängige Sozialdemokratische Partei Deutschlands / USPD). When the USPD itself split three years later she was part of the majority that made up the newly created German Communist Party. Within the party she was a member of the regional group in Dresden-Leuben. She was also engaged in the party's welfare operation, Red Aid ("Rote Hilfe"), the "Red Women's and Girl's League" (" Rote Frauen- und Mädchenbund") and a workers' sports association. In 1921 she became a member of the party's regional leadership team ("Bezirksleitung") for East Saxony. In 1929 she became a member of the Dresden city council.

She was elected a communist party member of the Saxony Regional parliament ("Landtag") on 1930. That same year, in the national election of September 1930, she was elected to the national parliament ("Reichstag") for the Dresden-Bautzen electoral district. Within the parliament she was a member of the Commission of Social and Health Matters.

=== Nazi years ===
Early in 1933 Körner attended a course at the "National Rosa Luxemburg Party Academy". However, in January 1933 the backdrop changed dramatically when Nazis took power and converted Germany into a one-party dictatorship. In the space of a couple of months political activity (except in support of the Nazi party) became illegal. In April 1933 Olga Körner fled to Czechoslovakia, but in July she returned to Germany. She now became the leader of a (by definition illegal) resistance group in Radeberg, and then in Chemnitz where, on 23 August 1933, she was arrested. In March 1934 the high court in Dresden sentenced her to two years imprisonment, which she spent in the Waldheim Prison. Following her release in September 1935 she remained under close surveillance by the police until 1939, in which year war was resumed. In November 1939 Olga Körner was re-arrested.

She spent the next five and a half years interned in Ravensbrück concentration camp, to the north of Berlin. In 1943 she learned that her husband and son were dead. At Easter in 1945 she arrived on foot in Dresden, accompanied by two fellow former inmates, and comrades from their resistance days, called Else Eisold and Liesel Grabs.

=== Soviet occupation zone / German Democratic Republic ===
In Dresden, political activity being no longer outlawed, she became the Women's Secretary for the party's Dresden district, and secretary with the regional leadership team for Saxony. After 1946 she took over the Work and Social Policy and secretariat for Saxony in the Socialist Unity Party (Sozialistische Einheitspartei Deutschlands / SED) The SED was formed in April 1946 through a contentious merger, in this part of Germany, involving the Communist Party and the more moderately left wing SPD. The entire central portion of what had been Germany had been administered, since May 1945, as the Soviet occupation zone, and the SED was on its way to becoming a new one-party dictatorship, formally launched in October 1949 as the Soviet sponsored German Democratic Republic ("East Germany"). Between 1946 and 1950 Körner also had a position on the Party Executive ("Partei Vorstand"), and until 1952, when it was abolished as part of a wider administrative restructuring, she sat as a member of the regional parliament ("Sächsischer Landtag") and of the short-lived "Länderkammer".

In 1955 she suffered a health crisis, with nervous exhaustion which appears to have resulted from overwork. She was still working intensively, including a good deal of travel in connection with consultancy work, when she was 70.

Olga Körner was one of the prominent Ravensbrück concentration camp inmates who were publicly commemorated during the liberation celebrations at the Ravensbrück National Memorial of the GDR, like Yevgenia Klemm, Antonina Nikiforova, Mela Ernst, Rosa Jochmann, Katja Niederkirchner, Rosa Thälmann, Olga Benário Prestes, Martha Desrumaux, Minna Villain, and Maria Grollmuß.

She died on 22 December 1969 at the age of 82. After her death, a secondary school in Dresden was named after her in 1974, and her bronze bust was unveiled in front of a retirement home in Dresden-Zschertnitz in 1978.
