= Käthe Niederkirchner =

German Communist anti-Nazi resistance activist (1909–1944)

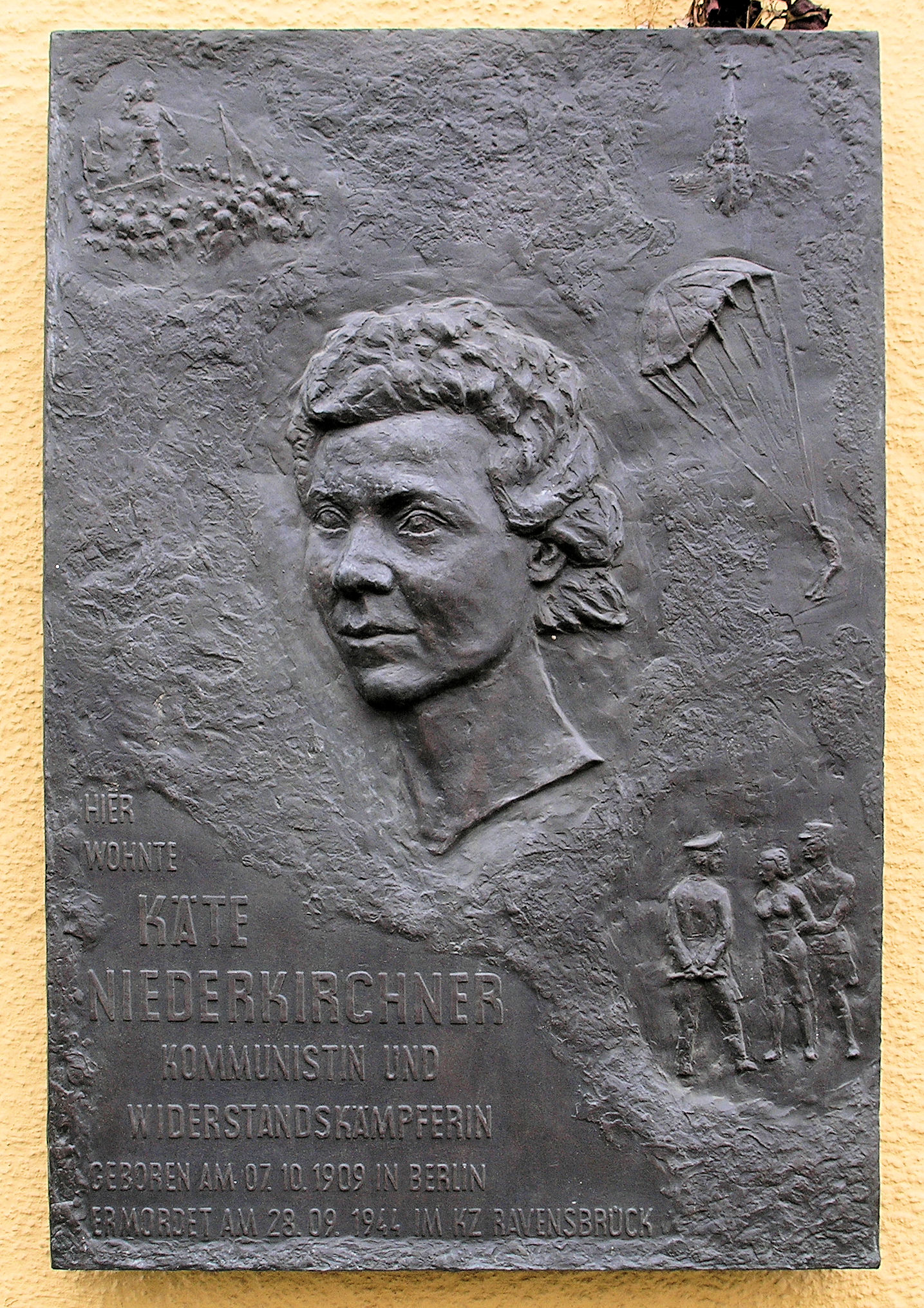
- Memorial plaque, Käthe Niederkirchner, Pappelallee 22, Berlin-Prenzlauer Berg
- Born: 7 October 1909; Berlin, German Empire
- Died: 27/28 September 1944 (aged 34); Ravensbrück concentration camp, Mark Brandenburg, Nazi Germany
- Occupations: Political activist Rebel
- Political party: Communist Party of Germany
- Parent(s): Michael Niederkirchner (1882-1949); Helene _____ (1889-1967)

Käthe "Katja" Niederkirchner (7 October 1909 - 28 September 1944) was a German Communist resistance activist who was fatally shot by Nazi paramilitaries on the night of 27/28 September 1944 at Ravensbrück concentration camp.

Although the number of people who died under similar circumstances is incalculably large, one of several things that marks out the case of Käthe Niederkirchner is the extent to which she was celebrated by public authorities after her death.

== Biography ==
Käthe Niederkirchner was born in Berlin. Her father, Michael Niederkirchner (1882–1949) was an industrial worker active in the trades union movement who had moved with his wife to Berlin in 1906, having been born a member of the German-speaking minority community in Budapest. Käthe's mother, Helene, came from "a Slovak gypsy family" and could neither read nor write. According to Käthe's niece, Käte Niederkirchner, Helene was "sold into domestic service" when she was 11, after which she was employed as a maid with a respectable middle-class family in Hungary. She became pregnant. Her partner in pregnancy was the son of the family for whom she worked. He accordingly looked after the mother, later marrying her. The son whose birth had triggered the marriage of Käthe's parents was "sold to America". The phrase "sold to America" (German: nach Amerika verkauft) comes from Käthe Niederkirchner's niece, a pediatrician-politician, named after her aunt. Once they had married, Michael and Helene Niederkirchner went on to have five recorded children. Käthe was the third of these (and the second daughter). The pediatrician-politician niece offers her own verdict on her aunt's family provenance: "Our family is full of peculiarities, but that does also teach tolerance". (Note: "Unsere Familie steckt voller Eigentümlichkeiten, aber das lehrt auch Toleranz.")

While the children were still small their father was conscripted into the army and sent to the Russian front, though he would later proudly recall that he never fired a gun at anyone in a war which was being waged by the rich against the poor of every land. He was a prisoner of war at the time of the October Revolution and agitated among his fellow prisoners in support of the Bolshevik leaders who captured the Russian Revolution. Meanwhile, the children's mother was able to stay in Germany, but had to work in a grenade factory. In January 1919 Michael Niederkirchner returned from the Russian Soviet Federative Socialist Republic (Note: Росси́йская Сове́тская Федерати́вная Социалисти́ческая Республик) (as the Russian Empire had by now become). He did not hesitate to share his political insights with his family: it was therefore unsurprising that Käthe Niederkirchner followed in her father's political footsteps and became a member of a communist children's group. Later she joined the Young Communists. She was still only just 20 when, in 1929, she joined the party itself.

Sources indicate that as a child Käthe Niederkirchner was sensitive but without any great propensity to melancholy, beautiful and well-liked but thoughtful and still something of a loner. She liked to sing, and she became a member of the Fichte (worker's gymnastics club), becoming a hardworking functionary of it. Her father encouraged her to read suitable literature. In this connection sources mention that the works of Tolstoy, Gorky and Jack London featured prominently on her reading list. It is asserted that she soon knew half of the works of Heine by heart. But her favourite piece of literature was the collected volume of letters written from prison by the assassinated communist heroine Rosa Luxemburg.

After leaving school she responded to her father's insistence that each of his children should master a trade by completing an apprenticeship in garment manufacturing ("Schneiderlehre"). However, in October 1929 the Wall Street Crash heralded a Great Depression, exacerbated by more than ten years of government mercantilism across the west. Germany underwent a sustained surge in unemployment as Niederkirchner emerged with her tailoring qualification. Her father had submitted several applications for German citizenship since settling in Berlin 1906 on behalf of himself and his family, but these had all been rejected. The family still carried Hungarian passports, and Käthe Niederkirchner was mostly unemployed during the early 1930s. That did leave more time for self-improvement and for politics, however. She also mastered shorthand and worked on her foreign languages, attending appropriate courses at the Marxist Workers' Academy ("Marxistische Arbeiterschule" / MASCH) in Berlin.

In Autumn 1932, during a speech at a women's meeting held in connection with a public transport strike in Berlin, Niederkirchner was arrested. During a period of intensifying political polarisation she had drawn attention to herself by delivering speeches and political leaflets on behalf of the Communist Party. A couple of months later, seizing an opportunity presented by several years of parliamentary deadlock, in January 1933 the National Socialists took power and lost no time in transforming Germany into a one-party dictatorship. The authorities were particularly uncompromising in their attacks on the activities carried out on behalf of the (now illegal) Communist Party. Members of the Niederkirchner family had already faced several politically driven expulsion orders over the years, but these had, till now, never been implemented. This time the situation had changed, and Käthe Niederkirchner was forced to leave the country on 27 March 1933. Although the family still retained their Hungarian citizenship, Hungary had been moving towards fascism since the installation of Gyula Gömbös as miniszterelnök (head of government) in October 1932. Käthe Niederkirchner instead made her way to Moscow to start a new life. After the authorities released her father and deported him from Germany in June 1934 she was reunited with her parents and three of her four siblings in the Soviet Union. (Her youngest sister, Mia (1911–1982) stayed behind, "living underground (unregistered)" in Germany for another couple of years.)

During the 1920s many youthful western communist idealists had grown up seeing the Soviet Union under its communist leadership as humanity's best hope for the future. Käthe Niederkirchner arrived ready to embrace her new homeland, and after arriving in Moscow in many ways she was able to benefit from the new opportunities, even though she never returned to a career in tailoring. She intensified her study of Marxism–Leninism and other important subjects. She appears to have been able to support herself without difficulty. For a while she worked as a German-language presenter for Moscow Radio. However, the Soviet Union was also affected by growing political tensions. At the height of the Stalinist purges, her older brother Paul Niederkirchner was arrested in Moscow by the security services. He was shot dead on 19 October 1938. The situation changed further in June 1941 when the German government unexpectedly (to most) repudiated an important existing non-aggression agreement launched a massive invasion of the Soviet Union. In 1941 Käthe Niederkirchner married Heinz Wieland, a communist hero of the recently concluded Spanish Civil War. However, it is unclear whether they were ever able to live together, since in the chaos of war party authorities moved Wieland, who had been badly wounded in Spain, to a home for invalids in Osh (Kyrgyzstan). One indirect result of the German invasion of the Soviet Union was Soviet sponsorship of the "antifascist Free Germany" (Freies Deutschland) organisation, under the auspices of which Niederkirchner involved herself extensively in training/propaganda work with German prisoners of war. She also undertook intensive training in after-dark parachute jumping and for "underground work" in Germany.

On the night of 7 October 1943 Käthe Niederkirchner celebrated her 34th birthday by jumping out of a Soviet military airplane in the countryside near Warsaw. She was accompanied in the enterprise by a fellow activist called Theodor Winter, who was also the son in law of Wilhelm Pieck, a leader of the group of exiled German communists based in Moscow at this time. Her parachute caught in a tree from which she was rescued by Polish partisans. The whole of western Poland was still under German occupation. The Polish partisans also helped Niederkirchner and her companion make their way to the nearest railway station. (The leader of the group involved later became a Polish ambassador to the German Democratic Republic.) Niederkirchner's instructions were that she should make her way to Berlin, but she and Winter were caught and arrested in or near Königsberg before she ever reaching their destination. It later transpired that they had been betrayed to the German authorities by someone on the Russian side. In Niederkirchner's rucksack the police found a radio transmitter. It had been the intention of her Soviet handlers that she should use it, in working with "resistance groups" believed to be active in Berlin, to help facilitate and hasten the invasion of Berlin by the Red army.

As the end approached Käthe Niederkirchner was concerned that her father might never find out the truth about what had happened to her. In her cell she wrote a note which she managed to pass to a friend:

- "Today I want to take my leave of those I love. I have a feeling that I will not be here much longer. You must tell my dearest father that I have not disgraced him. I did not betray anyone. My thoughts are with him always."
- "Heute will ich Abschied nehmen von meinen Lieben. Ich habe eine Ahnung, daß ich nicht mehr lange hier sein werde. Meinem lieben, teuren Vater müßt ihr sagen, daß ich ihm keine Schande gemacht habe. Ich habe niemanden verraten. Meine Gedanken sind ständig bei ihm."

The friend added a message of her own to Michael Niederkirchner:

- "We, the comrades at Ravensbrück, have followed the path taken by Comrade Niederkirchner and we state to her father, Comrade Michael Niederkirchner, that he can be proud of his daughter. We mourn with him for his daughter. She was a brave comrade and a remarkable person."
- "Wir Ravensbrücker Kommunistinnen haben den Weg unserer Genossin Niederkirchner verfolgt und sagen ihrem Vater, Genossen Michael Niederkirchner, daß er auf seine Tochter stolz sein kann – wir alle trauern mit ihm um seine Tochter, sie war eine tapfere Genossin und ein seltener Mensch ..."

Niederkirchner spent nearly a year in a succession of jails where in which she was repeatedly and severely tortured. At one point she made a suicide attempt, but was "rescued". There was never any trial process. Finally, in May 1944, she was delivered to the Ravensbrück concentration camp for women where, after a few weeks, she was moved into solitary confinement. Several diary pages that she wrote at the time have survived. At least one letter that she wrote from the concentration camp is also quoted in sources. Unnamed comrades who survived Ravensbrück and reported on their experiences wrote the following on Käthe Niederkirchner:

- "The Gestapo used all their methods to get information out of Comrade Niederkirchner, but they failed. Comrade Niederkirchner conducted herself brilliantly and stood firm against the frightful methods of the Gestapo". (Note: "Die Gestapo versuchte mit allen Mitteln, aus der Genossin Niederkirchner etwas herauszubringen, was ihr aber nicht gelungen ist. Genossin Niederkirchner hat sich glänzend gehalten und ist gegenüber den furchtbaren Methoden der Gestapo standhaft geblieben.")

Käthe Niederkirchner's life ended after she was shot by Nazi paramilitaries on the night of 27/28 September 1944 at Ravensbrück concentration camp.

== Celebration ==
In the German Democratic Republic (1949–1990) more than 300 collectives, businesses, kindergartens, sports associations were named after Käthe Niederkirchner. Many of these still carry her name.

- In the centre of East Berlin, Prinz Albrecht Straße, which had become infamous during the National Socialist period for its associations with the Gestapo and torture, was renamed Niederkirchnerstraße in 1951.
- The Kurt-Schwitters-Oberschule ("Kurt Schwitters Senior School") in (East) Berlin's Prenzlauer Berg quarter was renamed after Käthe Niederkirchner after the nearby Lippehner Straße had become the Käthe-Niederkirchner-Straße in 1974.
- The Hertwig Bünger Retirement Home in Radebeul was named after the liberal centrist politician Doris Hertwig-Bünger in 1929/30. In 1951 it was renamed "Feierabendheim Käthe Niederkirchner".
- The National People's Army's airforce battalion Number 9, stationed at Peenemünde had the honorific suffix "Käthe Niederkirchner" added to its name on 1 March 1970. The Air force service facility at nearby Karlshagen was similarly honoured in 1973.
- The East German Cargo ship "Käthe Niederkirchner" was named after her. In 1965, on just her second voyage since launch, the ship hit the headlines in Scotland when, carrying a cargo of sugar from Cuba towards Rostock, she ran aground (without loss of life) on Muckle Skerry, in the Pentland Firth.
- Käthe Niederkirchner was one of the prominent Ravensbrück concentration camp prisoners who were publicly commemorated during the liberation celebrations at the GDR's Ravensbrück National Memorial, like Yevgenia Klemm, Antonina Nikiforova, Mela Ernst, Rosa Jochmann, Olga Benário Prestes, Rosa Thälmann, Olga Körner, Martha Desrumeaux, Minna Villain, and Maria Grollmuß.
