= Niederkirchnerstraße =

Street in Berlin, Germany

- Niederkirchnerstrasse
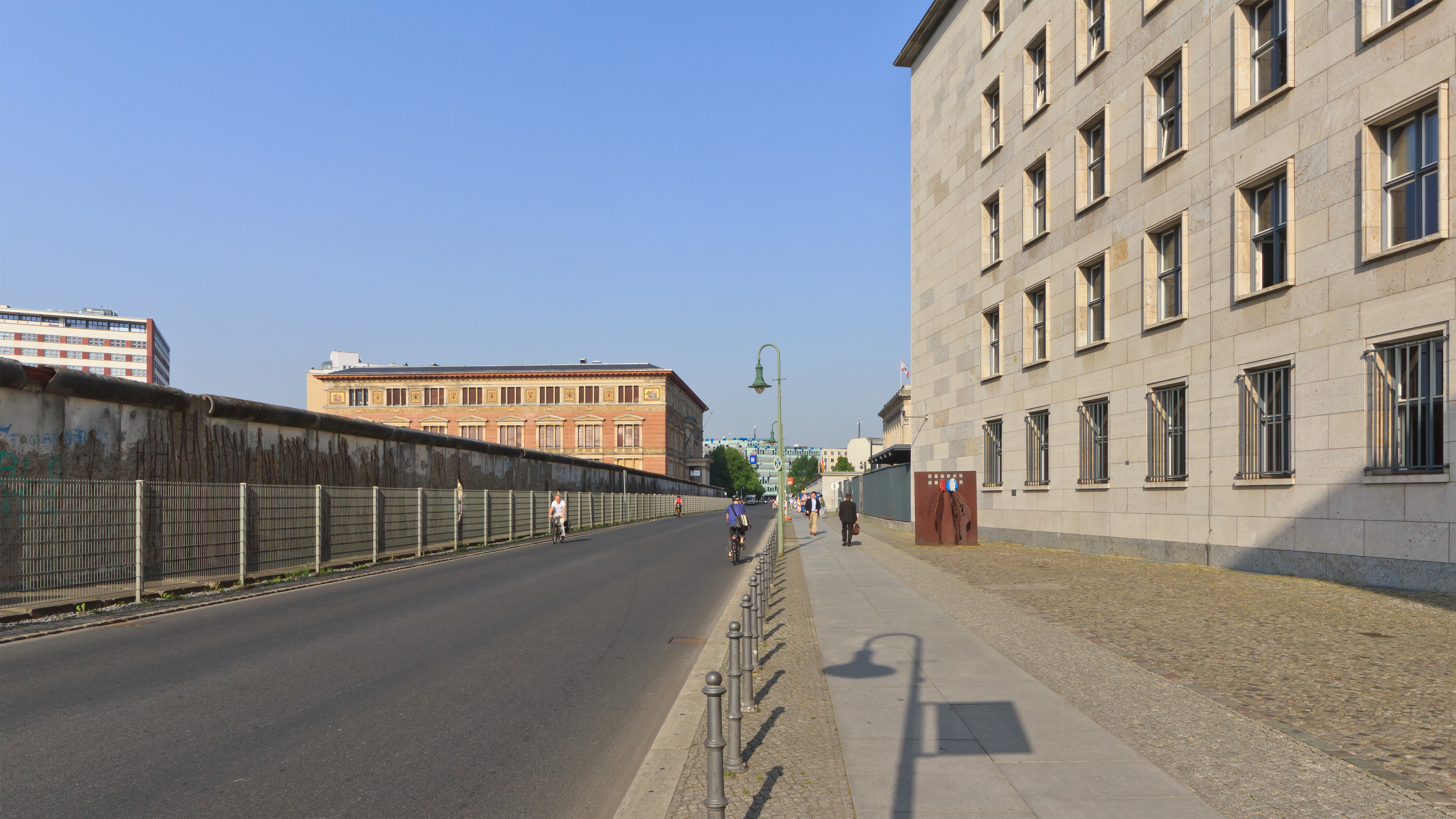
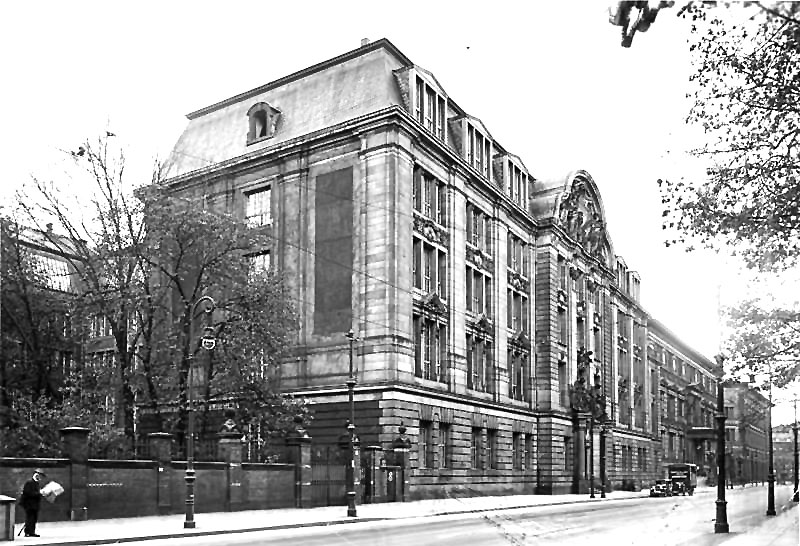
- A preserved section of the Berlin Wall adjacent to Niederkirchnerstraße in 2014 The same location showing Reich Security Main Office (Prinz-Albrecht-Straße No.8) in 1933.
- Interactive map of Niederkirchnerstraße
- Former names: Verlängerte Zimmerstraße; (to 1891); Prinz-Albrecht-Straße; (1891–1951)
- Namesake: Käthe Niederkirchner
- Type: Street
- Location: Berlin, Germany
- Quarter: Mitte
- Nearest metro station: Kochstraße; Potsdamer Platz; Anhalter Bahnhof
- Coordinates: 52°30′26″N 13°22′57″E
- East end: Zimmerstraße; Wilhelmstraße
- West end: Stresemannstraße

Niederkirchnerstraße or Niederkirchnerstrasse (see ß; German: [ˈniːdɐkɪʁçnɐˌʃtʁaːsə]) is a street in Berlin, Germany and was named after Käthe Niederkirchner. The thoroughfare was known as Prinz-Albrecht-Straße until 1951 but the name was changed by the East German government to honour Niederkirchner's legacy as a resistance fighter against the Nazi regime. The street was the location of the SS Reich Security Main Office (RSHA), the headquarters of the Sicherheitspolizei, SD, Einsatzgruppen and Gestapo. The site is now marked by the Topography of Terror memorial and a museum, which includes a permanent exhibition showing the crimes of Nazism.

== Course ==
The street runs east-west from Wilhelmstraße to Stresemannstraße near Potsdamer Platz, forming the border between the districts of Mitte and Kreuzberg.

Niederkirchnerstraße is also the site of the Martin-Gropius-Bau exhibition hall, built in 1881 by Martin Gropius and Heino Schmieden as a Museum of Decorative Arts, and the Abgeordnetenhaus von Berlin, from 1899 until 1933 seat of the Preußischer Landtag, the second chamber of the Prussian parliament. On 1 January 1919 the Communist Party of Germany was founded in this building. Since 29 April 1993 it houses the parliament of the Berlin city state.

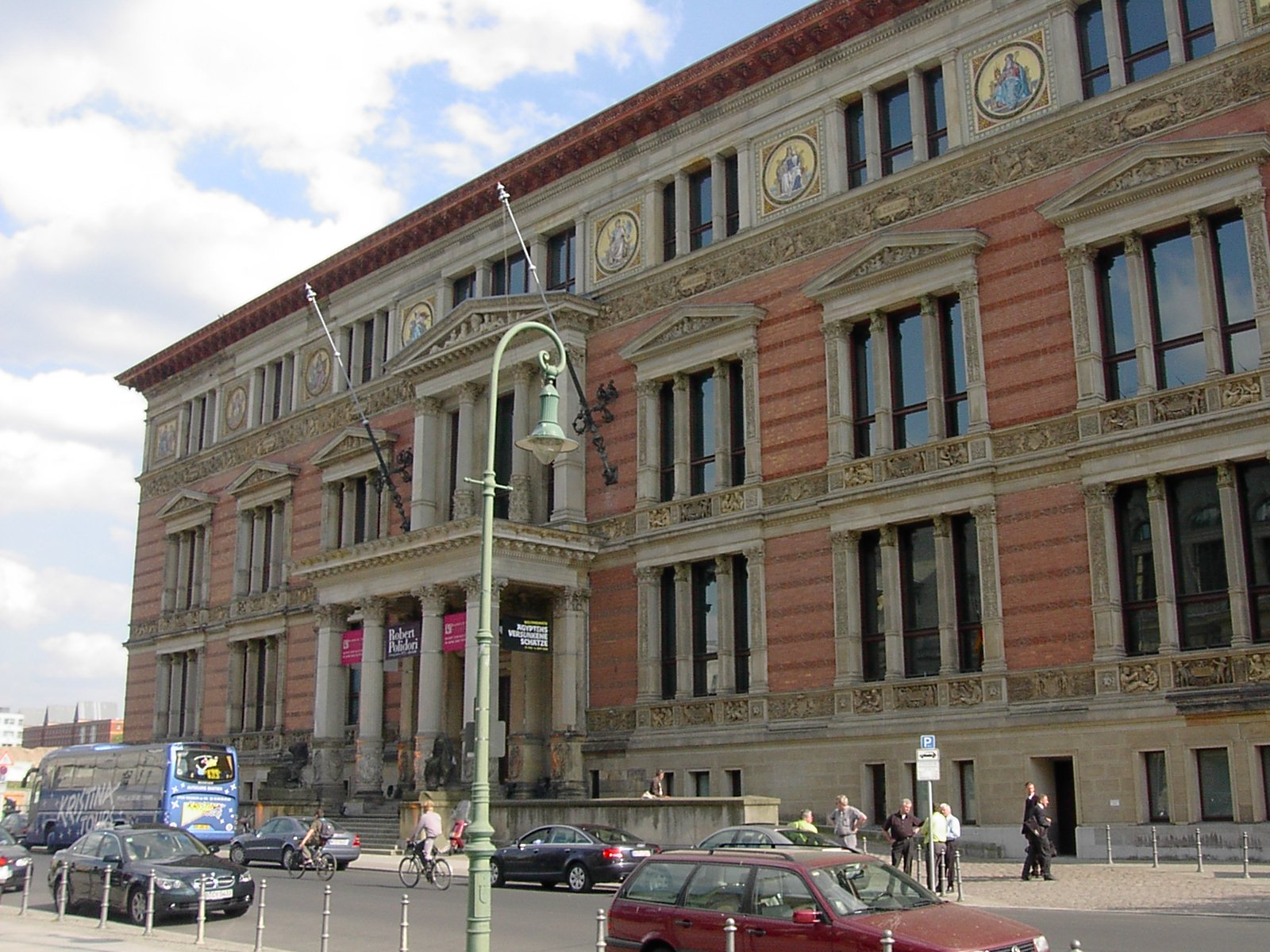
Martin-Gropius-Bau

== History ==
The street was laid out in 1891 and named for Prince Albrecht of Prussia (1809-1872, the youngest son of King Friedrich Wilhelm III of Prussia), who had owned a large house called Prinz-Albrecht-Palais on the corner of this street and the Wilhelmstraße.

In 1905 an extension building of the Museum of Decorative Arts was erected adjacent to the Martin-Gropius-Bau on Prinz-Albrecht-Straße 8. From May 1933 this building served as the headquarters of the Gestapo created by the order of Hermann Göring, where many political prisoners were tortured and executed. In December 1934, it also housed the headquarters of the Concentration Camps Inspectorate, which oversaw all German concentration camps. It formed the nucleus of the complex of buildings including the neighbouring Hotel Prinz Albrecht on Prinz-Albrecht-Straße 9 and the Prinz-Albrecht-Palais itself, which was taken over by the Sicherheitsdienst (SD) under Reinhard Heydrich in 1934. In September 1939, it developed into a centre for the Reich Security Main Office (RSHA). The RSHA, formed in September 1939 by Heinrich Himmler and placed under the command of Heydrich, operated throughout Germany and occupied Europe. Himmler himself operated out of the building from an office on the first floor, thus making #8 Prince Albrecht Street the default headquarters for the entire SS.

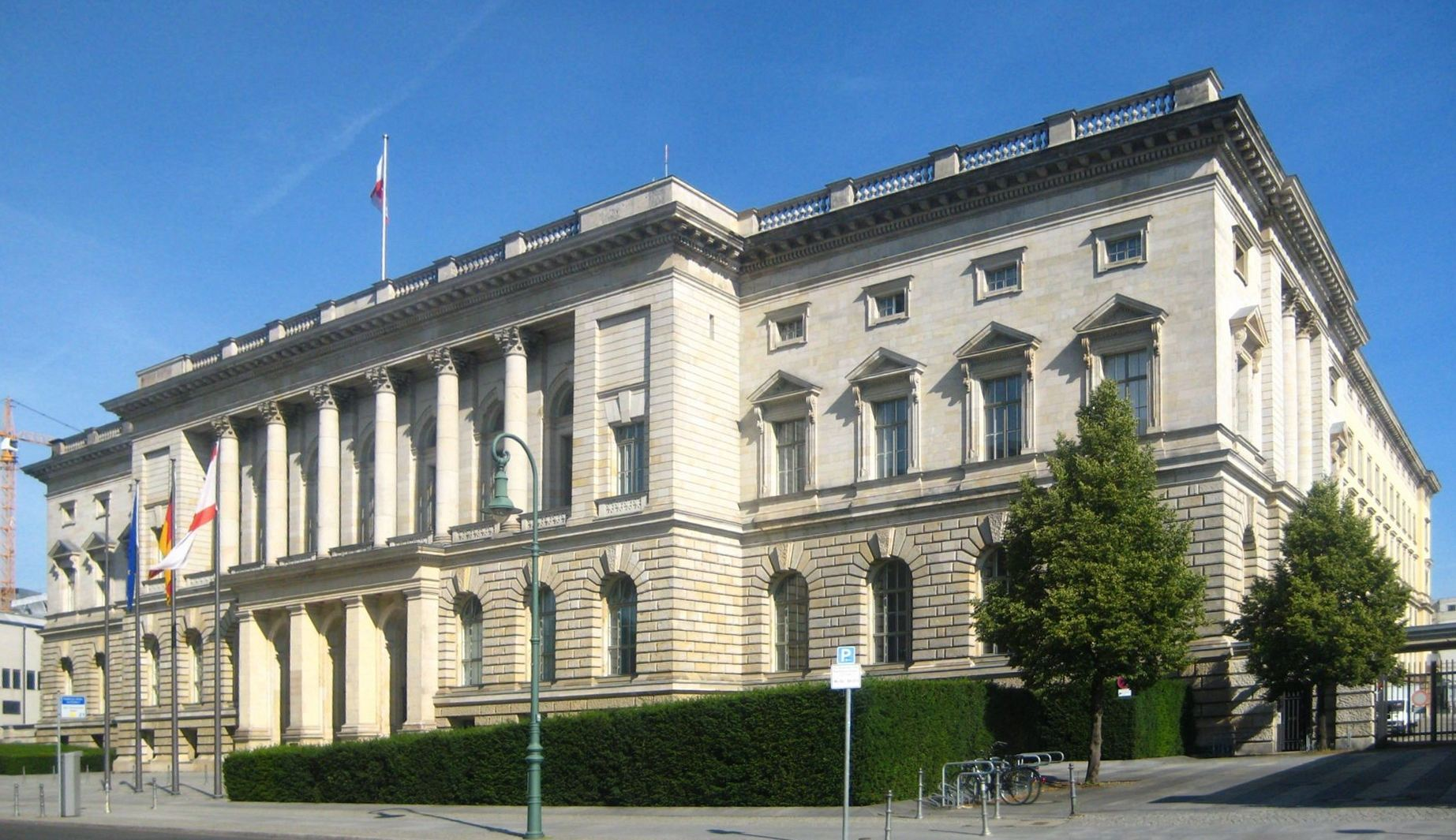
Abgeordnetenhaus

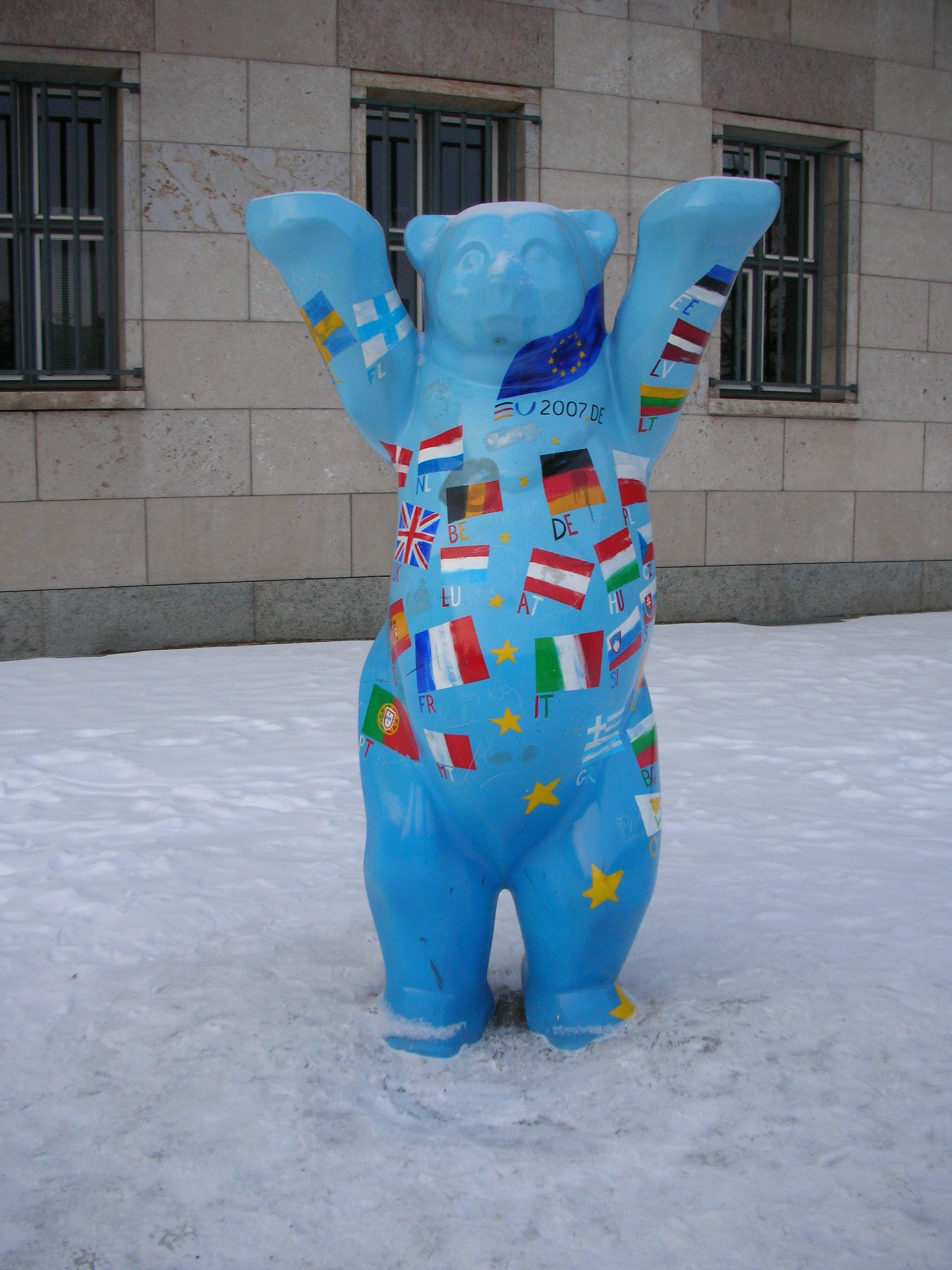
The Europe-Buddy-Bear in front of the Federal Ministry of Finance in the Niederkirchnerstrasse

The buildings, including the first building of the Ethnological Museum of Berlin (at the southern corner with Stresemannstraße), were destroyed by Allied bombing in early 1945 and demolished after the war. After World War II, in 1951, the authorities of East Berlin renamed Prinz-Albrecht-Straße to Niederkirchnerstraße in honour of Käthe Niederkirchner (1909–1944), a member of the communist resistance to the Nazis. The Berlin Wall ran along the southern side of the street from 1961 to 1989 – one of the few preserved sections is located at the eastern end.

== In popular culture ==
A building labeled "SS Headquarters" appears in the 2008 motion picture Valkyrie, the complex shown appearing as a large concrete building in a plaza draped with swastika flags. In reality, this was never an SS building but was the Berlin fairgrounds. The mini-series Hitler's SS: Portrait in Evil further depicts SS headquarters as a grand hotel in a courtyard plaza, with the interior shown as a large lobby with a grand staircase leading up to Heinrich Himmler's office. Both depictions in no way resemble the historic Prinz-Albrecht-Straße, although "Hitler's SS" did accurately depict the building as being located within a former hotel. Numerous historical novels and thrillers set in Nazi Germany have sections taking place in the Prinz-Albrecht-Straße headquarters.
