= Alojs Andritzki =

German Roman Catholic priest (1914-1943)

Blessed Alojs Andritzki
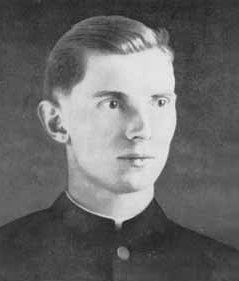

Martyr
- Born: 2 July 1914; Radibor, Bautzen, German Empire
- Died: 3 February 1943 (aged 28); Dachau concentration camp, Upper Bavaria, Nazi Germany
- Venerated in: Roman Catholic Church
- Beatified: 13 June 2011, Cathedral of the Holy Trinity, Dresden, Germany by Cardinal Angelo Amato
- Feast: 3 February

Alojs Andritzki (firstname also written Aloys, in Upper Sorbian Alojs Andricki; 2 July 1914 – 3 February 1943) was a Sorbian Roman Catholic priest who suffered martyrdom in the Dachau Concentration Camp in 1943. He was ordained as a priest just prior to the beginning of World War II in which he became a vocal critic of the Nazi regime and its actions; this earned him their ire and he was arrested before being sent to the Dachau concentration camp where he was administered a lethal injection.

His beatification was celebrated in Dresden on 13 June 2011.

== Life ==
Alojs Andritzki was born in 1914 as the fourth of six children to the schoolteacher Johann Andritzki and Magdalena Ziesch. His father took all the children once a month to visit various shrines and instilled in them piety. This prompted his two older brothers to become priests themselves. His two sisters were Marja and Marta and his three brothers were Jan and Great and Alfons who was the sixth child and a Jesuit who died in World War II as a soldier.

In 1934 he began theological studies at Paderborn and later began official studies to become a priest in Bautzen; he was elevated to the diaconate in 1938. Andritzki received his ordination to the priesthood on 30 July 1939 in Bautzen from Bishop Petrus Legge and he celebrated his first Mass in Radibor on the following 6 August.

The Gestapo oversaw his arrest on 21 January 1941 for producing Christmas theatre and was described as having made "hostile statements" against the Nazi regime thus the motivator for his arrest. He was interrogated on 7 February 1941 and was first sent to the detention center at Dresden but was moved two months later on 2 October 1941 to the Dachau concentration camp with the prisoner number 27829. Back in July 1941 he was sentenced to six months due to "insidious attacks" against the regime. His father sent a moving letter to Berlin asking for pardon since there were no charges but this appeal was instead ignored. He was a talented musician and artist and had painted the Nativity scene in the prison barracks for Christmas for a makeshift chapel. He also entertained fellow inmates when he would walk on his hands. It was while imprisoned that he met the two Schoenstatt priests Joseph Fischer and Heinz Dresbach.

He fell ill with typhoid around Christmas of 1942 but did not go to the infirmary until 19 January 1943. Andritzki's final request was to receive the Eucharist but the guards and warden scoffed at this suggestion and decided instead to euthanize him; the warden jeered and said: "He wants Christ. We'll give him an injection instead". He received the lethal injection and died as a result of this overdose of chemicals. The Nazis claimed that he died of abdominal typhoid in order to hide the fact that the priest had been murdered. His remains were incinerated and his ashes were sent in an urn to his parents. The urn was interred in a Dresden cemetery on 15 April 1943. His remains were later relocated to Dresden Cathedral on 5 February 2011. The Sorbs have long revered him.

== Beatification ==
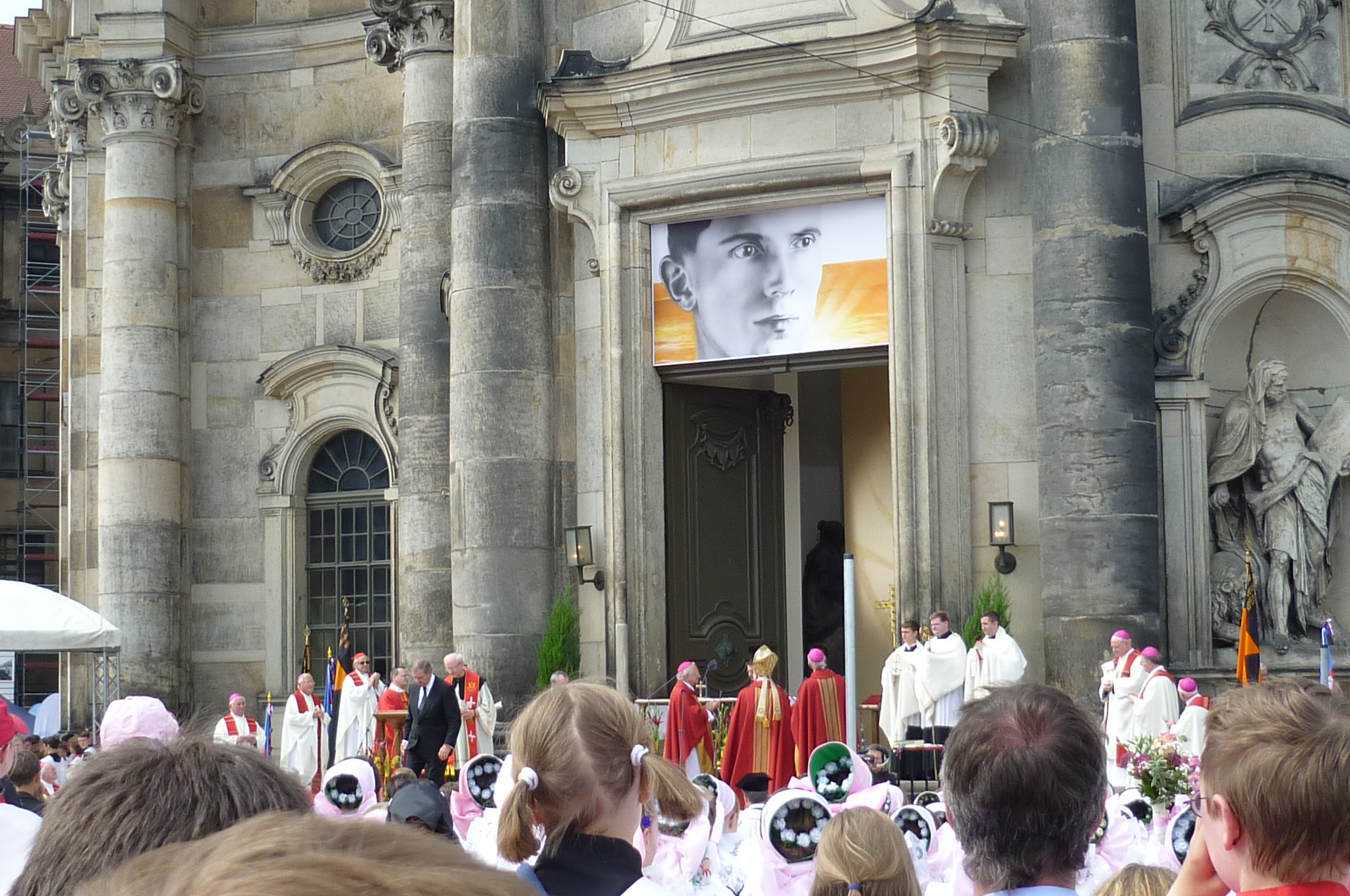
Beatification in Dresden 2011

The beatification process opened in a diocesan process that spanned from 1 July 1998 until its closure sometime later on 22 March 2001. Pope Benedict XVI confirmed on 10 December 2010 that Andritzki was killed in odium fidei ("in hatred of the faith") and therefore approved his beatification. Cardinal Angelo Amato presided over it on the pope's behalf on 13 June 2011 in Dresden with around 11,000 people in attendance including the Bishop of Dresden-Meissen, Joachim Reinelt, and the Saxony State Premier Stanislaw Tillich.

The postulator for the cause of Andritzki is Andrea Ambrosi.
