= Kleinwelka =

Subdivision of Bautzen, Germany

Coordinates: 51°13′N 14°24′E

Situation of Kleinwelka in Bautzen

Kleinwelka (Sorbian: Mały Wjelkow) is a subdivision of the city of Bautzen, Germany. It was first mentioned in 1345. Since the mid-18th century it has been the site of a settlement congregation of the Moravian Church, the Herrnhuter Brüdergemeinde; for many years it was the seat of a boarding school for the children of missionaries from all over the world.

Kleinwelka is a station of the Osterreiten, a regional Easter procession on horseback, from Bautzen to Radibor.

Its main sites of interest are the Saurierpark Kleinwelka and the adjacent Irrgarten (hedge maze).
