= Erna Musik =

Austrian politician and activist

- Born: Erna Raus; 17 April 1921; Vienna, Austria
- Died: 8 March 2009 (aged 87); Vienna, Austria
- Occupations: Resistance activist Politician; Holocaust witness
- Spouse: Karl Musik (- 1977)
- Children: 3

Erna Musik (born Erna Raus: 17 April 1921 – 8 March 2009) was an Austrian Social Democratic Party member and resistance activist. She was a Holocaust survivor who later, as a businesswoman and local politician in Vienna, came to wider attention through tirelessly relating her experiences of Austrofascism and the concentration camps to younger generations, in order to try to avoid a revival of Nazism.

== Life ==
=== Provenance and early years ===
Erna Raus was born in Vienna, the youngest of her parents' seven recorded children. In terms of the race-based classifications that became important to governments after 1934, and more particularly, in the context of intensifying state-mandated antisemitism, after 1938, her father was considered "Christian" and her mother was considered "Jewish". Her father died when she was three, leaving her mother to bring the children up as a single working mother. The widow set up a "Weißnäherei" a small clothing business, concentrating on the manufacture of undergarments. As a child working in her mother's business, Erna Raus developed expertise in embroidery and producing linen goods.

Through her older brothers, who were all involved in Socialist youth organisations, Erna Raus became politically aware and herself joined socialist youth groups at a relatively young age. It was through the "Red falcons" that at the age of sixteen she first met the man who later became the father of her three children and whom, after the war, she would marry.

=== Anschluss ===
She was not quite 17 when Austria was integrated into an enlarged version of Germany, which since 1933 had been governed as a post-democratic one-party dictatorship. The result amounted to a National Socialist take-over and a far more uncompromising implementation of National Socialist philosophy as a core underpinning of government strategy. Erna was classified as a Half-Jew or, in the derogatory term favoured by government, "Mischling". Her (Jewish) mother's business was "aryanised" (confiscated and/or closed down), and although the family were not expelled from their small apartment, they were now required to share it with two other families. Erna, by now engaged to Karl Musik, gave birth to the couple's first daughter – also called Erna – in 1942.

=== Resistance ===
Erna involved herself in anti-government resistance, principally in support of her fiancé, Karl Musik. Sources provide very few details of her resistance activity. One act of defiance involved simply giving birth. Two of her four grandparents were classified by the authorities as "Jewish", which meant Erna Raus suddenly found that she was deemed a "Grade I Mischling", which ruled out any possibility of attending a girls' secondary school and meant that by becoming engaged to be married without obtaining special government permission (which was increasingly hard to obtain), and by giving birth to her fiancé's child, she was breaching the government's "race laws". Marriage was out of the question for the same reason.

Following the February uprising of 1934 the recently established Austrofascist government had enforced their new ban on the Social Democratic Party with determination. This had triggered the emergence of the Revolutionary Socialists, an antifascist socialist resistance movement, made up of activists from the crushed former party. Karl Musik had set up what sources identify as a Revolutionary Socialist cell in Vienna during this period. Erna and Karl were clearly aware of the personal danger in which their resistance involvement placed them both. Sources insist Erna's involvement in her lover's / fiancé's political activities was not great, but she did attend at least one Revolutionary Socialist meeting: her presence was reported, presumably by a fellow participant working as a government informant, to the security services.

=== Arrest and interrogation ===
Karl Musik was by this time operating "underground" – his address not registered with the city authorities – and avoided arrest, but towards the end of 1943 Erna Raus was arrested by the Gestapo. It is possible that her status as a "Half-Jew" who had given birth to a child by a deemed "Christian" increased the "interest" that the authorities took in her. For the next six months she was detained in a cell at the vast Rossauer Lände police building. She was here subjected to numerous interrogation sessions.

=== Auschwitz ===
Although government mandated race-based atrocities had been taking place since before 1938, in 1941/42 the scale of what came to be identified as the Holocaust intensified massively. Erna Raus's racial classification meant that once the police in Vienna had finished their questioning, she was unlikely to be released. Instead, on 15 April 1944 she was individually transported to the camp complex at Auschwitz, in the hills to the south of Katowice (Upper Silesia). She arrived at the camp accompanied by the ominous official tag "Rückkehr unerwünscht" ("Return not wished for"). (Note: "Rückkehr unerwünscht" was a standard formulation used for prisoners whom the authorities did not wish (or anticipate) should leave the concentration camp alive.) Initially she was set to heavy outdoor work, cutting squares of turf. The conditions made her ill and she was transferred temporarily to the "sick block". She was then set to work in the "cleaning barracks" where new arrivals, many of whom had come from other camps and/or prisons, were to be cleansed of their more readily removable afflictions. According to one source, the focus of her work was on "delousing". Like many Auschwitz prisoners she contracted Dysentery, but as far as her health permitted it she did what she could to use her "delousing" work to try and find ways to help fellow prisoners, many of whom were far more ill than she. Sources also mention her continuing resistance activism in the camp, without spelling out details of what was involved. Erna Raus continued to work in the camp "cleaning barracks" almost till the end of 1944, by which time, with the Soviet army approaching – apparently unstoppably – from the east, the Auschwitz camps were being cleared of inmates.

=== Ravensbrück ===
Sources differ over whether it was by means of an "evacuation transport" or as an involuntary participant in a "Death March" at the end of 1944 that Erna Raus was moved from Auschwitz to the women's concentration camp at Ravensbrück, a short distance to the north of Berlin. By this time Germany was being heavily bombed, and with the transport links badly degraded it is likely that the 700 km (435 miles) were covered by a combination that included both rail travel and forced marches. Suffering badly from dysentery, Erna Raus completed the journey only through the support of her sister and friends also involved in the forced transfer to Ravensbrück. They arrived in January 1945 in bitterly cold weather. The camp at Ravensbrück was desperately overcrowded. Emergency additional accommodation had been provided in the form of a large tent, but the tent was full, and Musik was forced to live outside. She remained ill, and survived only through the care and nursing of comrade inmates who included, at this stage, Käthe Sasso, a former resistance activist, like her, from Vienna. According to a newspaper obituary published at the time of her death, while an inmate at Ravensbrück Erna Raus became "Lagerkameradin" (loosely, "camp comrade") of the socialist militant Rosa Jochmann.

=== Malchow ===
A few weeks later Erna Raus was transferred again, this time to the satellite camp that had been set up at nearby Malchow a couple of years earlier in order to provide the adjacent Munitions Plant with forced labourers, mostly of foreign provenance. By 1945 more than 5,000 were employed. Early that year Erna Raus became one of them.

=== Marriage in Vienna ===
The inmates at the Malchow camp were released during the chaotic days of liberation during April 1945. War ended formally during the first week of May. It is not clear whether Erna Raus was among the 375 inmates evicted from the Malchow sub-camp by means of the so-called death march, during the course of which many died. Either way, she was able to make her way home to Vienna, at least 800 km (500 miles) to the south-east, across what was left of Germany. Like hundreds of thousands of others in a similar situation, she accomplished the journey almost entirely by walking. In Vienna, after three and a half years, she was reunited with her daughter. Karl Musik was also able to make his way home to Vienna, and on 8 June 1945 the two of them were married in the Brigittakirche. Erna Raus finally became Erna Musik. The couple's son was born in 1947 and a second daughter in 1957.

An early priority which Erna Musik actively supported was the rebuilding of the no-longer illegal Young Socialists organisation, and of the local Social Democratic Party in the Vienna-Brigittenau quarter. Through a restitution programme implemented by the military administrators, she was able to recover and in 1946 re-open her mother's embroidery and household textiles manufactory in the Leystraße which the previous government had "aryanised".

=== Vienna business community ===
Erna Musik joined the Freie Wirtschaftsverband (small businesses association), newly relaunched and renamed in order to emphasize its break with ten years during which it had effectively been taken over by the National Socialist government. The small businesses sector in Vienna was still heavily male-dominated, but Musik was able to use her membership of the association to build up its women's section. She also reached out beyond her own socialist political base, becoming the first SPÖ section president and a "Kommerzialrat" in the national Chamber of Commerce.

Between 1973 and 1987 she served as a district councillor in Vienna-Brigittenau. After her husband's death in 1977 she took charge of the local SPÖ, leading the Brigittenau district party group for fourteen years.

=== Witness ===
Through the post-war decades Erna Musik was committed to remembering the terror of the concentration camps and sharing this with the new generations. She made frequent presentations in schools on the matter and also served as an active member and honorary president of the Association of Socialist Freedom Fighters.

She helped to shape the Austrian exhibition section in the Auschwitz Memorial Museum and was a member of the Austrian Auschwitz Camp Association. Musik was also a member of the Ravensbrück Camp Association, serving as its chairwoman between 2000 and 2005.

With the Austrian Ministry for Social Affairs Erna Musik served as a member of the Victims' Welfare Commission, representing the interests of various concentration camp victims' associations.

=== Death ===
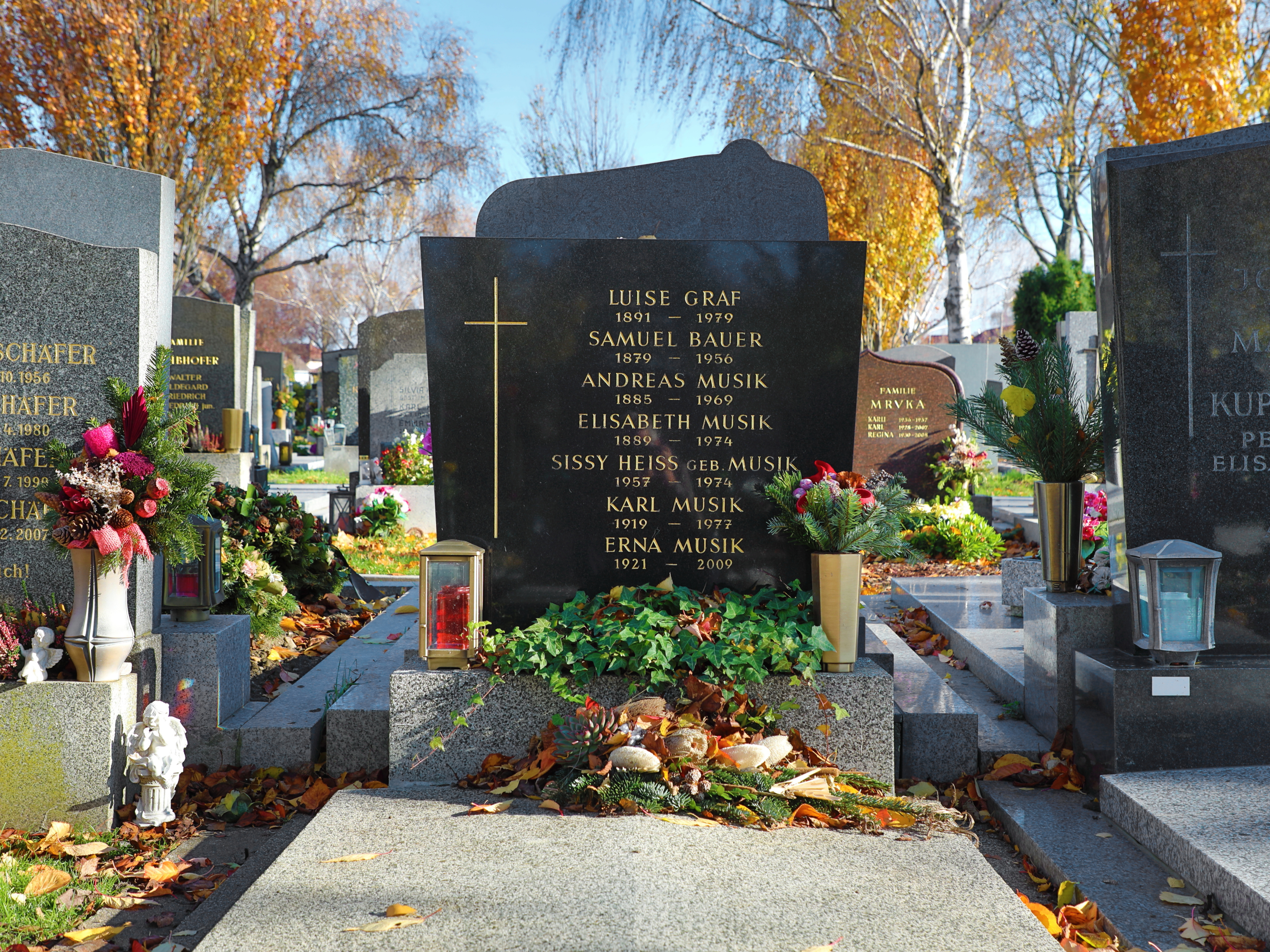
Grave of Erna Musik

During her final years she was constrained by illness and left her apartment only very rarely. Erna Musik died in Vienna a few weeks short of what would have been her eighty-eighth birthday.

Her body was buried in the Stammersdorf main cemetery. (Note: The location of her grave is given as Group 23, Row 7, Grave number 21.)

== Recognition and celebration ==
- Honorary presidency of the Association of Socialist Freedom Fighters
- Golden decoration of honour of the City of Vienna
- Golden decoration of honour for services to the Republic of Austria
- Decoration for Services to the Liberation of Austria
