= Lippitsch =

Lippitsch Lipič
- Ortsteil of Radibor
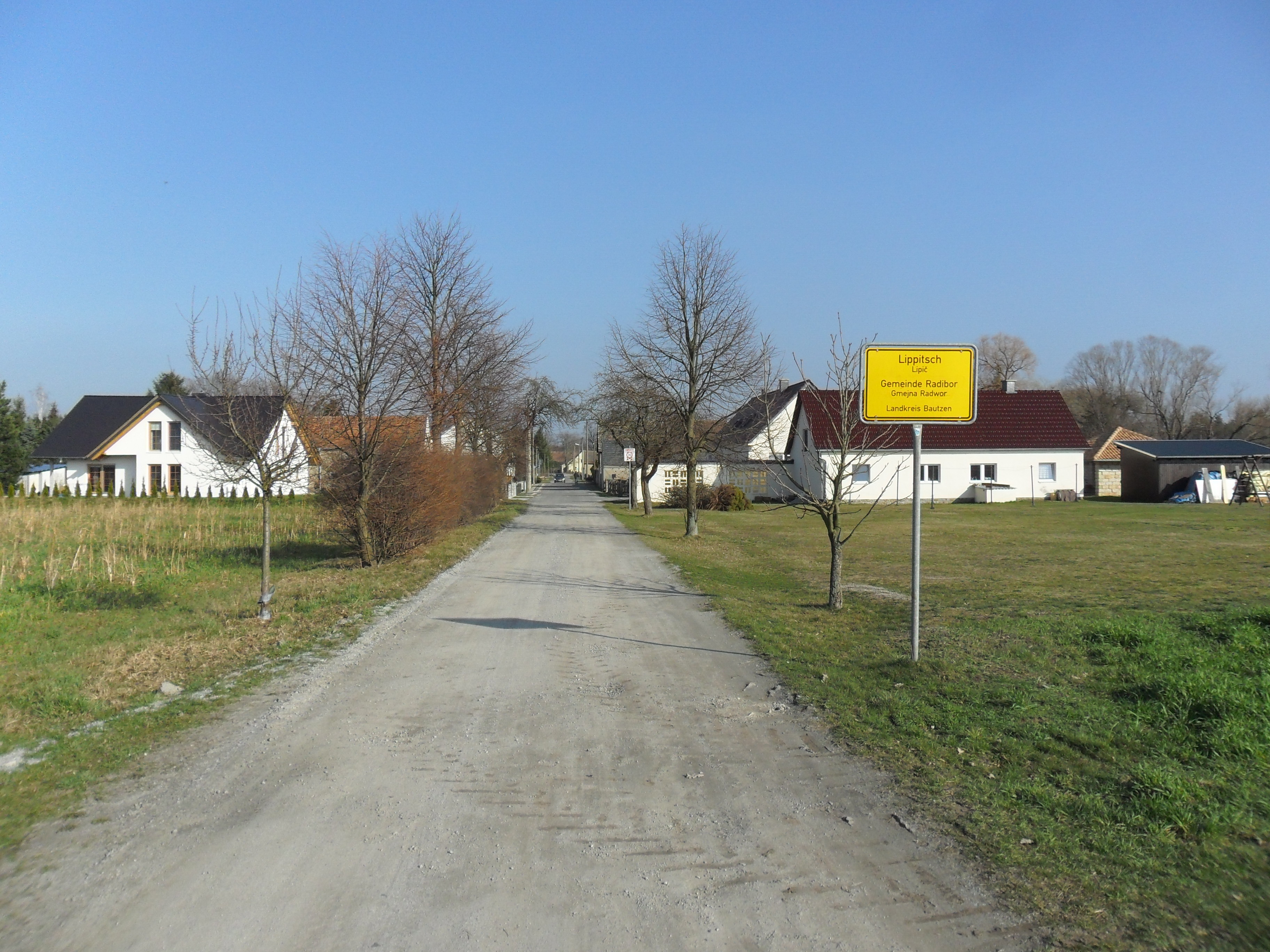
- Entrance to the village
- Interactive map of Lippitsch
- Location within Germany Location within Saxony
- Coordinates: 51°19′N 14°26′E
- Country: Germany
- State: Saxony
- District: Bautzen
- Municipality: Radibor
- Time zone: UTC+01:00 (CET)
  - Summer (DST): UTC+02:00 (CEST)

Lippitsch (German) or Lipič (Upper Sorbian) is a village in the administrative district of Bautzen, in northeastern Saxony, in eastern Germany. It belongs to Upper Lusatia and was an independent municipality until 1977, when it was absorbed by Milkel. In 1999, it became part of the municipality Radibor. The population is 185 (2011).

The name comes from the Sorbian word, lipa for limetree. Lipič accordingly means place with a limetree.

In 1875, the village had a population of 231, 90,9% Sorbian by ethnicity.
