= Rosa Jochmann =

Austrian resistance activist, politician and Ravensbrück concentration camp survivor

- Born: 19 July 1901; Vienna Austria-Hungary
- Died: 28 January 1994 (aged 92); Vienna, Austria
- Occupations: Factory worker Union activist & official Resistance activist Politician
- Political party: SDAP/SPÖ
- Partner: Franz Rauscher (1900–1988)
- Children: none
- Parent(s): Karl Jochmann (1876–1920); Josefina _______ (1874–1915)

Rosa Jochmann (19 July 1901 – 28 January 1994) was an Austrian resistance activist and Ravensbrück concentration camp survivor who became a politician (SPÖ).

== Life ==
=== Provenance and early years ===
Rosa Jochmann was born in the 20th district of Vienna, the fourth of her parents' six children. Her father worked as an iron foundryman: her mother worked in domestic service and as a laundry worker. While she was still very young the family moved to the 11th district (Simmering Viertel), in the southeast of the city, where they lived in a succession of rented rooms until 1912 when they moved into an apartment in one of the new so-called "Krankenkassenhäusern" (social housing – literally: "sickness insurance houses") which had been built at the instigation of the socialist politician Laurenz Widholz, alongside the "Braunhubergasse" (street). She would still be living in southeast Vienna seventy years later.

Her parents had both migrated to the capital from Moravia, where her father had been active in the Social democratic movement. Her mother grew up in a Roman Catholic family. The language spoken at home was for the most part Czech. Jochmann later recalled that her father had never really learned German. He was, according to at least one source, frequently unemployed because of his reputation as a political activist. His daughter later recalled in an interview that he "was a Social Democrat who never went to church, but [the children always] had to say their prayers". The Jochmann children grew up bilingual.

When Rosa Jochmann was fourteen her mother died, aged just forty-one from multiple sclerosis (or, according to other sources, exhaustion) Jochmann later told an interviewer that she had by this time been nursing her sick mother for six years. She now became the principal carer for her two surviving younger sisters, Josefine (Peperle) and Anna (Antschi), while also looking after her father. World War I had broken out in 1914 and Rosa's brother, Karl, returned with Tuberculosis. Karl died in 1920. In his later years her father had a large red scar on his shoulder which had been inflicted with a sabre by a government official on a horse who had been policing a street protest. Rosa was with her father at the demonstration, conducted in order to press for voting rights, when her father received his injury. Like his wife, he never reached old age, dying in 1920 at around the same time as his only son.

=== Work ===
As a child it was Rosa Jochmann's ambition to become a nun and teacher, or a mother. When she was eleven, as a top student at her school, she was able to complete a typing and stenography course, which under other circumstances might have opened the way to a teaching career, but her domestic situation closed off that option. Nor would she ever become a mother. In 1915 she started work as an assistant with Victor Schmidt & Söhne, a long established Viennese manufacturer of sweets/candy. Because she was relatively young (and despite her domestic responsibilities) she earned only half as much as older workers, even though she was just as productive as they were. This gave rise to a sense of injustice which would become a theme of her later political activism. Then, because of the war, she was conscripted for work at a cable factory. Here, during a night shift, she dozed off and crushed a finger on the flywheel of a winding-drum She transferred to the Apollo candle factory (today part of Unilever), after which she ended up at the Auer gas mantle plant. Early on she became a works council member and active trades unionist. In 1920 colleagues at Auer elected her chair of the works council.

=== Political career ===
Jochmann's union activism continued, and increasingly came to embrace a wider political activism. In 1926 the head of the Chemical Workers Union, Julius Weiß, arranged for her to be a member of the first group of students at the newly established Workers' Academy ("Arbeiterhochschule") in Vienna 19 (Döbling). She was one of very few women attending the wide-ranging six-month course which she completed successfully. Topics included Applied Economics ("Nationalökonomie"), Public and Civil Law ("Staats- und Sozialrecht") and Rhetoric. Her teachers included future leaders of the Social Democratic movement in Austria, such as Otto Bauer and Karl Renner. Still aged only 25, she emerged to be appointed union secretary of the Chemical Workers Union.

Rosa Jochmann also joined the Social Democratic Party ("Sozialdemokratischen Arbeiterpartei" / SDAP) in 1926. She attended that year's party conference, at which the important new party programme was adopted, as an observer, viewing from the visitors' gallery. Very quickly, however, she moved up the party hierarchy. In 1932 she became a member of the party Women's Secretariat. In 1933, at the last party conference before the SDAP was banned, Rosa Jochmann and Helene Postranecky (1903–1995) were elected to the party national executive in succession to Adelheid Popp(1869–1939) and Therese Schlesinger (1863–1940).

=== Austrofascism ===
During the four-day February Uprising in 1934, Rosa Jochmann was installed inside the Republican Protection League headquarters at George Washington Court. From there she stenographed radio messages, updating the outside world about the progress of the fighting, and then delivering texts to Otto Bauer and Julius Deutsch in the next-door room. The insurgency collapsed after the government called in the army. On the night of 12 February 1934, Jochmann was one of those who persuaded the leader of the party, Otto Bauer, that for him to remain in Austria would be personally fatal. Bauer escaped across the border to the north, and would spend the next four years as a political exile in Brno. He instantly resigned the party leadership, but during the difficult years that followed was able to remain in frequent contact with former party comrades as an advisor and inspiration. All the individuals who had been members of the party national executive faced charges of high treason: most were arrested in the days following the armed altercation.

Directly after the February events the SDAP was expressly outlawed, in the context of a more far reaching programme of destruction by the Dollfuss government, aimed at Austria's democratic political structure. Jochmann managed to evade immediate capture and continued with – now illegal – party work while using a forged identity card as "Josefine Drechsler" (which was her younger sister's name). She was able to remain at liberty for more than half a year, and was at the centre of attempts to create an illegal successor organisation to the SDAP. On 26 February 1934 five political comrades who had not been arrested met in a private apartment in Vienna 9: Manfred Ackermann, Roman Felleis, Karl Holoubek, Rosa Jochmann und Ludwig Kostroun initially described themselves as the "national group of five" ("zentralen Fünfergruppe"), but were very soon identifying themselves as the "Central Committee of the Revolutionary Socialists" ("Zentralkomitee der Revolutionären Sozialisten"). The Revolutionary Socialist movement concentrated on building opposition to the Austrofascist régime. Jochmann addressed illegal rallies, participated in "conferences and actions" and engaged in the distribution of printed material. Armed with her sister's identity card, she made repeated visits to the Czechoslovak frontier near Brno, from where she smuggled leaflets and bundles of the illegal "Arbeiterzeitung" ("Workers' Newspaper") into Austria.

There was a widespread perception that the Austrofascist régime would not last, and Revolutionary Socialist political activity, though illegal, was still relatively brazen during the middle part of 1934. Leaflets were distributed and stickers applied to walls and street furniture. There were even public meetings. A commemorative rally was scheduled for 15 July 1934 at the Predigtstuhl Meadows in the Wienerwald (Vienna Woods), just outside the city. Jochmann was due to speak. As she began to address several hundred people, the local police, backed up by the gendarmerie, stormed the event. Two people were shot. "More gendarmes turned up and our people tried to defend themselves. Shots were fired and many people fled. You heard screaming and moaning."

=== Arrest ===
Rosa Jochmann finally faced trial in April 1935. A press report summarized the charges.

- "Rosa Jochmann, the former member of the national executive of the SDAP, appeared before the magistrate's court, presided over by Dr. Oslo, to answer charges of breaching the peace and violating §30 of the Press Law. The public prosecutor was Dr. Erwin Scheibert.

Rosa Jochmann is indicted as follows: After the collapse of the February uprising, the accused has repeatedly been present in Vienna and Lower Austria without her presence being registered. In defiance of the dissolution and official ban in respect of the Social Democratic Party after February 1934, opposition against the government has been pursued by the "Revolutionary Socialist" organisation with the ultimate objective of creating the Proletarian Dictatorship
The organisation is led by a Central Committee, the "tens of thousands". In pursuit of its objectives the Central Committee, which also contains members of the Communist Party, issued the following instruction: Members of the revolutionary organisations should register as members of the Patriotic Front in the greatest possible numbers ... (the charge then spells out the alleged role of Rosa Jochmann within the organisation and her involvement in transporting illegal political printed materials")

- "Vor einem Schöffensenat unter dem Vorsitz des Oberlandesgerichtsrates Dr. Osio hatte sich gestern das ehemalige Mitglied des Sozialdemokratischen Parteivorstandes, die frühere Nationalrätin Rosa Jochmann, wegen Verbrechens der Störung der öffentlichen Ruhe und Übertretung nach § 30, Preßgesetz, zu verantworten. Der Vertreter der öffentlichen Anklage war Staatsanwalt Dr. Erwin Scheibert.

Die Anklage gegen Rosa Jochmann führt folgendes aus: Die Angeklagte hat sich nach dem Zusammenbruch des Februaraufstandes wiederholt in Wien und in Niederösterreich unangemeldet aufgehalten. Trotz der Auflösung und des behördlichen Verbots der Sozialdemokratischen Partei nach dem Februar 1934 wurde von der Organisation der „Revolutionären Sozialisten“ der Kampf gegen die Regierung mit dem Ziele der endgültigen Aufrichtung der proletarischen Diktatur fortgesetzt."
Diese Organisation stand unter der Leitung eines Zentralkomitees: die Zehnerscharen. Zur Erreichung seines Zweckes gab das Zentralkomitee, in dem sich auch Vertreter der Kommunistischen Partei befanden, folgende Weisung: Die Mitglieder der revolutionären Organisationen sollten in möglichst großer Zahl ihren Beitritt zur Vaterländischen Front anmelden. (…) Die Anklage beschäftigt sich dann weiter mit der Tätigkeit der Angeklagten Rosa Jochmann innerhalb der Organisation. Die Angeklagte war ebenfalls Mitglied einer Zehnerschar und trug als solches die Nummer 6. Am 28. August vergangenen Jahres hat sie illegale Druckschriften der revolutionären Sozialisten von Wien nach Baden gebracht (…)."

On 30 August 1934, Rosa Jochmann arrived at the railway station in Wiener Neustadt carrying two briefcases. She was observed by a police informer as she approached a newspaper kiosk. She was intending to hand over Revolutionary Socialist political leaflets for onward distribution. Police appeared as she reached the kiosk. They arrested Jochmann, confiscated the leaflets and searched the kiosk." Jochmann was detained at Wiener Neustadt for three months before the prosecutor's office ordered that she be transferred back to Vienna, where she was held in investigative detention at the Rossauer Lände jail (known to inmates as the "Liesl") on behalf of the Vienna district court. By 22 November 1935, Rosa Jochmann would have spent fifteen months in jail, most of which comprised pre-trial detention.

Records survive of her interrogation sessions, which, when she was first incarcerated, often took place several times per day over a succession of days. The investigators were trying to reconstruct the events of the February Uprising, the identities of those involved and their connections with the Republican Protection League. It was not till April 1935 that she was convicted and sentenced. She was guilty of carrying illegal goods – the politically printed matter – which was a violation of Press Law. More serious convictions resulted from the police search of the newspaper kiosk at the railway station. The prosecution asserted that evidence had been found for the training of the so-called "tens of thousands", a quasi-military structure created to engage in illegal activities, and that Jochmann had been serving as a messenger on behalf of the illegal organisation. Further evidence adduced against her involved records of financial transfers as well as a travel card issued by the Lower-Austria rail service, which (correctly) included a photograph of Rosa Jochmann but was issued (incorrectly) in the name of her sister, Josefine Drechsler.

Her release, which came in November 1935, did little to reduce the pressure on her. She devoted the next few months to looking after friends awaiting their own trials. Comrades who faced trial in Vienna in March 1936 included Bruno Kreisky and Franz Jonas, along with Maria Emhart and Jochmann's own partner, the future secretary of state Franz Rauscher.

=== Re-arrest ===
On 12 March 1938 German troops marched into Austria. Newsreels showing Austrian crowds cheering the invading columns of soldiers were quickly distributed round the world, but many Austrians, especially those who had been involved in opposition to the Austrofascist régime, had little reason to celebrate Austria's incorporation into an enlarged German state under the control of a post democratic Nazi government. Rosa Jochmann was arrested and faced interrogation later that same month, but was released after two days. Her high-profile record of Social-Democrat activism meant that she remained in obvious danger, but she rejected the opportunity to flee the country. She remained in Vienna and took work with a Jewish-owned textiles company in Vienna's central Salzgries district.

Prisoners were subjected to mistreatment and torture from the outset. Women were also subjected to sexual violence from the Nazi paramilitaries (SS). Rosa Jochmann later recalled her arrival at the concentration camp:

- "We were taken to the baths: all our things were taken from us. Then of course we had to parade naked in front of the camp physicians and for the delight of the SS men who had been called in. I will say nothing about their conversations, because those things are not to be repeated."
- "Wir wurden ins Bad gebracht, all unsere Sachen wurden uns weggenommen, dann mussten wir natürlich nackt einen Parademarsch vor den anwesenden Aerzten und der zum Spass hinzugezogenen SS machen. Ueber den Inhalt des Gespraeches das sich daraufhin ergab will ich schweigen, denn er ist nicht wiederzugeben."
Rosa Jochmann

Rosa Jochmann was re-arrested on 22 August 1939. She was held by the Gestapo in Vienna for more than half a year. This period of uncertainty ended in March 1940 when she was marked out for "protective custody" and placed on a train to Germany. She was accompanied by the ominous note on her detention order "Rückkehr unerwünscht" (loosely "not to be sent back"). On 21 March 1940 she was delivered to the concentration camp at Ravensbrück, roughly an hour to the north of Berlin for those able to make the journey by car. Here she survived till liberation came in the early summer of 1945.

=== Ravensbrück ===
Ravensbrück concentration camp held approximately 132,000 women and children, 20,000 men and 1,000 "female young people", who came, according to registration data, from more than forty nations. Tens of thousands would be murdered or would die from hunger and illness. In the camp developed a close practical comradeship and personal friendship with her political soul-mate, the resistance activist (who faced additional dangers because the authorities had classified her as a half-Jew) Erna Raus (later. Erna Musik). Through the intervention of a fellow inmate, the economist-politician Käthe Leichter, Rosa Jochmann found herself appointed a "block senior" in the so-called "politicals'" block till 1943. Appointing inmates to undertake administrative roles gave the camp guards more time for their own priorities. The position was one of privilege but also of heightened political risk. It could provide opportunities to mediate between inmates and the camp authorities, and Jochmann was sometimes able to get together with others in order to arrange extra food rations or medication in cases of exceptional need. Jochmann seems to have managed to find in herself a greater level of physical and mental strength than many. But she still had to stand idly by as her friend and political soulmate Käthe Leichter was taken away to Auschwitz to be murdered.

As a block senior, she took a particular interest in looking after children in ways that increased their chances of surviving the camp. Testimony to that appeared at the end of her life in the form of numerous written expressions of appreciation from those whom she had helped. She also sustained a number of "pen pal" friendships with people she had known at Ravensbrück. Darker aspects of her role included the two times she was locked up in the so-called "bunker", the first time for a few weeks and the second time for over six months. A fellow inmate, whom other camp survivors would later identify as a "spy", had denounced her to the Nazi paramilitaries in charge.

- "Most of those forced into the concentration camp went straight home in '45. Not me. There were so many ill people there, I felt obliged to help. Then the Russians moved into the camp. But they did not rape us: they gave us everything there was – food etc. They were always helpful. But they were aloof. They gave us everything, were decent, but also kept their distance from us. And then we came out into this destroyed world...."
- "Die meisten im KZ haben '45 gleich nach Hause gedrängt. Ich nicht. Es waren so viele Kranke dort, und ich habe mich verpflichtet gefühlt zu helfen. Dann haben die Russen ja das Lager mit Beschlag belegt. Aber die haben uns nicht vergewaltigt, die haben uns alles gegeben, was es nur gegeben hat, an Lebensmitteln usw. Die haben auch immer mich geholt. Aber die waren distanziert zu uns. Die haben uns alles gegeben, waren anständig, aber sie waren zu uns distanziert. Und dann sind wir hinaus und haben diese zerstörte Welt gesehen ..."
Rosa Jochmann

After the camp was liberated by Soviet forces in April 1945, Rosa Jochmann was one of many who stayed on for several weeks to help care for survivors. From Austria, there came no evidence of any official offer to return the Austrian Ravensbrück survivors across the mountains back to their home country. Jochmann therefore travelled to Vienna with the communist Friederike "Friedl" Sinclair and negotiated the provision of transport with the Soviet military commander there. She then returned to the camp and helped organise the repatriation. Travelling home with fellow survivors, she celebrated her forty-fourth birthday.

In Vienna, her apartment had been bombed out. She was offered an Aryanised Jewish villa in Vienna 19 (Döbling) from which the Nazi occupants had fled, but she rejected the offer in no uncertain terms, and for some years was happy to live in a single rented room.

=== After the war ===
Jochmann resumed her political life as a left-wing member of the SPÖ (as the Social Democratic Party was now rebranded). The victorious allied powers had agreed between themselves back in 1943 that Austria should again be separated from Germany as it had been before 1938. Austria's first postwar general election was conducted on 25 November 1945 across Vienna and four military occupation zones into which the rest of the country had been divided. When the new parliamentarians took their seats on 19 December 1945 Rosa Jochmann was among them, a member of the National Council (lower house of the Austrian parliament). She was again a member of the party executive between 1956 and 1967 and deputy chair of the party. She was also, between 1959 and 1967, chair of the SPÖ women ("Vorsitzende der SPÖ-Frauen").

In 1967, now aged 66, Rosa Jochmann retired from all but one of her political offices. The exception was her role as chair of the "Bund sozialistischer Freiheitskämpfer" ("Association of Socialist Freedom Fighters"), which consists of former members of the old Revolutionary Socialists.

=== Death and burial ===
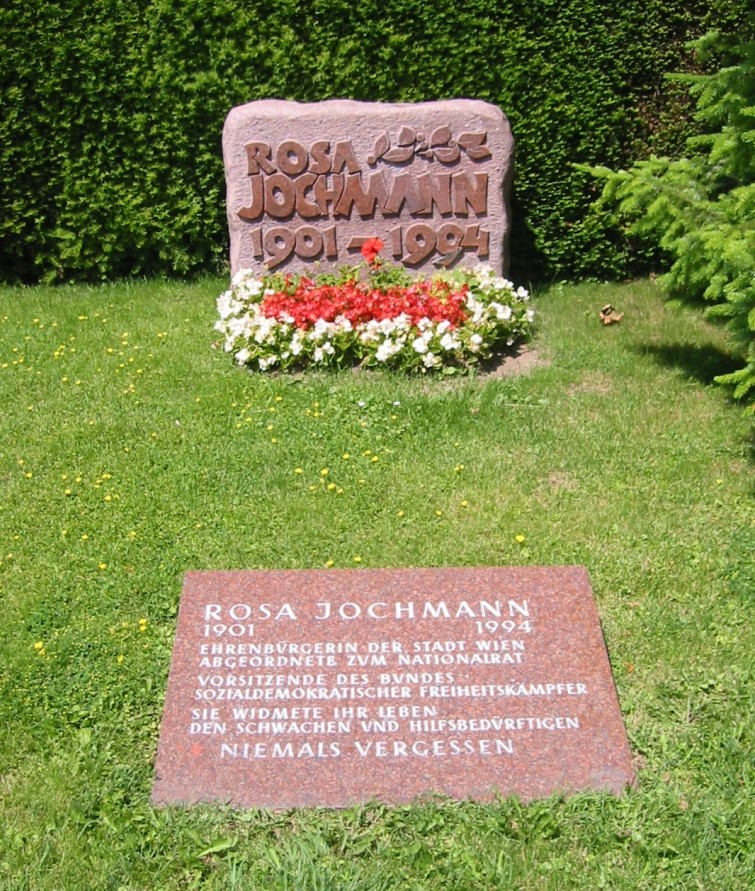
Rosa Jochmann 1901 – 1994

Rosa Jochmann died following a heart attack at the Hanusch Hospital in Vienna on 28 January 1994.

Her body was buried in Vienna's (misleadingly named) Central Cemetery: Group 14C, Number 1A. Her gravestone and adjacent memorial tablet were designed by Leopold Grausam.

== Mission ==
Jochmann warned throughout her life against Far-right extremism and Antisemitism. She presented countless lectures and communicated her own contemporary experiences and insights, addressing schools and as a conference speaker, both in Austria and abroad. Her final high-profile attendance was at the 1993 Lichtermeer mass-event, still (in 2018) the largest demonstration in postwar Austria, held in opposition to anti-foreigner "Austrian First" populism of the Freedom Party. She spoke out, warning one last time against Far-right extremism and Antisemitism.

== Public recognition and celebration ==
Rosa Jochmann was one of the prominent Ravensbrück concentration camp inmates who was publicly commemorated during the liberation celebrations at the Ravensbrück National Memorial of the German Democratic Republic (GDR), like Martha Desrumaux, Yevgenia Klemm, Antonina Nikiforova, Mela Ernst, Katja Niederkirchner, Rosa Thälmann, Olga Benário Prestes, Olga Körner, Minna Villain, and Maria Grollmuß.

Rosa Jochmann was awarded Honorary citizenship ("Ehrenbürgerrecht") of Vienna in 1981.

In 1995, the year following her death, a street in the 11th district (Simmering Viertel) of Vienna was renamed, "Rosa-Jochmann-Ring" in celebration of her life and contribution. The nearby Rosa Jochmann school and Rosa Jochmann Court residential development have also, subsequently, been renamed in her honour. In the adjacent Leopoldstadt quarter the naming of the Rosa Jochmann Park also honours her memory.

In 2004, a newspaper poll reported by the Kurier (Vienna-based newspaper) identified Rosa Jochmann as one of the fifty most important Austrians of the last fifty years.
