= Fritz Pröll =

German resistance member (1915–1944)

Fritz Pröll

Friedrich Wilhelm Pröll (23 April 1915 – 22 November 1944), also known as Fritz Pröll, was a resistance fighter against the Nazi regime.

== Life ==
Friedrich Wilhelm Pröll was born on 23 April 1915 in Augsburg. The 19-year-old metalworker Fritz Pröll joined Augsburg's biggest resistance group in 1934, the Red Help (Rote Hilfe). Owing to a leaflet distribution campaign in 1935, he was denounced. Before the court Fritz frankly admitted his guilt. From 29 August 1935 he found himself serving a three-year sentence at Landsberg Prison in "protective custody" for "conspiracy to commit high treason". During his three-year solitary confinement (then the maximum penalty for youths), he was constantly in the penal company. On 25 January 1939 he was transferred to Buchenwald concentration camp. There he met his brother Josef, who was likewise interned at Buchenwald.

On 14 March 1942 came his transfer to Natzweiler-Struthof concentration camp. There he fell deeply in love for the first time, with a Jewish internee, who probably later perished.

Sometime after 17 December 1943 Fritz Pröll and his brother were brought back to Buchenwald concentration camp. While the resistance managed to keep his brother back in Buchenwald, Fritz was shifted on 1 November 1944 to the notorious Mittelbau-Dora concentration camp near Nordhausen in the Harz.

In underground shelters where the water reached the walls, the daylight never came in, and the crashing and dust from constant explosions made life hell, worked tens of thousands from all over Europe in drudgery to produce Hitler's "wonder weapons", the V1 and V2. Wernher von Braun's career began here, before he became a rocket specialist in the United States after the war.

There, Pröll also met the resistance fighters Albert Kuntz, Georg Thomas, Ludwig Szymczak, Otto Runki, Christian Behan, Heinz Schneider, the social democrat August Kroneberg, the Czechoslovak doctor and communist Jan Čespiva, the Soviet flight lieutenant Yelovoy from Odesa who was at Dora under the false name Simeon Grinko, and also Polish, French, and Dutch resistance fighters.

== Sabotage and terror in the camps ==
The unarmed, half-starved prisoners managed to thwart Hitler's wonder weapon plan. In one third of the rockets sent off in 1944, the mechanisms failed. Out of all the 10,800 V2 rockets that were deployed, more than half blew up while still aloft. The SS Oberscharführer Sander and Colonel Eichhorn were specially deployed to arrest the suspected sabotage group. The camp was covered with a system of spies. When on 18 November 1944 the Wehrmacht sent two whole trainloads of rockets back marked "Unusable – Sabotage", the fascist terror struck hard. Dozens of prisoners who were suspected of taking part in the sabotage were tortured and hanged. Onto beams between two cranes ropes with nooses were fastened, and twelve, fifteen, twenty people were hanged on them at once, strangled once the cranes lifted them up high.

Fritz Pröll busied himself during his long detention with medicine, thus enabling him to help save many people's lives at Dora. Now, however, he had to use his knowledge so that there would be no danger of his betraying his fellow fighters under torture. In the end, on 22 November 1944, he killed himself with a poison syringe. Fritz Pröll was only 29 years old; he had spent 9½ of those years locked up in prisons and concentration camps.

== Since the war ==
A school class from the Paul-Klee-Gymnasium in Gersthofen did an Internet project in 2001 on, among other things, the Pröll family's life. They ran into unforeseen difficulties. The mayor refused to allow the students access to the archives. Access could only be gained by court order.

One of the Pröll family has sought to change the street name Wernher von Braun Straße in Gersthofen to Fritz Pröll Straße, but it has not come about yet. The Town of Gersthofen justified its refusal to change the name arguing that there was a longstanding policy of naming streets in any particular part of town thematically. Following this policy, and to redress any oversight, the streets in a new neighbourhood are to be named after resistance fighters.

== Literature ==
- Gernot Römer: Für die Vergessenen : KZ-Aussenlager in Schwaben; Schwaben in Konzentrationslagern. - Augsburg : Presse-Dr., 1984
