= Einsiedel =

Einsiedel or von Einsiedel is a German surname. Notable people with the surname include:

- Albert von Einsiedel (1917–1999), Filipino sports shooter
- Heinrich Graf von Einsiedel (1921–2007), German fighter pilot
- John Einsiedel (born 1954), Australian footballer
- Kurt Einsiedel (1907–1960), German cyclist
- Orlando von Einsiedel (born 1980), British film director
