= Maria Grollmuß =

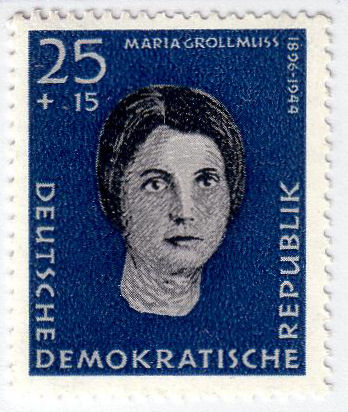
Maria Grollmuß on a stamp (1959)

Maria Karoline Elisabeth Grollmuß (Sorbian: Marja Grólmusec) (April 24, 1896, in Leipzig – August 6, 1944, in Ravensbrück) was a Catholic Sorbian publicist and a socialist resistance member against the Nazi government.

== Biography ==
Maria Grollmuß was born on April 24, 1896, to principal and linguist Dr. Johannes Grollmuß (Sorbian: Jan Grólmus) in Leipzig. After having finished her formation at Gaudigsches Lehrerinnenseminar in Leipzig in 1917, she shortly worked as an elementary school teacher at Bürgerschule Leipzig-Reudnitz before studying linguistics and history in Berlin and Leipzig. She graduated in 1928, earning a PhD for her thesis Joseph Görres und die Demokratie ('Joesph Görres and Democracy'). While studying, she was a member of the Windhorstbund at first, and later, she also became a member of the Socialist Students Union (Sozialistischer Studentenbund).

Maria Grollmuß was especially interested in political journalism. Accordingly, she wrote various articles for Rhein-Mainische Volkszeitung, a newspaper close to the left wing of Zentrumspartei, and for the magazine of the Catholic youth movement "Quickborn" called Die Schildgenossen, initiated by Romano Guardini.

While she changed party various times, her political focus was always social and leftist politics. She started as a member of SPD in 1927 and left the party to join KPD in 1929. She was excluded from KPD due to her opposition to forming separate communist trade unions, so she joined the Kommunistischen Partei-Opposition, whose minority wing she belonged to, together with Paul Frölich and Jacob Walcher. They left the party in 1932 to join Sozialistischen Arbeiterpartei Deutschlands (SAPD).

After the NSDAP took over in, she continued her political activity illegally. In close cooperation with the Arbeitskreis Revolutionärer Sozialisten, she supported political prisoners, transported illegal literature and helped endangered comrades to escape to Czechoslovakia. She operated from the village of Radibor in Upper Lusatia, her father's place of birth. She was in contact with resistance groups of the SPD, KPD, SAPD and the Austrian socialist Otto Bauer.

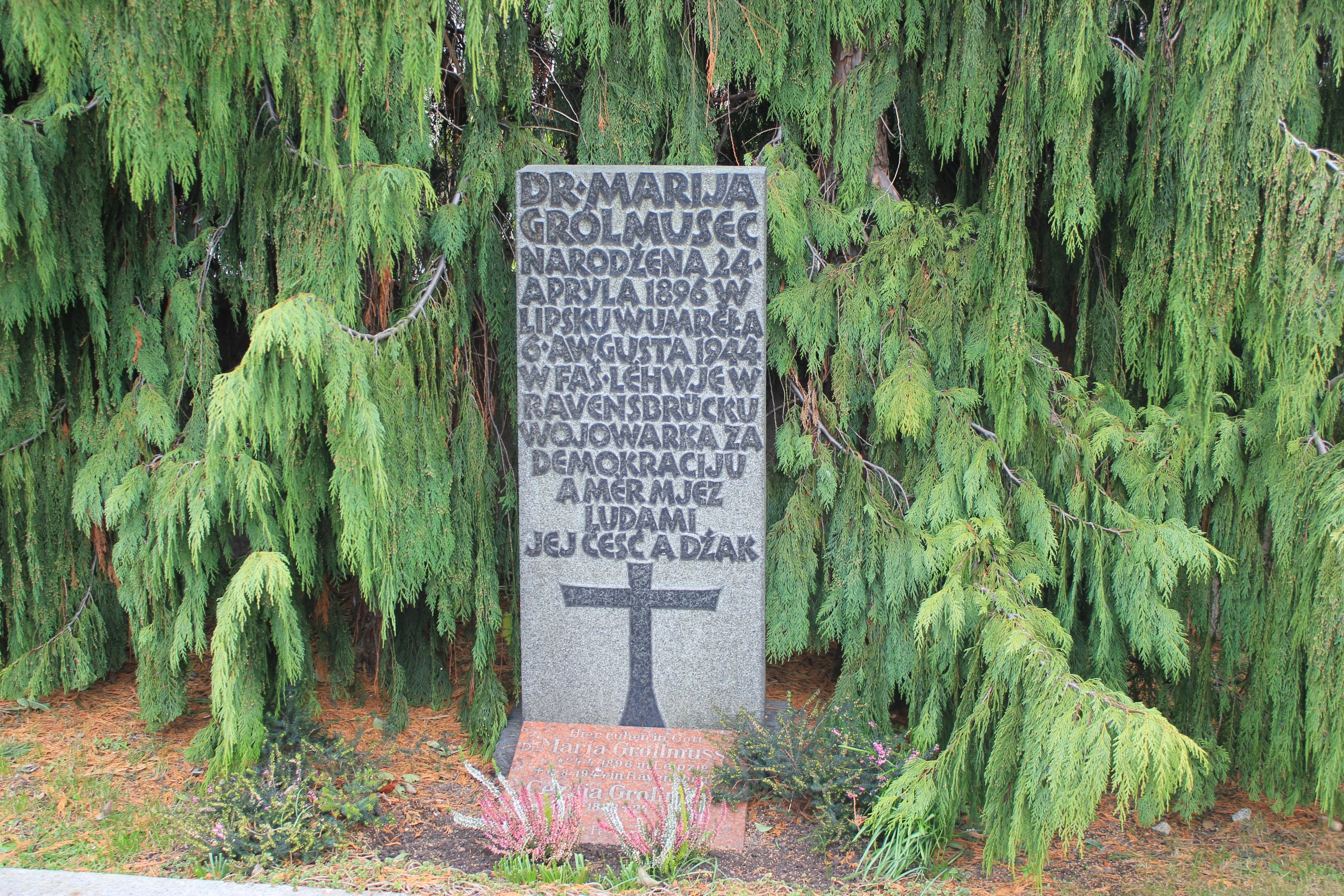
Grollmuß' grave at Radibor Cemetery

She was denounced to the German authorities and on November 7, 1934, she was arrested together with Hermann Reinmuth. At first, she was imprisoned in Dresden. She was sentenced to six years of prison by the Volksgerichtshof on November 23, 1935 (Reinmuth got seven years) and sent to Waldheim prison. During her imprisonment, she turned to Catholic spirituality. The Nazi government offered her freedom and cancer therapy if she agreed to spy for them in the Sorbian resistance movement once having served her term. She refused. Therefore, she was sent to Ravensbrück concentration camp. In Ravensbrück, she tried to support Polish and Czechoslovak prisoners using her language skills. She died on August 6, 1944, due to a tumor surgery conducted under undue circumstances. Her urn was buried on Radibor Cemetery.

== Honors ==
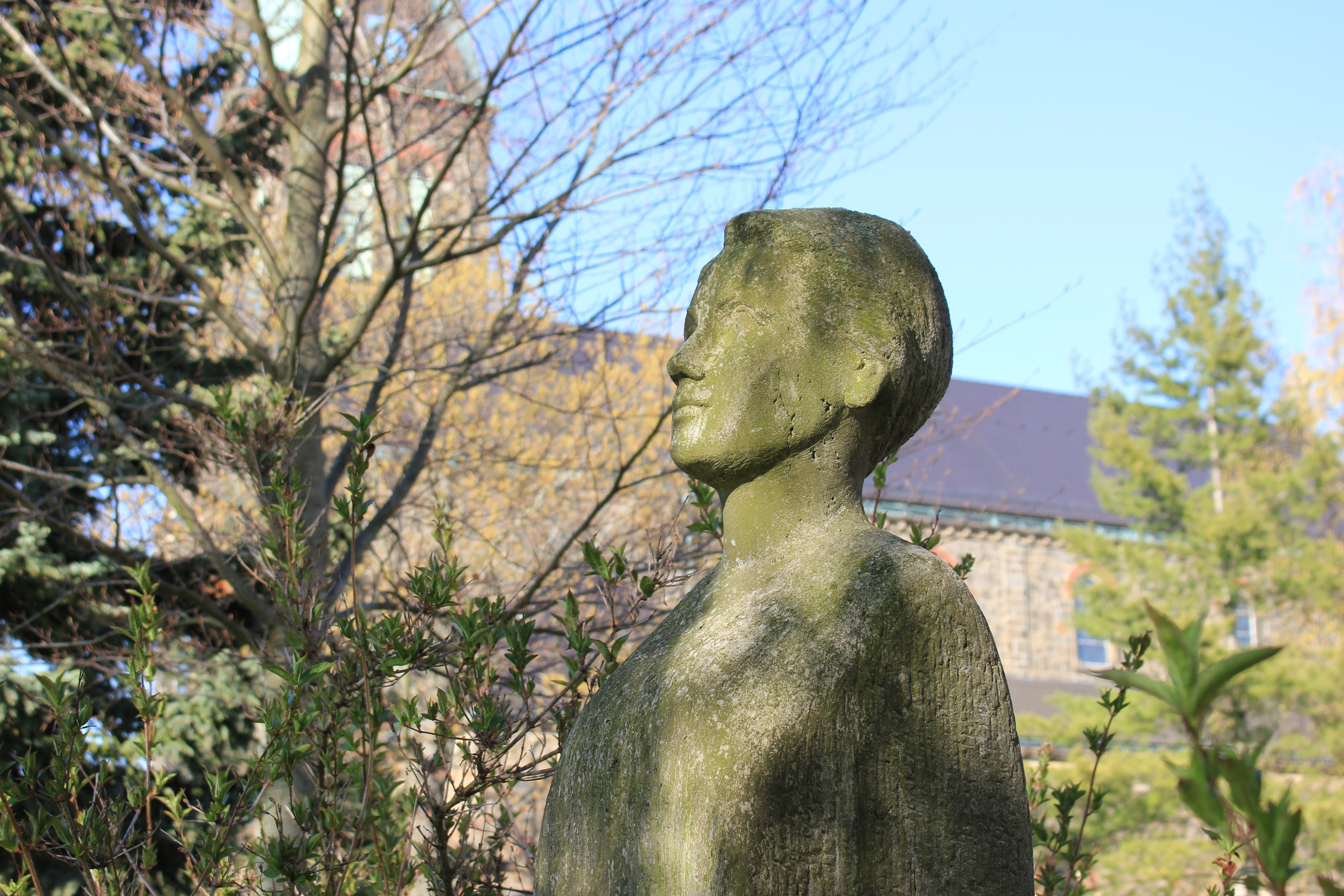
Grollmuß statue in front of a school bearing her name in Radibor

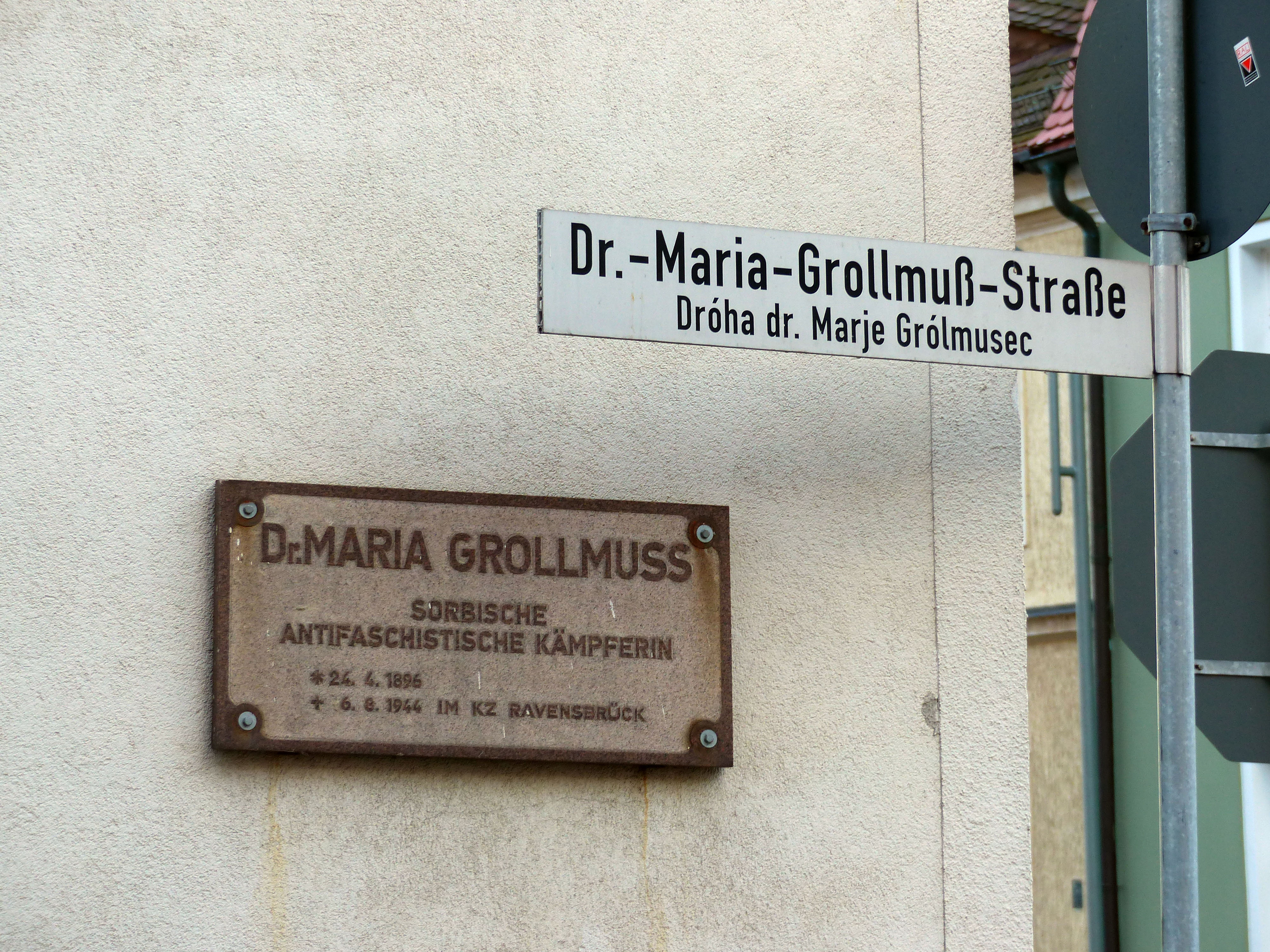
Commemorative plaque in Bautzen

She was honored by the GDR for being a Sorbian antifascist and resistance fighter. Streets in Bautzen, Hoyerswerda, Leipzig and some Lusatian towns commemorate her. In Schleife and Radibor, schools are named after her. In Radibor, there is a statue of her, too.

== Works ==
- Die Frau und die junge Demokratie. Ein Bericht über Frau, Politik und Demokratie. Frankfurt am Main. 1925.
- "Über die weibliche Form der Politik". Die Schildgenossen (1). 1926.
- "Was ist die linke Sozialdemokratie?". Gegen den Strom (4). 1931.
- Josef Görres und die Demokratie: Aufstieg und Höhepunkt - von den Anfängen bis zum Jahre 1819 (PhD thesis) (in German). Leipzig: Universität Leipzig. 1927.
