= Military School of Realengo =

- Escola Militar do Realengo
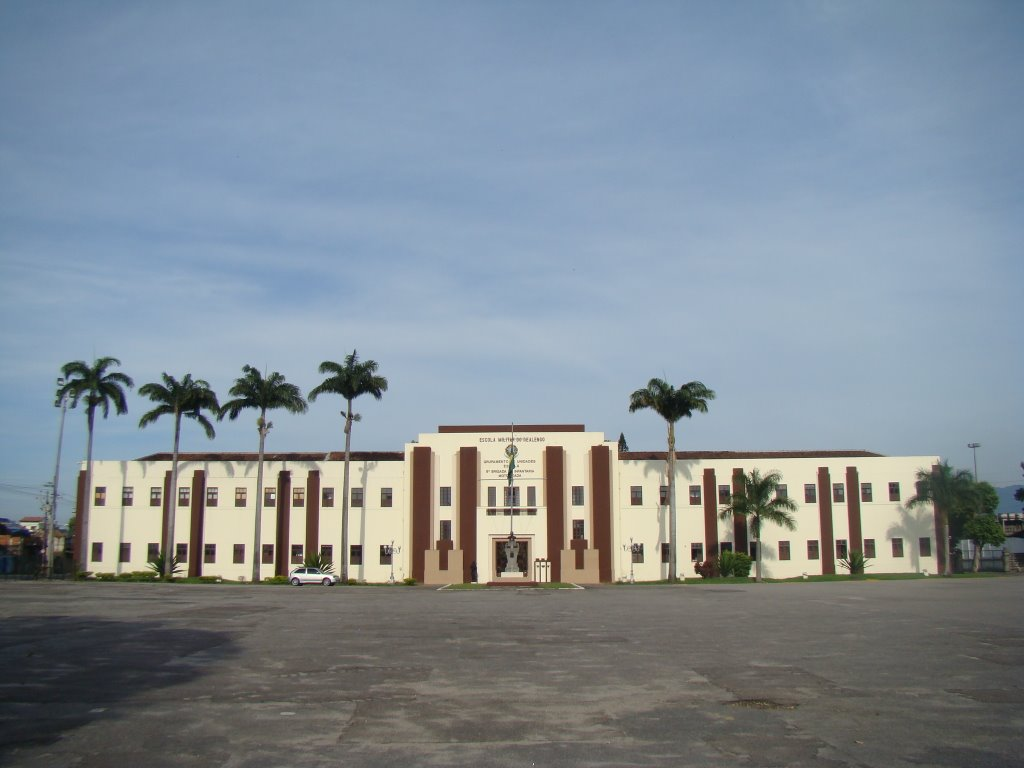

Location
- Realengo, Rio de Janeiro; Brazil
- Coordinates: de Janeiro 22.875618°S 43.432780°W

Information
- Established: 1913
- Closed: 1944
- Authority: Brazilian Army General Staff, Ministry of War, General Inspectorate of Army Education
- Enrollment: 700-800 (1920–1929)
- Affiliation: Brazilian Army
- Notable commanders: José Pessoa; Mascarenhas de Morais

The Military School of Realengo (Portuguese: Escola Militar do Realengo) was the training institution for officers of the Brazilian Army from 1913 until its transfer to Resende in 1944, originating what is now the Military Academy of Agulhas Negras (AMAN). There began the formation of the military elite, an important part of the Army reforms and the consolidation of the Brazilian republican State in its time. In three to five years its students, called cadets after 1931, became officer candidates and were assigned to troop corps. The formation was, since 1919, for platoon leaders; higher up in the military hierarchy, officers would pursue instruction at the Officer Advanced Training School and other institutions. The Artillery and Engineering courses were already operating in the Realengo neighborhood of Rio de Janeiro since 1905, after the extinction of the Military School of Praia Vermelha (EMPV); the two other courses, Infantry and Cavalry, were centralized in those facilities in 1913. Aviation Cadets had only just begun their Realengo training, concluding it at the Military Aviation School, in Campo dos Afonsos.

Its predecessor, the EMPV, had a civilian and scientific curriculum, forming politically engaged “bachelor graduates in uniform”. Neither they nor the “tarimbeiros”, the most practical officers trained in the troop, had a modern military background. The Brazilian Army's reforms at the beginning of the 20th century sought to make teaching practical, of a technical-professional nature, and train officers who were disciplined and faithful to the hierarchy; thus, training was transferred to Realengo, a suburban neighborhood, farther from the political turmoil of the federal capital and with space for military training in the field. Students continued to come largely from the urban middle class.

The new curriculum had no theoretical teaching, only practical or theoretical-practical. However, there was a lack of resources in the first years of operation, which began to change in 1918, with the hiring of the “Indigenous Mission”, a body of instructors influenced by the military reformism of the Young Turks. The students were placed in military subunits in a Student Corps, and the four branches (Infantry, Cavalry, Artillery and Engineering) had the course time equaled in three years. The students with the highest grades chose Artillery and Engineering, of a more technical nature. In 1919–1920 the building was expanded to its present size with three courtyards, but the facilities were austere. The physical labors were intense, and the discipline was rigid. Cordeiro de Farias defined this generation as the first Brazilian Army officers to receive a truly military training. Even so, students and instructors revolted in 1922, in the first episode of tenentism. The class at the end of 1919 became the core of the lieutenants' revolts, because, contrary to what the Army authorities intended, the students' environment was politicized and the insubordinate tradition of Praia Vermelha was not extinguished. Reformed teaching created a strong military identity, which considered itself superior to civilian politicians.

After 1922, the Indigenous Mission came to an end, and the French Military Mission took its place. Practical teaching was balanced with theory in the curriculum. Students were enthusiastic about the Revolution of 1930, after which command was assumed in 1931–1934 by colonel José Pessoa. He had ambitions to make the cadets a moral aristocracy. Under his command, the number of civilian applicants increased, cadet life, which had been a full-time boarding school since 1930, was regulated to the level of a total institution, while discipline was relaxed, physical reforms made the School more comfortable, symbols and rituals (historical uniforms, coat of arms, small swords and banners) that still exist today emerged and the transfer of the School to Resende was idealized. During the Communist Uprising of 1935, the School went on a campaign for the first time, supporting the constituted authorities. After 1938, the Estado Novo applied a discriminatory policy in the selection of candidates, seeking to form a homogeneous institutional elite. At the beginning of the 1940s, Realengo cadets achieved a prestige in society that did not exist at AMAN decades later. The officers trained in 1913–1944, the “Realengo generation”, had a sense of identity with the Army and its ranks, and many would have long careers of political involvement and holding public office. The generals responsible for the 1964 Brazilian coup d'état trained there in the late 1910s and 1920s, and the presidents of the Brazilian military dictatorship (1964–1985) were alumni.

== Background ==
=== Brazilian military teaching before 1913 ===
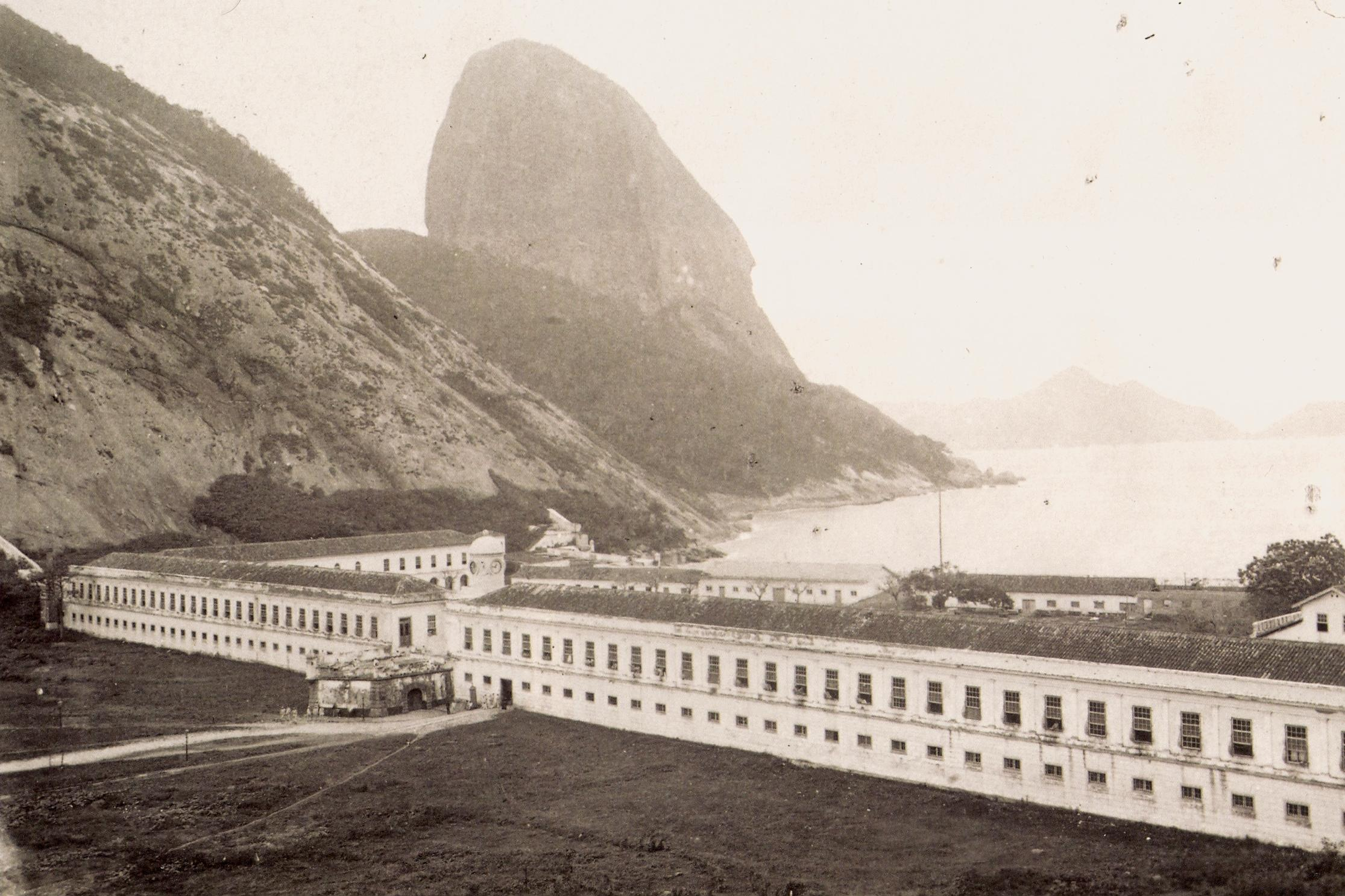
The old Military School of Praia Vermelha in 1888

Since 1898 the only source of officers for the Brazilian Army was the Military School of Brazil, known in historiography as the Military School of Praia Vermelha (EMPV); the two other schools present at the end of the Brazilian Empire, in Fortaleza and Porto Alegre, were closed. There were preparatory schools for Praia Vermelha in Realengo and Rio Pardo. The EMPV was closed after it rebelled during the Vaccine Revolt of 1904. To remove new students from the political turmoil located in downtown Rio de Janeiro, teaching was dispersed to the War School in Porto Alegre, School of Application of Cavalry and Infantry, in Rio Pardo, and the Schools of Artillery and Engineering and of Application of Artillery and Engineering, in Realengo. The other schools were closed and in 1911–1913 all officer training was concentrated in Realengo. The existence of several schools far apart had required excessive expenditures, strained the administrative capacity of the Ministry of War, and prevented closer monitoring.

The curriculum at Praia Vermelha had a civilian content, favoring mathematical, physical, natural, and philosophical sciences over military practice and technique. There was no space for field combat exercises. Only the officers with less or no education lived the day-to-day life of the troops, the “tarimbeiros”. The complete training at Praia Vermelha produced “scientific” officers, “bachelors graduates in uniform”, competitors of civilian graduates for recognition in society. They were writers, bureaucrats, and politicians, but not competent campaign managers. Young officers lived under the great influence of scientism, positivism and republicanism and were engaged in politics. In 1903, Minister of War Francisco de Paula Argolo described this type of officer as “completely foreign to the true military profession, without the habit of discipline and subordination, with a pronounced tendency to argue and criticize the orders he receives, and who by all means he tries to avoid a life whose tasks he considers incompatible with his theoretical preparation and his scientific title”. Neither of the two types, experienced or "scientific", had technical and modern military training.

Since Marshal Mallet's tenure at the Ministry of War (1898–1902) there had been an effort to modernize military education, but adequate budgetary conditions only came into existence in the 1910s. The changes in education had other reforms in the Army as a context, such as the creation of a modern organic structure, the institution of compulsory military service (the Sortition Law) and the regularity of the instruction and training of troops. The Brazilian Army had performed poorly in campaigns such as Canudos (1896–1897), and there was distrust of Argentina's foreign policy. The Young Turks, junior officers who trained in the German Empire from 1906 onwards, returned to Brazil, founding the magazine A Defesa Nacional (The National Defence) and proposing broad modernizations that should begin with military instruction.

=== Realengo before 1913 ===
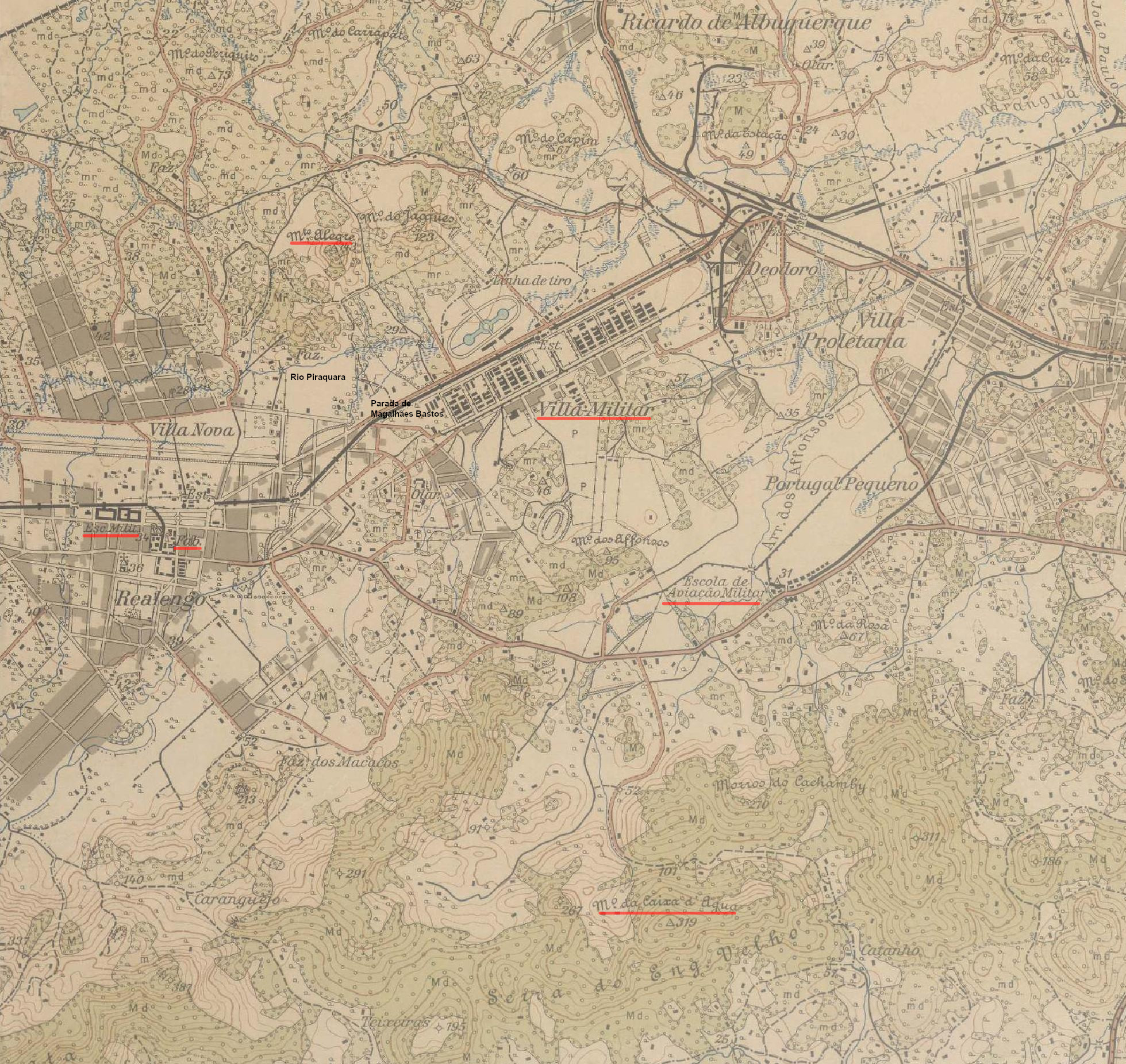
Region of the Military School and Vila Militar in 1922

Realengo has its history closely linked to the military. The Brazilian Armed Forces had been present there since 1857, the year the Campo Grande General Shooting School was founded. The Army and, later, other military corporations acquired properties through negotiations with the City Council, expropriations and purchases from former renters. Over the decades, a corridor of military areas was formed in Vila Militar, Deodoro, Realengo and Campo dos Afonsos. The region was crossed by the Central do Brasil Railway. There was vacant land to spare; urbanization only accelerated in the 1930s.

The trend was the expansion of the barracks away from the city center, following the railway network, due to real estate appreciation, the need for open spaces to train new weapons and maneuvers and the protection of war material deposits. These were the reasons for installing the School in Realengo, along with the pre-existence of military areas and the distance of students from the political contagion of the city center. In the 1930s, colonel José Pessoa negatively evaluated the location, considering it to have an unpleasant climate, monotonous landscape, vulnerable to malaria outbreaks in the surrounding swamps and, even so, too close to the city center. These considerations motivated the future transfer of the School to Resende in 1944.

The General Shooting School was transformed into the Army Practice School in the Federal Capital, in 1891; the Preparatory and Tactics School of Realengo, in 1898, and the School of Artillery and Engineering, in 1905. This last school was already similar to the Military School of Realengo, that arose from the transfer of the two other courses (Infantry and Cavalry). A School of Sergeants operated with some Practical School lodges in 1893–1896, but was unsuccessful. In 1897 the region experienced industrial expansion with the opening of the Cartridge Factory. In the 1910s, peripheral areas remained occupied by pastures, which gave way to citriculture. The urban area was of little relevance, and the water channeling was only carried out at the beginning of the following decade. The Military School, Cartridge Factory, railway station and chapel of Our Lady of Conception were the main references.

== Influences and objectives ==
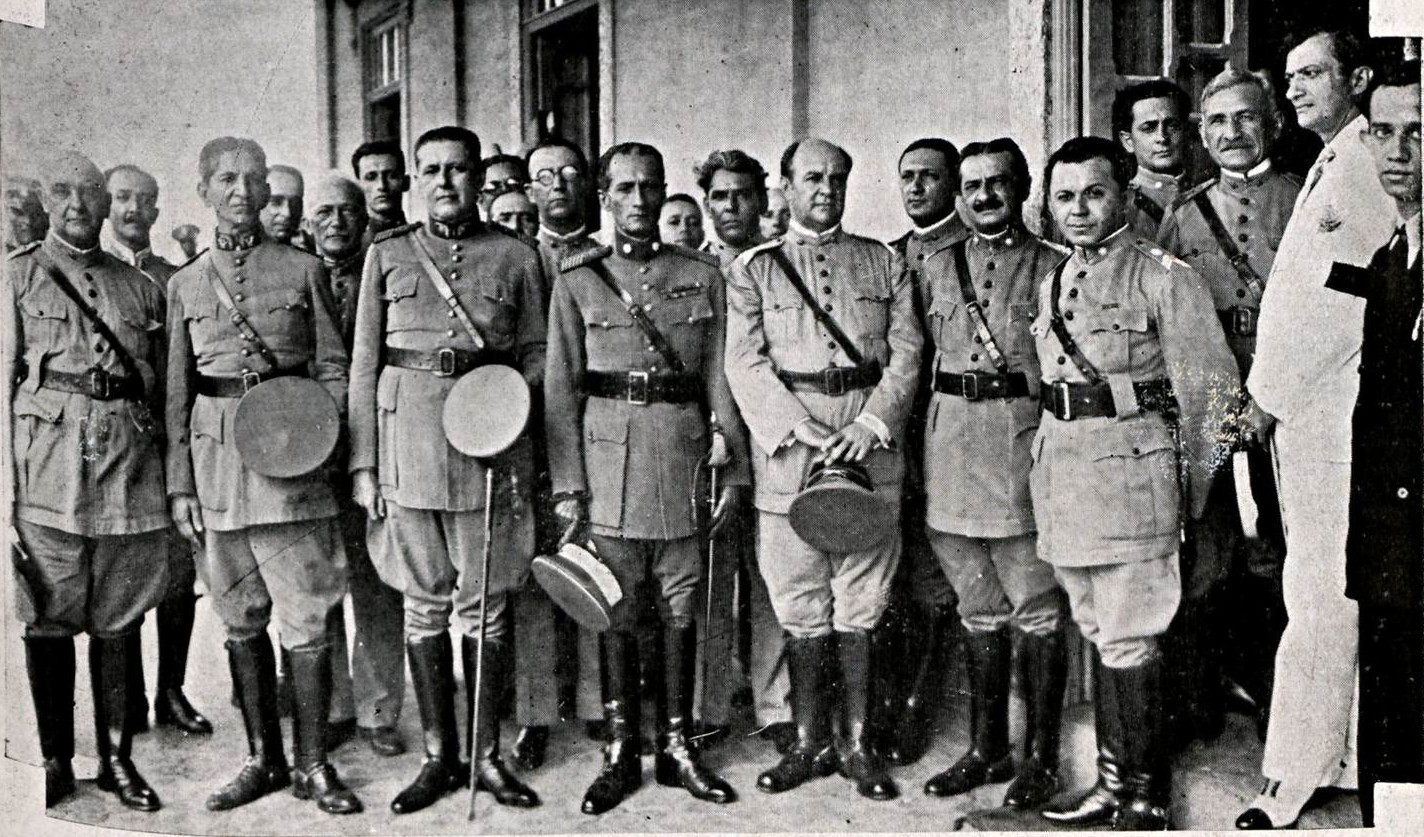
José Pessoa, in the center, upon assuming command in 1931

A officers' preparatory school is the main educational institution of an army. In the first half of the 20th century, the training of officers was important in the consolidation of the Brazilian republican State, in which the Army was an important actor. For general Pedro Aurélio de Góis Monteiro, the Military School was the “chicken that lays the golden eggs”, the cradle of the military elite. Military authorities used it as a “laboratory” to experiment with different ways of educating officers.

Since the 1905 educational reform, the main objective was to replace theoretical-scientific teaching with practical training for troop commanding officers. At the time, education in Brazil in general was moving towards a more hands-on model due to industrialization and urbanization. For the Army, the “uniformed bachelor graduates” were not suited to new weapons and means of transport and represented the risk of revolts as in 1904. However, the impact of the reforms was mitigated by the shortage of human and material resources at the Military School until 1918, reflecting the lack of equipment in the Army as a whole.

The influence of the Young Turks, already present in the elaboration of the first regulation of the School, in 1913, increased in the regulation of 1918. Several members of the group were admitted to the Brazilian Army General Staff (EME) in 1910–1914, under the leadership of José Caetano de Faria, who was then Minister of War in 1914–1918. World War I was the external factor that allowed for reforms, changing the way warfare was conducted and increasing the importance of the Army. The model was Germany. Students would learn to act and think like soldiers and then command with advanced technical and professional knowledge.

In order to remedy the deficiency of the teaching staff, in 1918 the Minister of War opened a competition with a practical test for the School's instructors, until then chosen by favoritism. The selected lieutenants and captains, under the strong influence of the Young Turks, were called the “Indigenous Mission”, as opposed to the impending French Military Mission. Of the 19 Indigenous Mission officers present in 1920, at least 11 would later rise to the rank of general. In 1919 colonel Eduardo Monteiro de Barros was appointed to the command, the first by origin as head of the troop and not as an officer of the General Staff or a former full professor. He was known for his strict application of discipline. The lack of material resources was addressed in the administration of Minister of War Pandiá Calogeras (1919–1922).

The Military School revolt in 1922, in which most of the Indigenous Mission instructors participated, brought its early end. Teaching was reformulated under the influence of the French Military Mission, hired in 1919, but until then without direct involvement in the School. The focus on professional education, considered excessive, was attenuated, and general education took place again. The education system integrated the Military School with the new Officers Improvement School (EsAO), General Staff School (EEM) and specialization schools.

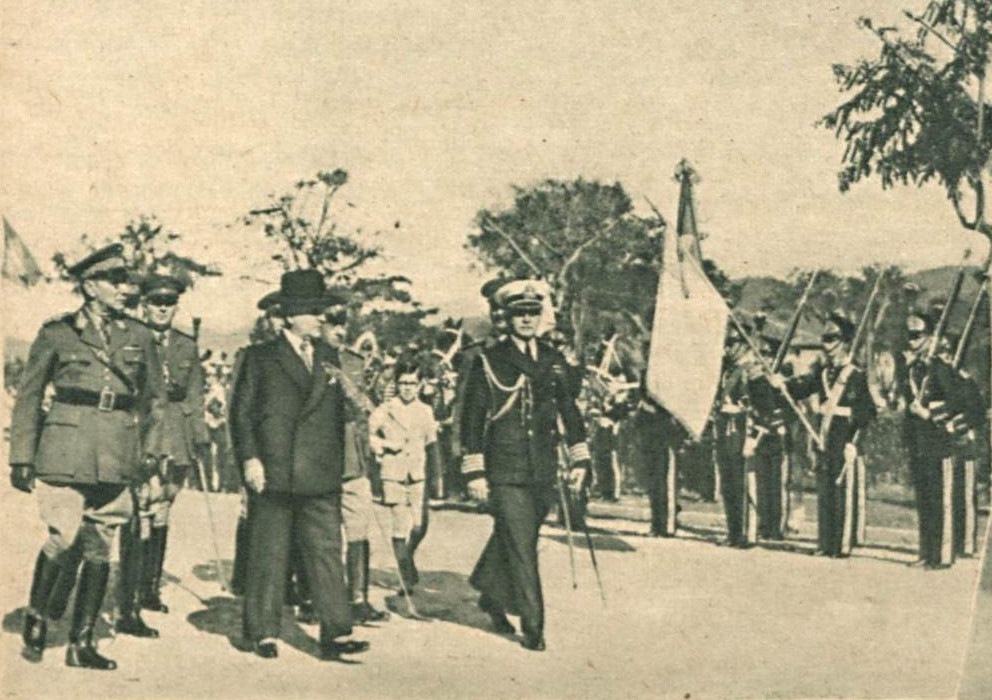
President Getúlio Vargas and his minister of war being received in the School in 1936

The Revolution of 1930 introduced the next changes. In January 1931, colonel José Pessoa was appointed to command the School. He enjoyed prestige at the top of the Army and the government of Getúlio Vargas, but divided opinions in the officer corps. His inspiration was foreign schools (West Point, Saint-Cyr and Sandhurst), and his ambition was to make the officer corps a homogeneous elite; in his words, “a true aristocracy, not the aristocracy of blood, but a physical, moral and professional aristocracy”. The command undertook structural and psychological reforms (with a psychological impact), positioned physical preparation as the basis for scientific and technical-professional training and idealized the transfer of the School to Resende. José Pessoa resigned in 1934 in protest against Minister of War Góis Monteiro, who demanded the re-enrollment of some discharged cadets and other measures he considered political interference. A few days after his departure, he also faced a student strike.

From 1933 the bureaucratic-military structure was dominated by generals Góis Monteiro and Eurico Gaspar Dutra. The changes in military education were based on the transition to a strong and authoritarian state, culminating in the implementation of the Estado Novo in 1937, and the ideological radicalization of communists and integralists. The military authorities intended to form a more homogeneous institutional elite. Cadets should be children of the “good society”, with an elite selection. The intended military type would be free of racial and ideological stigmas and with an above average moral and civic standard. Ideologically, it would be nationalist, conservative and corporatist. Education, as Dutra intended, would be in what he called an authoritarian system, in contrast to the liberal system; “social prophylaxis”, removing subversives from public activity, would also exist in military teaching institutes. The discriminatory selection of candidates, adopted from 1938, was different from José Pessoa's proposals, based on changing habits and customs.

The number of French officers in the Brazilian Army, from its peak of 36, gradually declined after 1930, with the departure of the last, and the end of the French Military Mission, with the onset of World War II; in the same period American influence begins. The last regulations (1940 and 1942) showed the influence of the American Military Mission, which had been hired in 1936, and then of Brazilian officers who had trained in the United States after the beginning of the war.

== Structure ==
=== Regulations and hierarchy ===
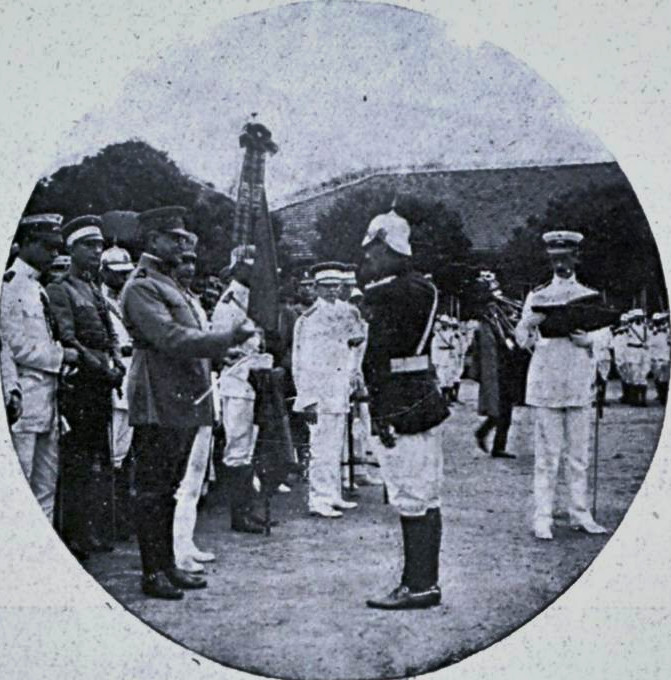
General Tasso Fragoso, head of the EME (left), at the conclusion of the course in 1925

The functioning of the School was legislated in a series of regulations. The original, from 1913, was modified in 1914. The next two regulations, in 1918 and 1919, were similar to each other. Regulations followed in 1924, 1929 and 1934, but the latter was suspended the following year. The situation remained ambiguous, with the commander applying the regulations of 1929 and 1934, until a new decree in 1940. The last regulation to be applied was of 1942. Guidelines for the content and quality of teaching were detailed but routinely ignored by School commanders and teachers.

The School was originally subordinated to the Ministry of War, passing to the General Staff of the Army in 1918, under the influence of the Young Turks, inspired by the German organization. From then on, it was subordinate to the EME in didactic matters, and to the Minister of War in administrative and disciplinary matters. In 1940, subordination for teaching and discipline passed to the General Inspectorate of Teaching of the Army, with the administration remaining with the Ministry of War through its General Secretariat. What appears in historiography as the “Military School of Realengo” and in the memoirs also as the “School of Realengo” were originally two organizations, the “Military School” and the “Practical School of the Army”. The distinction was merely functional. The command of both was exercised by the same officer, and the reports of the Minister of War from 1913 to 1917 referred to the “Military and Practical School of the Army”. After 1918, only the term “Military School” remained. Command of the School was exercised by a general; José Pessoa was an exception, taking over as colonel in 1931, but even he was a prestigious officer.

The teaching staff was made up of professors and instructors, respectively responsible for theoretical and practical content, in addition to adjuncts. Students only started to be called cadets after 1931. They were militarily organized into one or more student companies, which gave way to a Student Corps (later Cadet Corps) after 1918, with subunits of the four branches (infantry companies, grouped in a battalion, engineering company, artillery battery and cavalry squadron), (Note: Castro 2004, pp. 158–159, and Santos 2007, p. 321. See Articles 1 and 2 of the 1918 regulation and Articles 154 and 155 of the 1934 regulation.) commanded by the instructors.

Graduates received the rank of aspiring officer and were assigned to complete their training in a troop corps, being promoted to second lieutenant after a minimum period. (Note: See, for example, Articles 161 to 163 of the 1918 regulation, and 168 to 170 of the 1934 regulation.) The graduation year and placement among classmates determined the “seniority” of the officer, which defined his priority in the order of promotion and choice of vacancies in the rest of his career. A hundredth of a point difference in grade could mean transfer to a major center or a remote garrison.

The only entry route for the regular officer corps was the Military School. Since the 1920s there had been Reserve Officers' Training Center (CPOR) in some cities. The Brazilian Expeditionary Force's infantry had 266 junior officers trained in Realengo and 301 from the R2 reserve, trained in the CPOR's. After the Military School, officers could attend specialization and improvement schools. By the Military Education Law of 1928, the School was only one of twelve schools or training centers for officers. Since 1919, the idea was for Realengo to be just the first step in military education, educating just enough for the rank of captain. The next step was the Officers Improvement School.

=== Campus ===
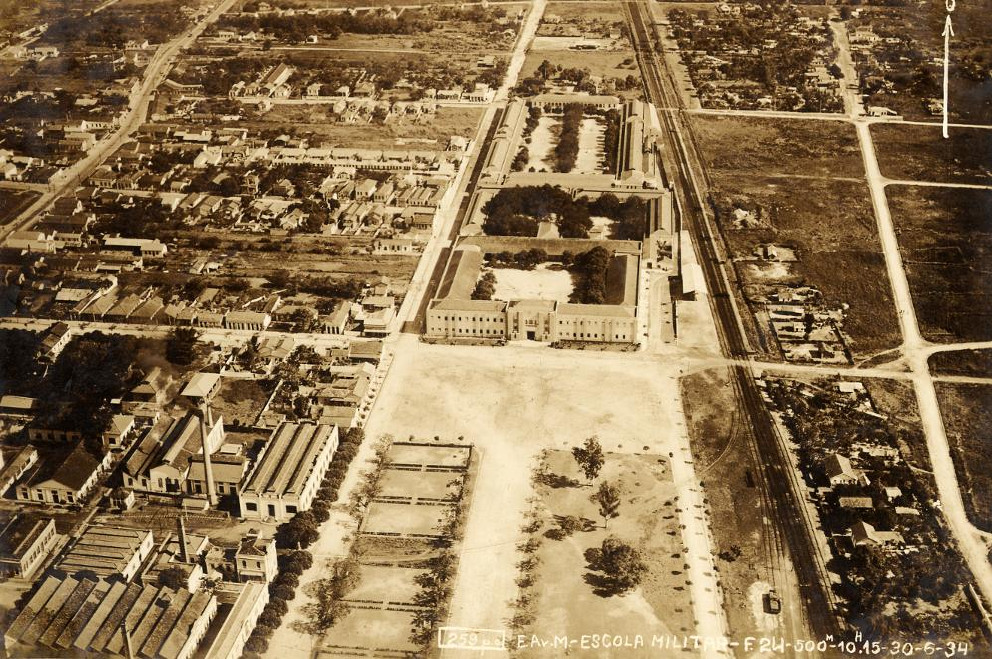
Aerial view of the building with three patios

The Military School took advantage of the facilities of the defunct Preparatory and Tactical School of Realengo. In the 1910s, the structure was too small and precarious to receive all the courses. The building was quadrilateral, with a large patio in the middle, two floors at the front and one floor at the sides and back. The courtyard was taken over by dormitories, which were still insufficient for most students, and “the classrooms were spread across the unpaved streets” outside the headquarters. The company's barracks, infirmary, pharmacy, riding stables and stalls only had electricity completed in 1914. The laboratories for theoretical-practical classes were still not in conditions of use after two years of operation. The works carried out during this period were small.

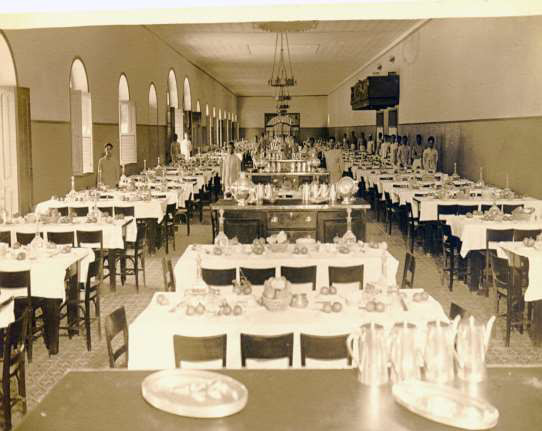

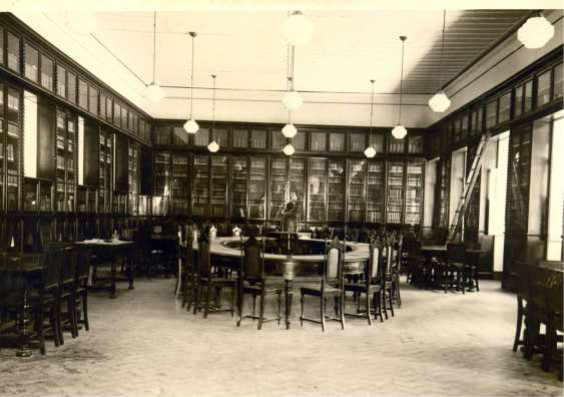
Refectory (top) and library (bottom) after the 1931 renovations

Major reforms in 1919–1920 put an end to the original precariousness. The building was expanded, taking on the shape of a long rectangle with three courtyards, divided by pavilions. The façade was renovated in an art nouveau style and the first courtyard received a second floor. In the early 1930s, it was used for classrooms, administrative offices and, in the background, the library and cinema; the second courtyard had living quarters, and the third, living quarters on one side, the ranch and casino (Note: "In military parlance, the officers' or sergeants' casino is the place, in military establishments, intended for the rest and leisure of these military personnel. They are usually located in an area adjacent to the cafeterias" (Roesler 2021, p. 342).) on the other, and the infirmary pavilion at the rear. Despite the expansions, the facilities remained sober and modest and comfort was not a priority. A decade later, the dormitories, infirmary, kitchen and dining halls were already degraded, there were no specific places for leisure and prison, there was little water and physical activities were carried out in soggy land.

Large resources were allocated to complete renovations in 1931, under the command of José Pessoa. These included, among other improvements, a closer train station, grand hall, service gate, furniture, decor and expanded classrooms and living quarters. The ranch, bathrooms, library and casino became more pleasant, and students now had a banking service at their disposal. The Campo de Marte in front of the School was used for a new department of physical education, and adjacent to it, a department of riding.

To this day, the urban structure of Realengo retains traces of military planning. The Armed Forces were the main force in the neighborhood's development until the 1930s, planning landfills, canalization, drainage, sanitation, lighting, opening roads, and health and education facilities. Training officers gave great prestige to the place and attracted investment and infrastructure. Students and employees stimulated the commercial and real estate sectors. The central region received the most attention from governments, creating a disparity with the periphery, which remained bucolic for the longest time. The inhabitants of higher social status lived closer to the Military School.

== Teaching ==
=== Duration and courses ===
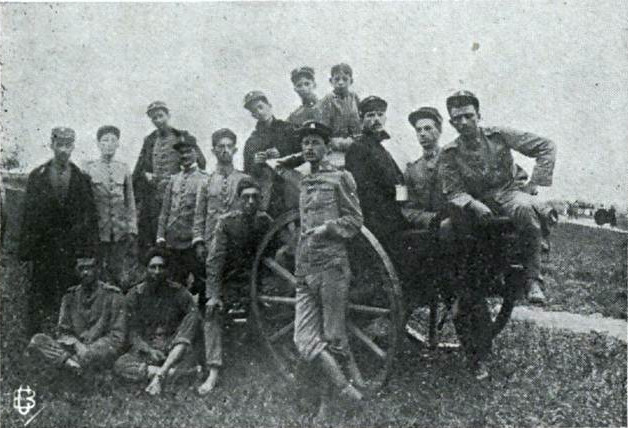
Students with an artillery piece

The courses at the Military School of Realengo were equivalent to higher education. The branches were treated as different lines of study. This lasts until today, but it was unprecedented in Brazilian military education; until then, they were treated as different levels of study, and students learned content that they would not apply in service in their branches. By its first regulation, all students took a two-year Fundamental Course and then chose a Specific Course in one of the four branches. The Infantry and Cavalry courses lasted one year, and the more complex Artillery and Engineering courses lasted two. There was thus a distinction between the “scientific courses” (Artillery and Engineering) and the “alfalfa courses” (Infantry and Cavalry). Until 1918, students still spent one year at the Practical School after the Specific Course. In 1919 the duration of the Engineering and Artillery courses was reduced to one year, making the branches equivalent, which lasts until today. This duration was shorter than that of previous schools, which were equivalent to secondary and higher education; in 1890–1904, engineering education took ten years.

In the 1929 three-year curriculum, general subjects for all branches and specifics were mixed in the second year. Candidates for the new Aviation branch learned only part of Elementary School and general military education in Realengo, concluding their studies at the Military Aviation School, in Campo dos Afonsos. The course was expanded to four years in 1934, but in the following year the duration returned to three years, as determined by the Minister of War. A further expansion and reversion occurred respectively in 1940 and 1942. The reason given for the reduction was the shortage of serving lieutenants.

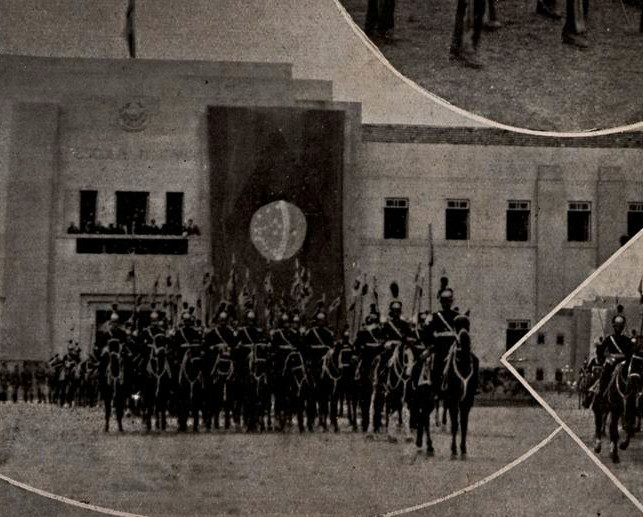
Cavalry parade

Students could choose the Specific Course according to their grades. The most disputed were, in descending order, Engineering, Artillery, Cavalry and Infantry. The first two required a solid understanding of calculus. Cavalry was preferred by officers from Rio Grande do Sul, accustomed to riding in the Pampas, and most army units of this branch were also located in Rio Grande do Sul. The branches lived in formal equality, but competed on the symbolic level and cultivated different “spirits”. Engineering, valued at the beginning of the century, acquired a certain disdain from the other branches for being the “most undercover”, while Artillery was considered an elite, for combining scientific and military aspects. The Infantry was scorned as the “leftover” of the less qualified students, but could be proud of facing the enemy in hand-to-hand, in addition to being more focused on commanding men. Students who opted for Aviation studied outside Realengo and lost contact with the Army, developing their own culture.

=== Curriculum ===
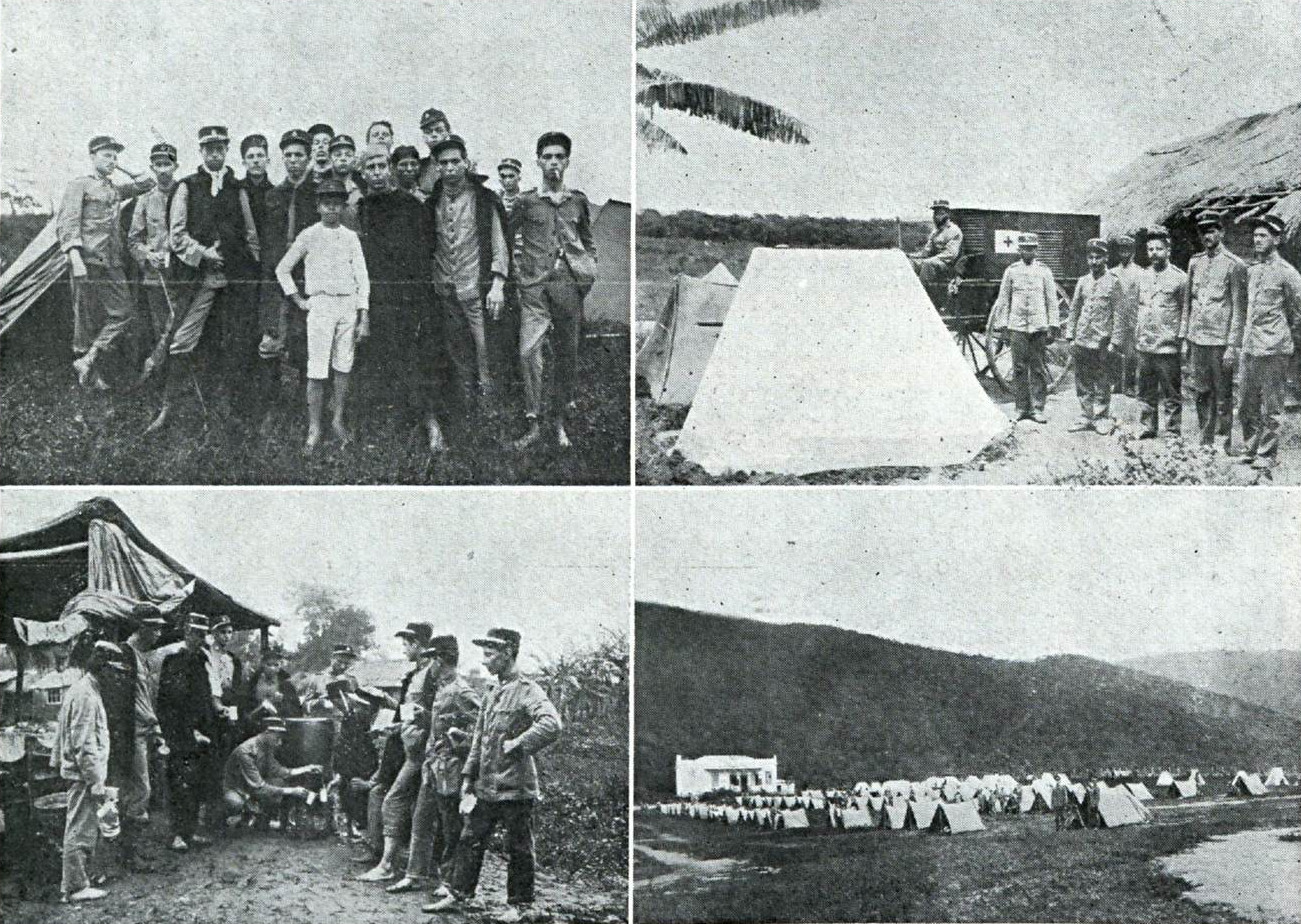
Practical teaching: students camped out during field maneuvers in 1914

The regulations of the 1910s emphasized the integration of the contents to their practical applications in the work of the officers. The 1913–1914 regulation condemned “theoretical excesses”, “useless digressions” and “premature generalizations”. All content would be practical or theoretical-practical. Practical teaching, especially with physical exertion, was considered a watershed for the theoreticism at Praia Vermelha. The subjects were grouped into seven groups, not always with affinities: 1) Mathematics and its Applications; 2) Law, Organization and Tactics; 3) Physics, Chemistry and Applications; 4) Fortification and Artillery; 5) Artillery and Engineering Services; 6) Combat Weapons, Fencing and Shooting; 7) Foreign Languages. To avoid distortions in the program, control over teachers was tightened. The Infantry and Cavalry courses, closer to combat, sought the rapid training of troop commanders and instructors, while the Artillery and Engineering courses were technical in nature and shared some subjects.

In the regulations of 1918 and 1919, the groups gave way to chairs (18 in 1918 and 13 in 1919), with more specific subjects and greater affinity. The appreciation of utilitarian content over “theoreticism” subjects reached its peak. Professional subjects occupied 70% of the curriculum. An evaluation coefficient, assigning different weights to grades in subjects, was adopted for promotions of aspiring second lieutenants. More practical subjects had greater weight from 1919 onwards, and moral qualities, a criterion evaluated by instructors and assistants, had the highest weight. The important thing for the officer, especially infantry, was to know how to command. The contents would not be exhaustive: the trainee should be a troop officer (troupier), with enough knowledge to lead a platoon and, at most, rise to the rank of captain. More advanced training would continue at EsAO and other schools.

The 1924 and 1929 regulations balanced the general scientific base with military technical training, resuming theoretical teaching. Disciplines such as Analytical Geometry and Experimental Physics returned and new ones emerged, such as the Army's Mission and the Officer's Mission. As employees of the state bureaucracy, officials should have a greater intellectual foundation and knowledge of the civilian sphere. Even so, the tendency towards specialization and the emphasis on the concrete application of the contents remained. In addition to teaching in classrooms, conferences, training and firing ranges, students were expected to visit military installations and attend exercises. The hierarchy of subjects and the quantification of moral qualities lost importance for a new system of final exams. At that time, theoretical teaching in this period left something to be desired, and general Tasso Fragoso, head of the EME from 1922 to 1929, described a “teacher crisis”. On the other hand, the instructors included energetic and ambitious officers, several of whom later rose to the rank of general.

Fundamental Course of 1929
Basic teaching	Theoretical Military Education	Practical Military Education
Analytical Geometry.; Differential and Integral Calculus.; Experimental physics.; Notions of meteorology.; Descriptive geometry, perspective and shadow; corresponding drawing.	Study of the Army's mission and the officer's social mission.; Organization of the Brazilian Army.; Study of the regulation of physical instruction preceded by notions of anatomy and physiology necessary for its rational execution.; Study of regulatory portable weapons and their means of preservation. Principles that govern their organization; Study of the regulations for infantry exercises and combat, for shooting small arms, for service in the field, for transmissions, and for the organization of the terrain, in the part necessary for the corresponding practical teaching.; Study of the regulation for general services in troop corps, including the disciplinary part.; Elementary notions of topography. Study of the terrain, its morphology and how to represent it on charts.	Military physical instruction.; Soldier, Combat Group and Platoon School.; Training for group and platoon combat.; Technical shooting instruction and individual instruction for the shooter for combat (rifle, submachine gun and grenade).; Instruction of the soldier, the group and the platoon in the different situations of service in the field (clearer, sentry, patrol, small post).; Construction of the fundamental types of the constitutive elements of the land organization; Instruction of the courier, messenger, signalman and telephone operator, and organization of the command post of the company.; Orientation exercises, terrain identification and carrying out simple surveys.; Emergency medical aid.

1929 Engineering Course - 1st year
Basic teaching	Theoretical Military Education	Practical Military Education
Rational Mechanics.; Chemistry.; Topography and Topographic Design.; Notions of Law. Military Legislation. Military Administration.	Notions of hygiene and prophylaxis essential for health and the preservation of good sanitary conditions in military housing, in times of peace and war.; Study of the machine gun and accompanying equipment for infantry and tanks.; Continuation of the study of the regulations, namely: physical instruction, exercises and combat of infantry and its annexes, shooting of portable weapons, machine guns, field service, organization of the terrain, transmissions and general services in the troop corps.	Military physical instruction.; Instruction corresponding to the 1st part of the infantry regulation up to the battalion.; Review of group and platoon combat training exercises, combat training of light and heavy machine gun sections, 37 cannon and escort mortar.; Employment of platoon and company in combat.; Improvement of shooting technical instruction (rifle, submachine gun, grenade and machine gun).; Field service exercises; marches and parking.; Review of instructions for transmission agents; instruction of radiotelegraphers.; Organization of a battalion command post.; Combination of land organization elements; trenches, spaulders, sapping.; Practical topography exercises; planimetric and panoramic sketches; Writing exercises for orders, parts and reports, concerning matters dealt with in practice.; Fencing.; Horsemanship.

1929 Engineering Course - 2nd year
Theoretical Military Education	Practical Military Education
Ballistics.; Understanding the organization and tactics of the different branches (infantry, cavalry, artillery, aviation) and the use of engineering units.; Infantry tactics.; Notions of permanent fortification (land and coast). Historical overview of the fortification.; Notions on general applications of physics, chemistry and mechanics to military technique.; Military history.	Review and development of previous branch instruction.; Tactical exercises on the chart and on the terrain.; Military physical instruction.; General notions about administration in troop corps; Detailed company management.; Fencing.; Horsemanship.

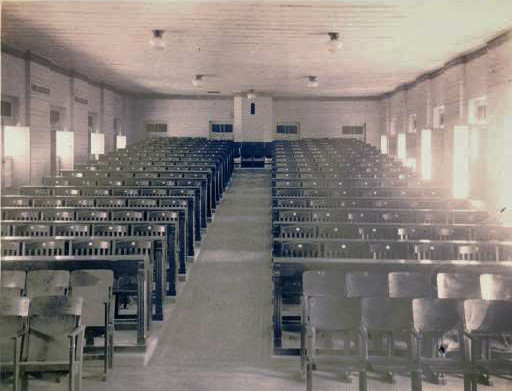
Classroom in 1937

Physical education received special attention under José Pessoa after 1930. The 1934 regulation intended to transmit general knowledge to the cadets, especially with the introduction of Sociology and Political Economy in the curriculum. Following professor Severino Sombra's concept, the function of Sociology would be the ideological homogenization of cadets, shielding them against communism. However, the course was only taught for a few months in 1935. The four-year curriculum of 1940 allowed the return of Sociology and Military Geography and the reinforcement of Administration, Military Legislation, Physics and Chemistry. Under the influence of the American concept of the “active school”, “there could be no improvised lessons, very eloquent speeches, nor almost insurmountable distances between the student and the teacher”. The students would have greater participation, and the contents would have greater complementarity. The 1942 regulation, while similar, reverted to the three-year charge.

== Student body ==
=== Selection and socioeconomic background ===
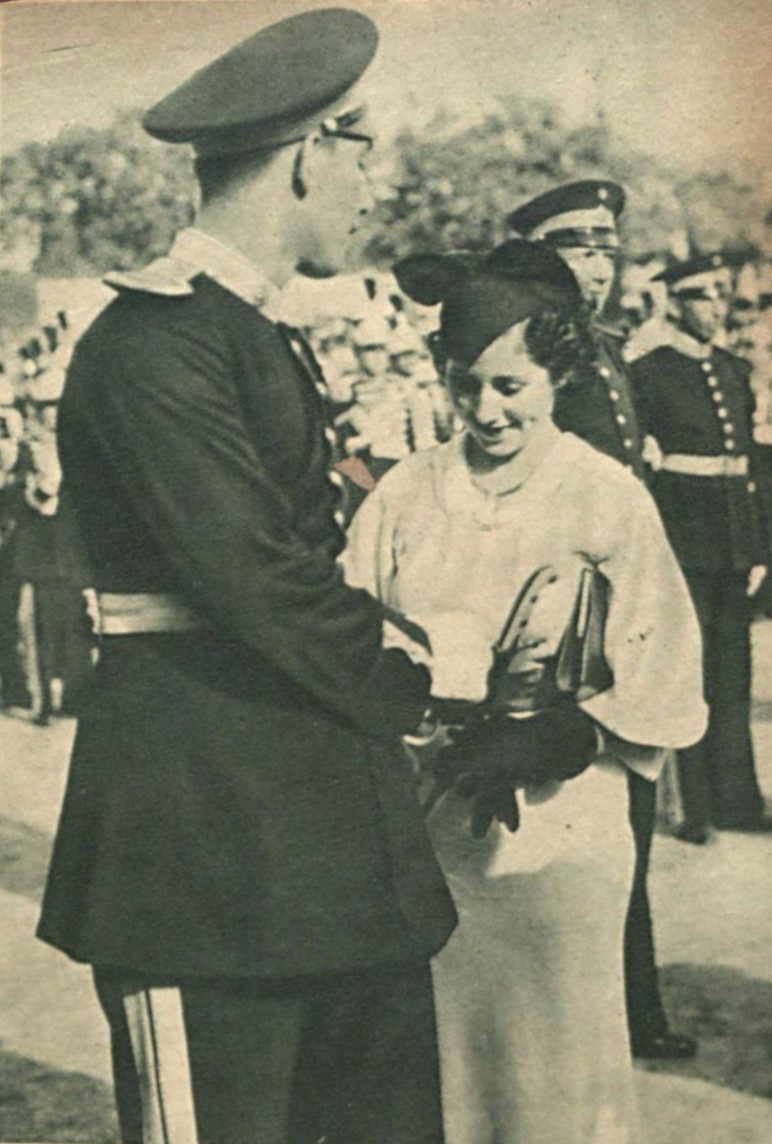
A cadet receiving his small sword from a woman watching the ceremony

The student body was initially made up of soldiers, graduates of the Military Colleges and, until 1919, officers. The Military Colleges were boarding schools for military families and some civilians. The 1916 regulation distinguished between positions reserved for graduates of Military Colleges, enlisted personnel and civilians. Until 1924, there were minimum service requirements in a troop corps for candidates. A three-year Preparatory Course was instituted in 1924 for 15- to 19-year-olds, but ceased to exist in the following decade. (Note: [José Pessoa] "has always been opposed to the idea of recreating a preparatory school for admission to the Military School" (Castro 1994, p. 237).) Cadet Preparatory Schools (EPCs) were created in Porto Alegre and São Paulo in 1939 and 1940. The EPC came to be considered a filter for the best cadets. Beginning in 1924, a certificate of honor signed by a civil or military authority was required.

The age group and social origin of the student body were homogeneous, apart from the officers in the first years. Entering the ranks of the Army was, during the First Brazilian Republic, a means of intellectual training and social ascension for families of modest economic status, especially those of the urban middle class. Some of the young people were from traditional military families, but the civilian elite was notably absent. Still, selection for the School required political influence, and educational prerequisites maintained a white majority in the officer corps. Since the previous century, many young people without a vocation for a career in arms, interested only in social ascension, became officers. Still in the 1930s, Góis Monteiro complained that the School attracted poor students without moral motivation for a career.

The 1934 regulation intended to broaden the candidates' social base, making it less endogenous and attracting the best civilian elements; until then, graduates of the Military Colleges occupied almost all positions. Half of the positions were reserved for the contest open to civilians. Applicants were required to have a “grade” of moral standing and intellectual ability from the head of their previous school and pass a qualifying medical inspection. Commander José Pessoa's idea was to “improve qualities, not correct defects”; however, he did not engage in or directly influence the discrimination. In the middle of the decade, more conservative officers intended to isolate the Army from contamination by external conflicts. Its most explicit measures were in recruiting officers. The military elite should correspond to the social elite. A discriminatory policy was applied to access the School from 1938, when general Dutra was Minister of War, as a State policy, regulated behind the scenes by instructions, official letters and secret circulars, in addition to decree-laws.

The Secret Note of 22 January 1941, from Dutra to the School Commander, is an explicit example. It established the following criteria for accepting candidates: "being a native Brazilian and the legitimate son of Brazilians who are also born; belonging to an organized and well-regarded family; be physically and mentally healthy; not colored; not – nor his parents – Jewish, Muhammedans or avowed atheist." (Note: The Muhammedans or "islamic" were a misclassification of the descendants of Lebanese and Syrians, also called "Turks" (Rodrigues 2008, p. 170). Such arab immigrants in Brazil were referred to as "Turks" for their origin in the Ottoman Empire. The vast majority were in fact Christian. See Waniez, Phillipe; Brustlein, Violette (2001). "Os muçulmanos no Brasil: elementos para uma geografia social" (PDF). Alceu. 1 (2). and Truzzi, Oswaldo (2016). "Religiosidade cristã entre árabes em São Paulo" (PDF). Religião e Sociedade. 36 (2).) Candidates' backgrounds and their families were taken into account by the Commandant of the School and the commission of officers that analyzed the individual files. Applicants provided a lot of information, and items such as surname and photograph were taken into account in their exclusion. Special cases were sent to the War Office office. The EPCs adopted the same discriminatory criteria. Armies from neighboring countries, such as Argentina and Bolivia, also had their forms of discrimination.

Racism and anti-Semitism in the criteria were political and cultural in nature. For Dutra, a Jew was not fit to be an officer because "he was a race devoid of land", and the black, because "it was not up to the Army to change social conventions". As for foreigners, the Estado Novo was nationalistic and blamed them for competing with Brazilian workers and introducing communism to the country. There was flexibility for the children of Portuguese, Spanish and Italian parents. In religion, the Estado Novo's proposal to make the nation a moral community and collective consensus brought it closer to the Catholic Church. The intended social pattern excluded illegitimate children, children from separated parents and single mothers, as well as less well-off parents. The unfit proportion reached almost 40% of candidates in 1942, but exceptions were still made due to palliatives such as being the son of an officer. The criteria were softened, but did not disappear, after the end of the Estado Novo and the 1946 Constitution.

In 1938–1942, around 70% of candidates' parents were from the middle and upper classes—professionals, civil servants (civil and military), and landowners. Civilians were the majority. In the classes of 1941–1943, 19.8% of students came from the traditional upper class, 76.4% from the middle class, 1.5% from the skilled lower class, and 2.3% from the unskilled lower class, as per analysis by political scientist Alfred Stepan. This analysis has superficialities, including civil servants and military personnel in the middle class without specifying their positions. 21.2% of cadets were children of military personnel. In 1939, 61.6% of cadets came from civilian high schools, and 38.4% from Military Colleges. In the following decades, the participation of the upper class retracted, that of the qualified lower class grew and recruitment became more endogenous, with greater participation of children of military personnel.

=== Discipline ===
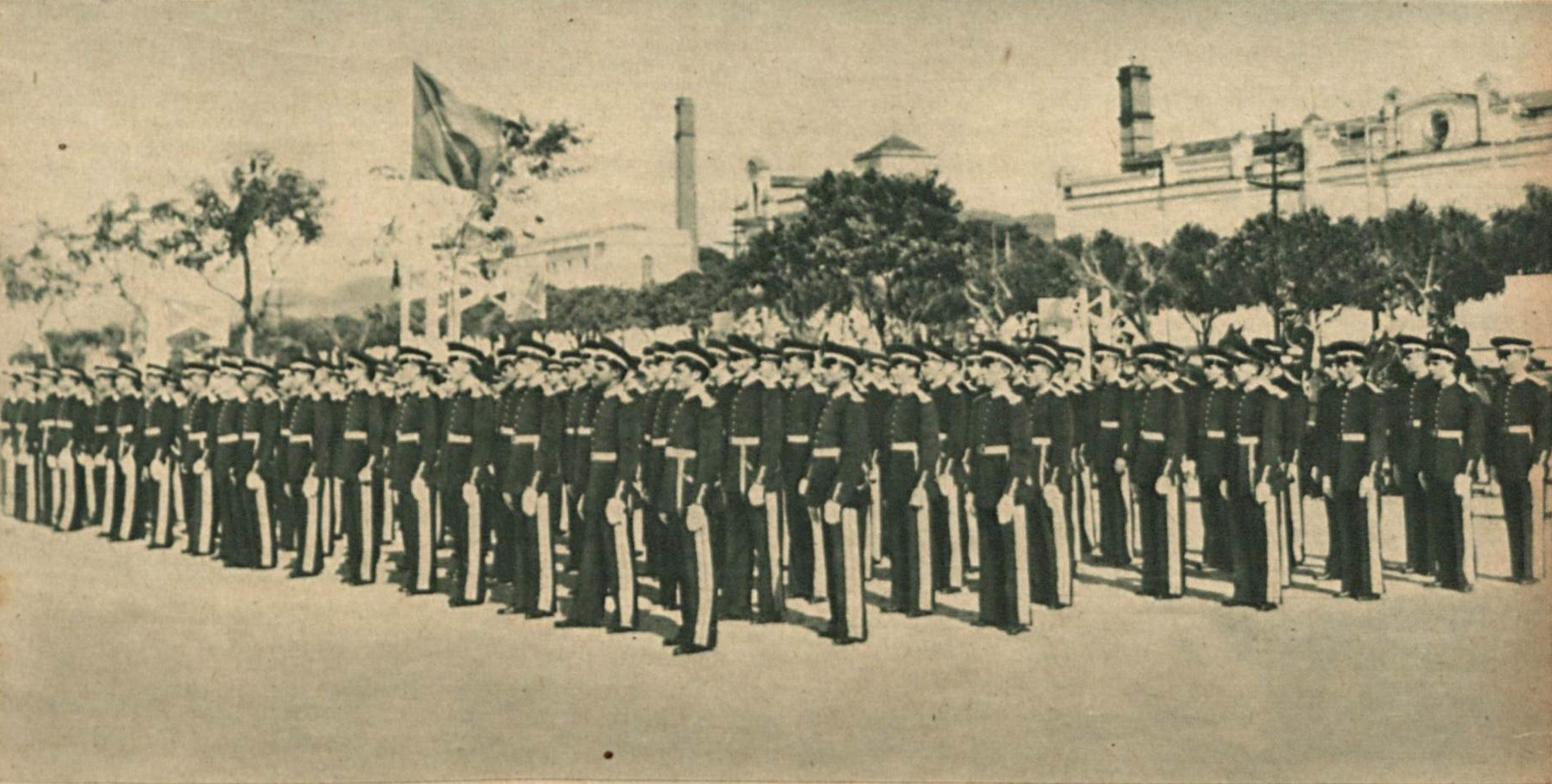
Cadet graduation

The disciplinary offenses provided for in the regulations ranged from common delays to more serious cases such as fights in the city or on the tram, confronting an instructor's authority or absence from the School during a punishment. The penalties were reprimands (privately or on a bulletin), impediments and arrests (forbidding the student to leave the accommodation or the internal area of the School), for milder cases, arrests (at the School or in a troop) and exclusion. Arrested or detained students were still required to attend daily work. Exclusion for disciplinary reasons was rare.

José Machado Lopes, a student in 1918, recalled an anarchic environment in the early years: the School was "an educational institution in which a family could not enter. The student's ideal was to be macho, with a gun on his waist and a machete in his vest." "Students would walk around naked and leave school that way to go buy a newspaper at the Station." "When the students passed through Bangu, people locked the doors, otherwise the students would invade everything." João Punaro Bley, recalling the same year, described the young people as “practically given over to their own impulses”. This changed in 1919–1922, when commander Monteiro de Barros and the instructors at the Indigenous Mission imposed a strict discipline, which students recalled as excessive. Prisons became the most common punishment, and the rate of punishments increased a lot. The verb “to toast” was synonymous with “to punish” at the time.

The Cadet Corps Regulations of 1931 reformulated punishments. For José Pessoa, the greatest control over the cadet should be his own conscience, and prison outside the School was harmful, as it mixed inexperienced young people with whom they should not have contact (undisciplined soldiers). Thus, during his command, the rate of punishments decreased and the few arrests were for attacks on the School's reputation or personal dignity. For lighter transgressions (“missing the curfew check, poor uniform appearance, lack of body cleanliness and hygiene in the accommodation, loss of documentation, delays at the ranch or instructional activities and failure to salute superiors”), detention and suspended licensing were applied, a new punishment in which the cadet could not leave on the days or hours of licensing; in both, they still circulated within the School. However, efforts to curb cheating on written tests had not been successful. José Pessoa himself ended his command in 1934 with a student strike, and for a year the two generals who succeeded him were unable to maintain control; only colonel Mascarenhas de Morais, who took office in 1935, managed to impose discipline again.

=== Students' life ===
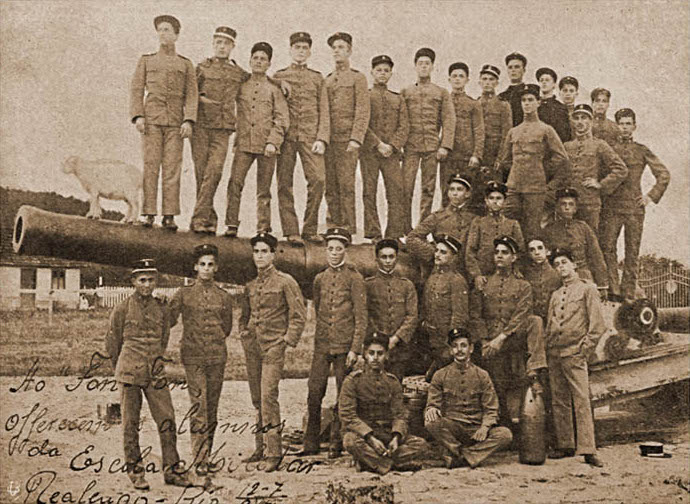
Students in 1913

The officer career had a reputation for being difficult to join. Many of the candidates who made it through the initial selection were turned off by the eliminatory exam at the end of the 1st semester, the infamous "carro de fogo" (fire car). (Note: In the class of 1918, everyone was enrolled in the second period, even those who failed, due to the deaths caused by the Spanish flu, according to Olímpio Mourão Filho, one of the students. According to him, this class was dubbed the "Alfalfa Course folks" (Lira Neto 2004).) As the newcomers, the “bichos” (beasts), were integrated to school life, they were subjected to hazing by seniors. Hazing, often with physical violence, was prohibited, but it still occurred. It imposed a hierarchy on the “bichos” and was a form of socialization.

The heavy routine of guard duty, studies, punishments, missing the family, etc. “dismantled” the students' individuality, creating a new identity, which was considered superior to the civilians. Selflessness came to be considered a requirement for a military career. The notions of honor, virility and romanticism reproduced throughout the career began to be assimilated at the Military School. Rites of passage such as hazing, exams, choosing branches, field exercises and graduation created a sense of belonging to the Army and the class, giving rise to the “Realengo generation”. Students lived in intense competition, but there was a sense of camaraderie.

Weather, daily activities, and permission to go out on weekends were all under the authority of the School Commander. Juarez Távora, who studied under the 1913–14 regulation, described the routine as follows: (Note: Marcusso 2012, p. 117. Another description, by João Punaro Bley, under the 1919 regulation: "dawn at 5 AM, first meal at 5;30 AM, line up and departure for the different fields of instruction at 6 AM, return at 10 AM, lunch at 11 AM, theoretical classes at 12 to 4:30 PM, dinner at 5:30 PM, an hour and a half of recreation outside the School, but in Realengo and surroundings, review at 7 PM, silence at 9 PM, full instruction time on Fridays." (Marcusso 2012, p. 145).)

We woke up at 4.30 AM to wash our faces or shower and dress. Around 5.30 the 'rancho' for coffee would play. And normally we should be formed at 6, for instruction in the field. At 9, we had lunch, and after a short break, theoretical classes began at 10 AM. At 3 PM we had dinner. From 4 PM we could leave the school grounds and take a walk around Realengo. At 6 PM the 'rancho' played for supper. After supper we had studies in the classroom, which lasted until 9 PM, when 'review' was playing. At that sound, the students formed up in their respective barracks, for a conference, by the officer on the day, of the cadets present. Finally, at 10 PM, 'silence' played.

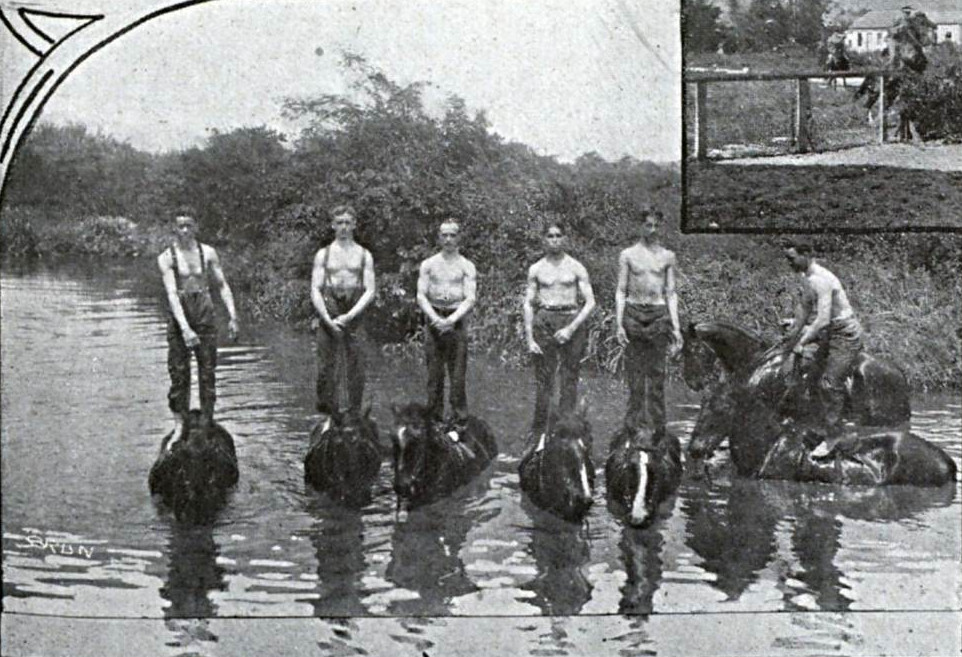
Riding lessons in 1914

The Indigenous Mission used strict discipline and hard physical work to absorb the youth's energy. In the words of João Punaro Bley, “four hours of instruction in the sun and hot sands of Gericinó to the rigors of virile and diversified exercises 'broke' anyone”. The timetable changed little, but the rigor of the physical exercises became known even outside the School. The infamous “death ramp”, in which the students, carrying all the equipment, had to climb a steep obstacle, jump over a deep ditch and crawl under barbed wire, left Humberto Castelo Branco injured for two weeks.

The organization of the Student Corps in 1918 increased the military framework of students' lives. Unlike American cadets, Brazilian students did not have the opportunity to command subunits; for the Army, students had to obey before they could command. Instructors were in close, daily contact with students. Another aspect of the military framework was boarding school life, for which the School was conceived from the beginning. However, originally most students lived in fraternities. Internment did not become integral until 1930. Detailed and unprecedented details of cadet life were covered in 1932 by the Cadet Corps Bylaws. Its time and space were rigorously controlled, bringing the School closer to the concept of a “total institution”.

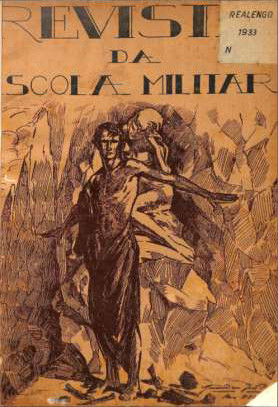
The Military School Magazine of 1933

The bonds of association between the students were strong, and they had a Military Academic Society (SAM). In the early decades (1910s and 1920s), due to the lack of recreational facilities, the pastime was to walk through the streets of Realengo. Nocturnal getaways were undertaken to discuss politics, steal chickens, as meals were austere, and visit nearby prostitutes, as the School was an exclusive male environment. A dozen students founded a Vincentian Conference in 1917, under the influence of the parish priest of Realengo. One of them, Juarez Távora, reported an environment hostile to religion until the Vincentians' demonstration of altruism during the Spanish flu in 1918. The Catholic movement in the School grew much more in the following decade.

In the 1930s Commander José Pessoa sought to increase the cadets' social standing. He discouraged their participation in the suburban festivities of Méier and Bangu, prohibited their permanence in taverns and billiards, “where elements of all classes gather, so as to avoid a promiscuity that does not pay them any respect”, and convinced the biggest clubs (Tijuca and Fluminense) to invite cadets to their dances. Physical renovations made the School more comfortable. Testimonials from former cadets in the 1980s recall the much higher social status of Realengo cadets than AMAN cadets decades later; in the late 1930s and early 1940s, cadets had prestige for clubs, parties, and dating. This went hand in hand with their higher social background at this time.

Cultural manifestations were concentrated in SAM, which edited the Revista da Escola Militar magazine (currently Revista Agulhas Negras), with an annual circulation. From 1933 it became more literary. More intellectual cadets published short stories, poetry and philosophical themes. The most politicized followed economic and social themes in A Defesa Nacional. Most students found little time for reading. Cadets appeared in the media in the 1930s and 1940s, especially in the short films of Cine Jornal Brasileiro, produced by the Department of Press and Propaganda. In the 1930s, an annual sporting competition against midshipmen from the Naval School began.

== Symbols and rituals ==
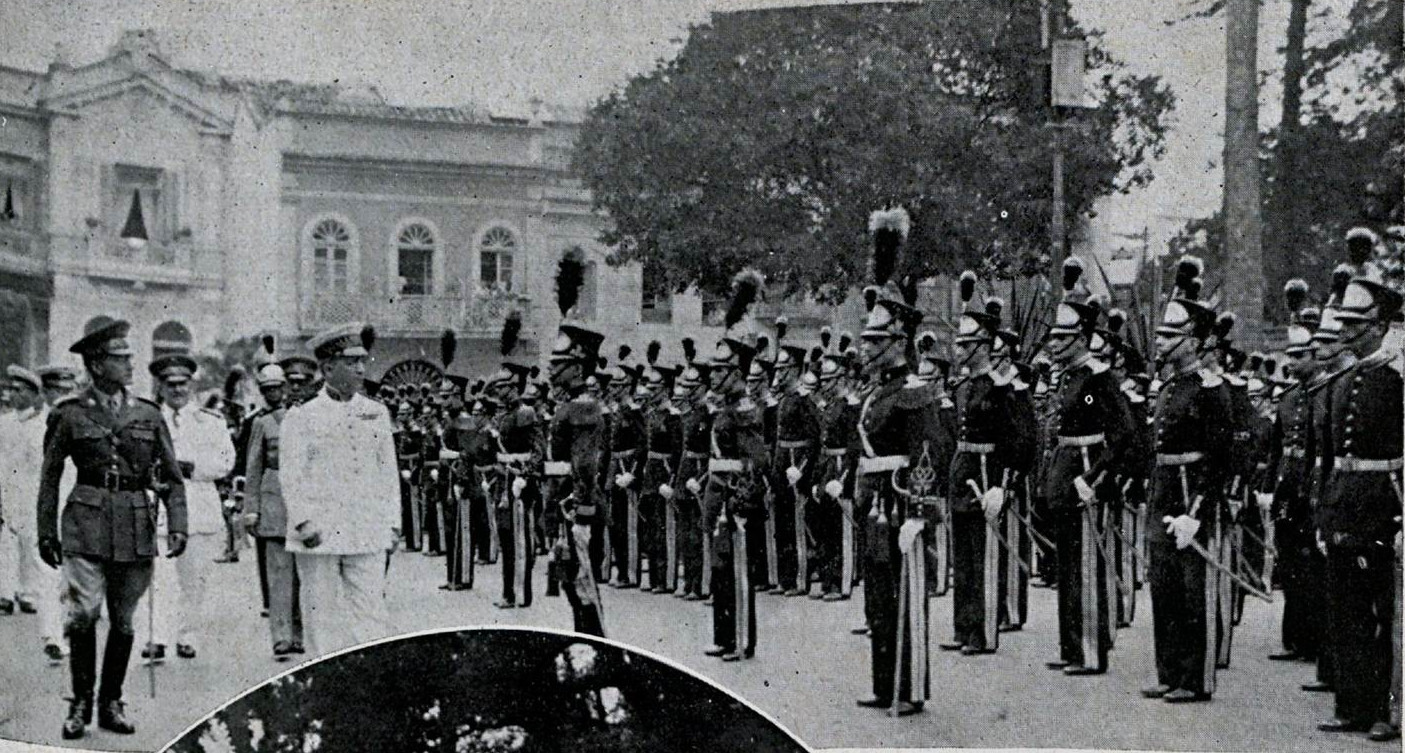
Cadets in dress uniforms and swords during a tribute to the Duke of Caxias in 1935

The French custom of naming classes after a military chief (patron) or famous battle was first adopted by graduates in 1925. They called themselves “Turma Caxias” (Caxias Class) in honor of the Duke of Caxias, whose veneration was promoted by the military authorities as a symbol of the Army's internal unity. At that time, students wore a khaki uniform with leather leggings, identified by a brass insignia, depicting a castle, worn on the high collar. Considering these uniforms little different from common soldiers, José Pessoa approved a new outfit in 1931. The gala uniforms, in the colors iron-blue and white, were inspired by units of all Arms of the imperial era. (Note: "A shako with a golden metal plate, on which the coat of arms of the School appeared; palm epaulletes and scarlet paddles with gilded ornaments; cords with paddles and tassels with different colors on the fringes, in order to distinguish the year the cadets were studying". The main inspiration was the rifle battalions in the Platine War in 1852. Artist José Wasth Rodrigues, an illustrator of old uniforms, participated in the elaboration of the new regulation of uniforms (Roesler 2021, pp. 363–364).) They were flashy, although some soldiers, such as Nelson Werneck Sodré, preferred the sobriety of the original uniforms.

The historic uniforms, coat of arms, small swords, the Cadets Corps and the standard, developed at this time, are a successful case of “invention of traditions”, which remain in use at AMAN. Their reference, personified by the Duke of Caxias, was the middle of the imperial period, far from political turbulence, representing the stability and timelessness intended for the military institution itself. Traditions demarcated the elite status of cadets and emotionally linked them to the School. One of the first changes was the recovery of the name “cadet” to designate the students. This title was originally used for students of noble origin and had been abolished in 1897, to remove the memory of the Empire, but it returned precisely because of its aristocratic connotation. The small swords, replicas of the sword of the Duke of Caxias, were given to cadets during the course and returned shortly before graduation. The coat of arms left the Agulhas Negras Peak at the back of the castle, considered a symbol of national unity. The coat of arms was included on a turquoise background in the standard, which is simple and easy to differentiate from Brazil's national flag and other military units.

== Political involvement ==
=== Ideological environment in the school ===
Curricula at the Military School were professional and apolitical from the start, and the location itself was designed to depoliticize students. Contradicting the politically active “citizen-soldier” ideology of Praia Vermelha, students at Realengo should be a “professional-soldier”, faithful to the hierarchy, with their individuality diluted within the institution. In 1925, an EME report defined instruction as the solution to discipline the officer corps, preventing new revolts. The reference was the French image of the Army as the apolitical “great mute”. Only generals should be involved in politics.

The young officers reached a new level of professionalism and tactical knowledge; Cordeiro de Farias defined his generation formed in 1919 as the first in the Army to receive a truly military training. This did not mean into an absence of political contestation, and this same military knowledge was used against the government during the tenentism revolts. Contrary to what the military establishment intended, the Military School produced highly politicized officers, willing to sacrifice their personal and professional lives and the cohesion of the institution.

The tradition of political interventionism of the young officers, who saw the Army as the guardian of the Republic, continued to live in Realengo. Positivism, Florianism and the legacy of Benjamin Constant still had echoes. This tradition was exacerbated by the reforms as the distinction between military and civilians was reinforced. The new officers saw themselves as morally superior and more interested in the good of Brazil than civilians, especially the oligarchic politicians of the First Republic. The importance of individual merit (school results) in a career was contrasted with the clientelism of civil society. The environment at the School was politicized and dislike of the political system was common, although the young officers had no common ideology or political program.

=== Participation in revolts ===
The hostility between the young officers and president Epitácio Pessoa, in 1922, extended to the instructors and students at Realengo. They joined the conspiracy to remove the president and install Hermes da Fonseca. The plan was to join the also rebellious 1st Infantry Division, in Vila Militar, and proceed to the Catete Palace, where the president was. On the night of 4 to 5 July almost all students and officers agreed to take part in the rebellion. Led by colonel Xavier de Brito, director of the Realengo Cartridge School, they arrested colonel Monteiro de Barros, director of the Military School, and proceeded to Vila Militar on the 5th. To their surprise, Vila Militar was loyal to the government. After four hours of fighting, in which one student died, the rebels ceased their resistance. In the rest of the city, the revolt lasted until the next day at Fort Copacabana. As a result of the revolt, the Indigenous Mission came to an end and even colonel Monteiro de Barros, loyal to the government, lost command because of his attitude of trying to flee Vila Militar. 584 students were dismissed, leaving only 40. In 1923, the School had an empty appearance and was in a rebuilding mood. In the Army as a whole, tenentism was inaugurated.

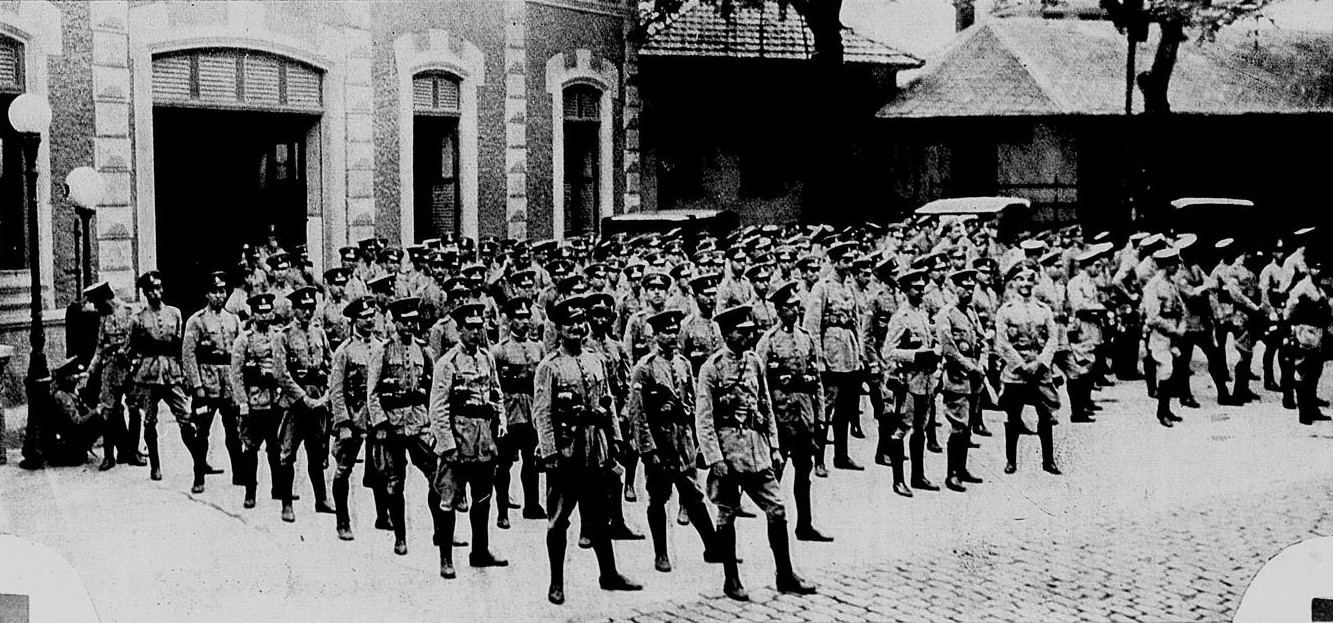
Students on guard at the presidential palace after the 1930 Revolution

After the outbreak of the 1930 Revolution outside Rio de Janeiro, the School was put on standby and students' access to the radio and newspapers was prohibited, seeking, without success, to avoid being contaminated by the revolutionary climate. Some instructor lieutenants wanted to participate. On 24 October, an uprising broke out in Rio de Janeiro. The commander, general Constâncio Deschamps Cavalcanti, and other officers remained loyal to the government. Deschamps went to the Army headquarters, where he was ordered no longer to support the legally constituted authorities; three days later he was removed from office. Days after the fall of the government, the School staff went to the city center at the insistence of the students, who clamored for the traditions of Praia Vermelha and 1922. The situation was under control, but revolutionary irregular troops, recently arrived from other states, created an atmosphere of turmoil. Students guarded key points, including the Catete Palace, and controlled traffic on main avenues.

Several cadets sympathized with the Constitutionalist Revolution of 1932, discouraged by the provisional government of Getúlio Vargas installed in the Revolution of 1930. José Pessoa, commander of the School, refused Góis Monteiro's request to employ two or three batteries of artillery, furnished with cadets, on the front lines against the constitutionalists. He argued that the war operation would compromise officer training, discredit the government, and threaten to involve the cadets in a fratricidal political struggle. A mistaken report of the disarmament of the School led to a massive dismissal of cadets, who compromised to report to the Ministry of War in order to continue their time of service. José Pessoa managed to stop the movement and kept the School running while the constitutionalists were defeated.

Several cadets, as well as young officers and sergeants, had direct or indirect involvement with communism. The Communist Party's Antimilitary Committee (Antimil) managed to convert some cadets who were disappointed with the course of the 1930 Revolution. In the Communist Uprising of 1935, the commander of the School, alerted by officers of the Military Aviation School about the beginning of the revolt, armed the cadets and took them to the road to Campo dos Afonsos, arresting the fleeing rebels. Although this action was not militarily relevant, the Military School's unprecedented loyalty to constituted authorities was a relief to Army authorities.

=== The "Realengo generation" ===
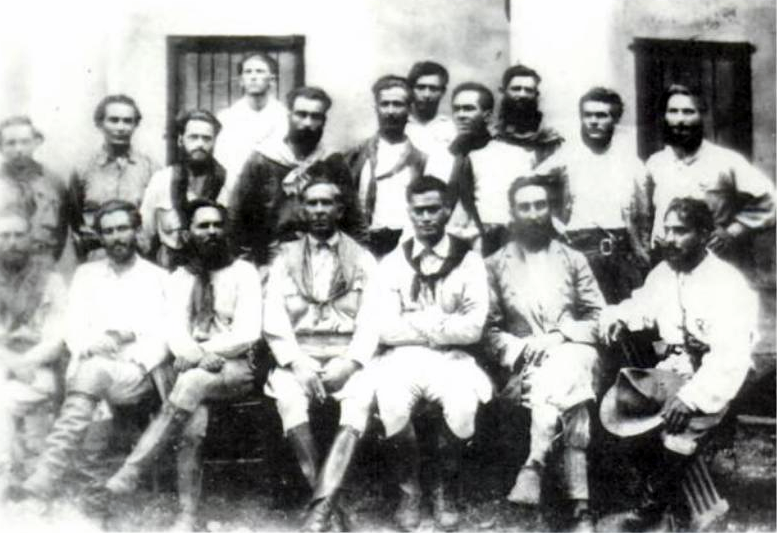
Luís Carlos Prestes, Juarez Távora, Siqueira Campos and other colleagues in charge of the Prestes Column, with Miguel Costa, of the Public Force of São Paulo, at the center

Former students and former instructors of Realengo after the Indigenous and the French Missions were predisposed to political involvement, but it is not possible to generalize the political behavior of all. Many held public office, especially after the Army assumed a more central position in society after the 1930 Revolution. In the Indigenous Mission there were names of great political projection later in the century, such as Henrique Teixeira Lott, Juaréz Távora and Odylio Denys.

The original tenentist generation was formed in Realengo in 1918–1919, especially among the 51 second lieutenants and 146 officer candidates formed in December 1919. The officer candidates of December 1918 were retained for another year to be trained by the Indigenous Mission. From there emerged what historian Frank McCann defined as "the most technically professional rebels the Army has ever faced", such as Luís Carlos Prestes, Antônio de Siqueira Campos, Eduardo Gomes and Juarez Távora. For one of them, Cordeiro de Farias, the Prestes Column was successful thanks to the ties formed a few years earlier in Realengo. There Siqueira Campos, Eduardo Gomes and Juarez Távora discussed politics and the First World War at the "Tugúrio de Marte", a rented house outside the School, sometimes frequented by Luís Carlos Prestes.

The generals responsible for the 1964 coup d'état were formed between the professionalizing reforms of the 1910s and José Pessoa's reform after 1930; many considered the Military School as the decisive period in their formation, but their later practices of political interventionism were diverse and are not due solely to Realengo. Throughout their careers, this small subgroup had training at the General Staff School and, in some cases, the Superior War School, and had a strong presence in public and diplomatic positions. Some had a rebellious-insurrectionary political profile, participating in tenentism in the 1920s, others with a technobureaucratic profile only entered politics with the 1930 Revolution, securing positions in the new regime, and some institutional conspirators only got involved in politics later, such as the first ruler of the military dictatorship, Humberto Castelo Branco. In his 1918–1921 class, he was a colleague of other dictatorship generals such as Artur da Costa e Silva, Olímpio Mourão Filho and Amaury Kruel. The presidents of the military dictatorship, including the last one (João Figueiredo, in 1979–1985), were all Realengo alumni.

== Transfer to Resende ==
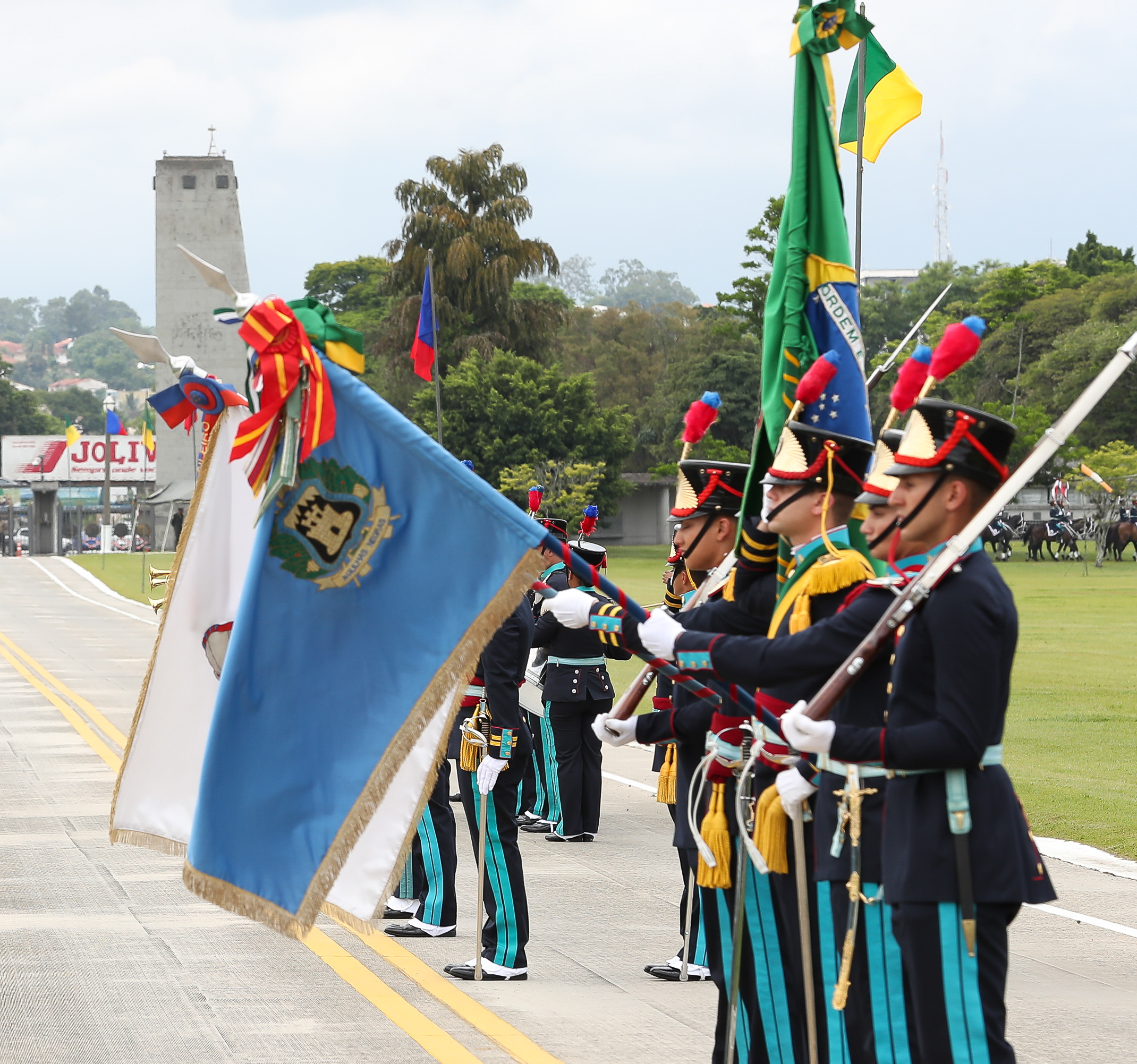
AMAN cadets' banner and uniform in 2020

Building a new Military School, away from the political turmoil of large population centers, had been commander José Pessoa's ambition since 1931. His requirements for the site were climatic, sanitary, topographical, hydrological, logistical and social. The competition considered the municipalities of Resende, Petrópolis, Teresópolis and Seropédica, in Rio de Janeiro, the Pinheiros Zootechnical Post, in São Paulo, and Várzea do Marçal in São João Del-Rei, Minas Gerais. The commander's favorite, Resende, in the region of Agulhas Negras, prevailed. In September 1931, the Minister of War and the provisional government approved the location, and the following year, architect Raul Penna Firme designed the project.

The idea was not official consensus; for its opponents, a harmful contrast would emerge between the new School and the reality of the barracks. When José Pessoa wanted to install the foundation stone in 1933, the authorities did not appear, claiming that there was no official procedure in progress for the implantation of the School. Financial and bureaucratic difficulties delayed the project and it was forgotten until 1937, when the blueprints were unarchived and construction carried out from 1939 to 1944. In the gradual transition, the two Schools in Realengo and Resende existed simultaneously, the latter starting its activities on 1 January 1944, and the former ending on December 31 of the same year. The transfer began with the 1st year cadets, as their activities were simpler. The installation of the branches courses was only definitive in February 1945, and in August of that same year the new Military School of Resende formed its first aspiring officers. The name change to the current “Military Academy of Agulhas Negras” occurred in 1951.

After the transfer, the facilities in Realengo were occupied by a number of other military organizations. The building is currently used as the headquarters of the School Unit Group - 9th Motorized Infantry Brigade.
