= José Pessoa =

Brazilian military officer

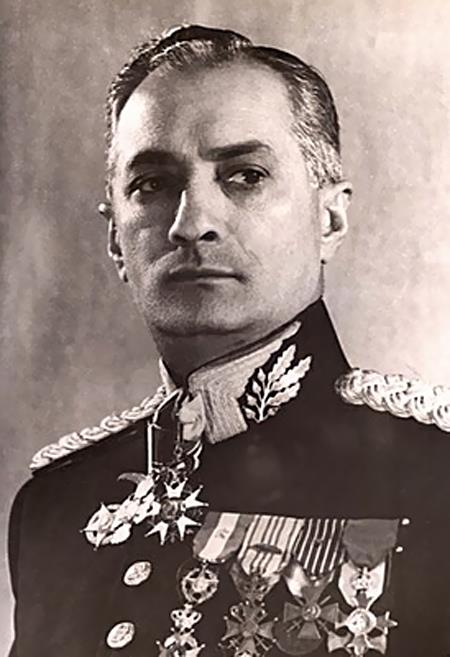
- Jose Pessoa in the last years of his military career
- Born: 13 September 1885; Cabaceiras, Paraíba, Empire of Brazil
- Died: 16 August 1959 (aged 73); Rio de Janeiro, Federal District, Brazil
- Spouse: Blanche Mary Edward (m. 1918)
- Military career
- Allegiance: Brazil
- Branch: Brazilian Army
- Service years: 1903–1955
- Rank: Marshal
- Commands: 10th Military Regionbr; 4th Dragoon Regiment; 2nd Cavalry Division; Military School of Realengo; Southern Military Command; 1st Military Region
- Conflicts: World War I Copacabana Fort Revolt; Revolution of 1930
- Awards: Combat Cross; Cross of II Leopold of Belgium; Brazil's Blood; War Medal
- Other work: Author

José Pessoa Cavalcanti de Albuquerque (13 September 1885 – 16 August 1959) was a military officer, who became a marshal in the Brazilian Army. Son of Cândido Albuquerque and Maria Albuquerque, he was the nephew of Epitácio Pessoa (Brazil's President from 1919 to 1922), and brother of João Pessoa, the Governor of Northern State of Paraíba. He was one of the officers sent on a preparatory mission to Europe by the Brazilian Army during the World War I against the Central Powers. In his subsequent career he had a strong influence on the reform and update of some Brazilian Army branches and institutions. To honor him, the 12th Cavalry Regiment of the Brazilian Army adopted his name.

== Early career ==
He joined the Brazilian Army in 1903 in the 2nd Infantry Battalion in Recife, followed by the Preparatory and Tactical School in Realengo (Rio de Janeiro). He was transferred in 1909 to the War College in Porto Alegre, from where he left the aspirant-to-officer. He was at the disposal of the Ministry of Justice, serving in the Federal District Police Brigade. He was assistant of command and assistant of the command of the division of operations sent to Mato Grosso to pacify the state in 1917, later serving like assistant of orders and assistant of the inspector of the 10th Military Region in Bahia.

== World War I ==
For his performance in his career, with the entry of Brazil into World War I, he was appointed in October 1917 to attend the preparatory military mission which the Brazilian Army sent to France to fought the Western Front. There, he spent a brief internship at Saint-Cyr to learn about the adaptation of his military branch (the Cavalry) to the then-recent invention, the tank. After this, he joined the 4th Dragoons Regiment of the 2nd Cavalry French Division. That year, this regiment (as other French cavalry units) using Schneider and St Chamond models, at the cost of heavy losses, participated actively in the containment of German spring offensives, and later, already with the then new and revolutionary Renault FTs, in the successful final Allied counter-offensives.

While serving with the 4th Dragoons (a unit, at the time of his arrival, consisted mostly of colonial troops), he commenced as a troop commander and was promoted to squadron commander. He held the rank of captain, and was decorated by the Belgians and French, for courage in action, which he insisted should be credited to the bravery of his subordinates, who even came to gift him with grisly necklaces made with ears of enemy soldiers. By war's end, while hospitalized in a Red Cross field hospital, afflicted with typhoid fever, he had an affair with an English nurse, who later became his wife.

== Reformer and ideologue ==
Upon his return to Brazil after the war, he was appointed in special commission to accompany the King and Queen of Belgium, Albert I and Elisabeth. Through his experience with tanks in World War he participated in the organization of the first unit of tanks of the Brazilian Army, remaining in command of this squadron until 1923, when he was promoted to major. It was during this time that his company of tanks was responsible for stopping the march of the rebel officers towards the government palace in the episode of the 18 of the Copacabana Fort revolt in 1922. He also drew on his experiences to advocate for reform in the Brazilian Army. Although he has achieved relative success regarding some institution's internal matters (e.g. on the reform of the Brazilian Army Academy), his post-1930 position against the involvement of the military in politics and civil life gradually moved him away from the center of military power.

Also in 1930, he was appointed in November as the new director of the Military School of Realengo, the then body responsible for training career officers in the Brazilian army. He held this position from November 19 of that year until August 7, 1934. During this period he was the founder, patron and founder of the a new campus of an organ that would replace the School located in Realengo, Academia Militar das Agulhas Negras, which the new campus was founded in 1944. As of the new symbols of the Army: historical uniforms, coat of arms, marlins and the creation of the cult of the figure of the Duke of Caxias.

Having been promoted in 1933 to the general-of-brigade, faced the following year a movement of boycott of the cadets of the establishment that commanded. Discontented with the solution given to the case, he resigned from the command of the school, being named then inspector and commander of the Coastal Artillery District of the 1st Military Region in the Federal District. He was also the founder of the Coastal Artillery Instruction Center.

Such that his war experiences, which partly he made public through the 1921 book Os Tanks na Guerra Européia ("Tanks in the European war"), that could have been seminal for the development and upkeep of a modern Army armoured corps; after a shy start in the early 1920s, were not longer availed by the High Command, even during World War II, when the creation of an Expeditionary Force became necessary.

== Communist uprising and Estado Novo ==
In December 1935, in Rio de Janeiro, he was present at the meeting of the generals convened on the grounds of the Communist uprising that occurred the previous month. The purpose of this meeting was to examine the situation of the country after the uprising and to discuss the extension of the legislation concerning existing repressive laws to punish the insurgents. José Pessoa disagreed with most of those present, considering the discussion of existing laws or of new legislation to punish the crimes committed irrelevant, since the subject matter was the responsibility of jurists, not of the generals of the Army.

Due to José Pessoas's opposition to military interference in politics, and to other frictions with the dominant current in power, the command of the army showed no interest in investing in development in order to apply also against possible external enemies, modern doctrine on the use of armor in warfare, since José was the main connoisseur and promoter in Brazil (who had recorded it in a book published in 1921 along with his experience in World War I), even when the country entered World War II. This position also gradually removed him from the center of military power during the Estado Novo, during which he became disciplined.

Being during this period, relegated to the minor functions in relation to this center, promoted to general-of-division in May 1940, traveled in 1943 to Paraguay like extraordinary ambassador to the possession of the president of that nation. Elected president of the Military Club in May 1944, he took office in June and remained there until June 1946.

== Later years ==
With the end of Estado Novo, he was appointed military attache in London from 1946 to 1947. Between 23 July 1948 and 16 September 1949, he commanded the Southern Military Command in Porto Alegre.

After going to the Reserve in September 1949, at the post of general-of-the-army (his promotion to marshal would occur only in January 1953), he continued to actively participate in the mobilization of public opinion in favor of a nationalist solution to the oil question, A participation that had begun in 1948, during the foundation of the Center for Studies and Defense of Oil and the National Economy (CEDPEN), together with Artur Bernardes and the generals Estêvão Leitão de Carvalho and Júlio Caetano Horta Barbosa. Around CEDPEN were articulated students, journalists, military, teachers, among others. The Petroleum Campaign, as it became known, would lead to the establishment of the state monopoly in 1953 and the consequent creation of Petrobras in 1954.

In 1954, he was invited by the then President Café Filho to serve as chairman of the New Federal Capital Location Commission, which was in charge of examining the general conditions of installation of the city to be built. Next, Café Filho approved the choice of the site of the new capital and delimited the area of the future new Federal District, ordering the commission to conduct the study of all. The Planning and Location Commission of the new Capital, under the presidency of José Pessoa until 1956, was responsible for choosing the exact location where Brasília stands today.

He died from natural causes in his home on 16 August 1959.

== See also ==
- Brazil during World War I
- Brazilian Army

== Bibliography ==
- McCann, Frank D. "Soldiers of the Patria, A History of the Brazilian Army, 1889-1937" Stanford University Press 2004 ISBN 0804732221
- Câmara, Hiram de Freitas. "Marechal José Pessôa: A força de um ideal" ("Marshal José Pessoa; The might of a dream") (in Portuguese) BibliEx (Brazilian Army Press) 1985 ISBN 8570110995
- Castro, Celso. "A invenção do exército brasileiro" ("The invention of Brazilian Army") (in Portuguese) Jorge Zahar 2002 ISBN 8571106827
- Couto, Ronaldo Costa. "Brasília Kubitschek de Oliveira" (in Portuguese) Editora Record, 2001 ISBN 8501061352
- Chris Chant & Richard Jones. "Tanks: Over 250 of the World's Tanks and Armoured Fighting Vehicles" Summertime Publishing Ltd 2004 ISBN 0760318719
- Lopez, Martial "Historique du 4ème Régiment de Dragons; au cours de la guerre contre l'Allemagne" (in French) Librairie Chapelot, 1920.
