= Fountain of Mundéu =

- Chafariz do Mundéu
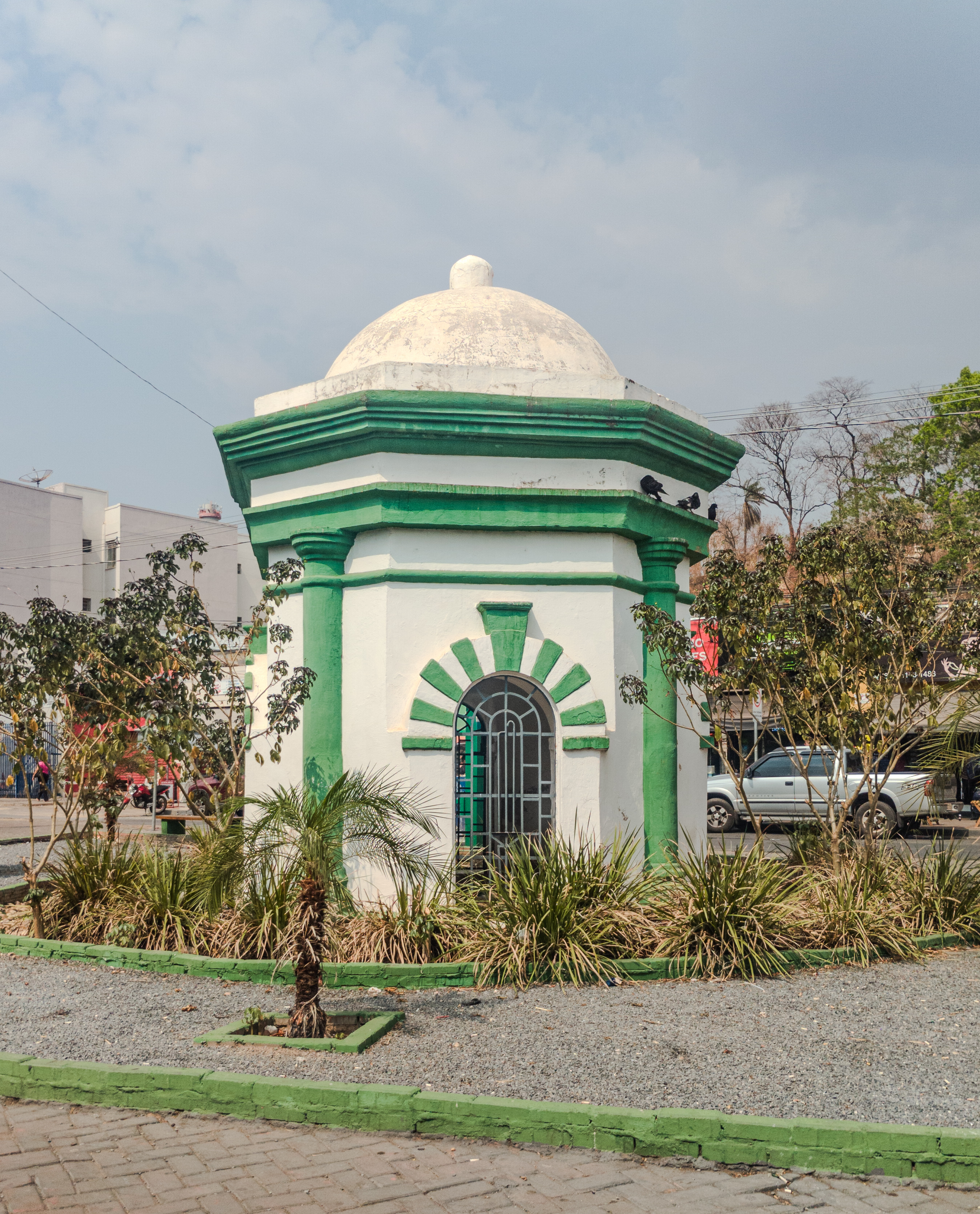

- Location within Brazil

General information
- Type: public fountain
- Architectural style: Eclectic, Neoclassical
- Location: Praça Bispo Dom José - Bandeirantes, Cuiabá - MT, 78010-100, Cuiabá, Mato Grosso, Brazil
- Coordinates: 15.600108°S 56.095631°W
- Opened: 1871
- Closed: 1910
- Owner: Municipality of Cuiabá

Technical details
- Floor count: 1

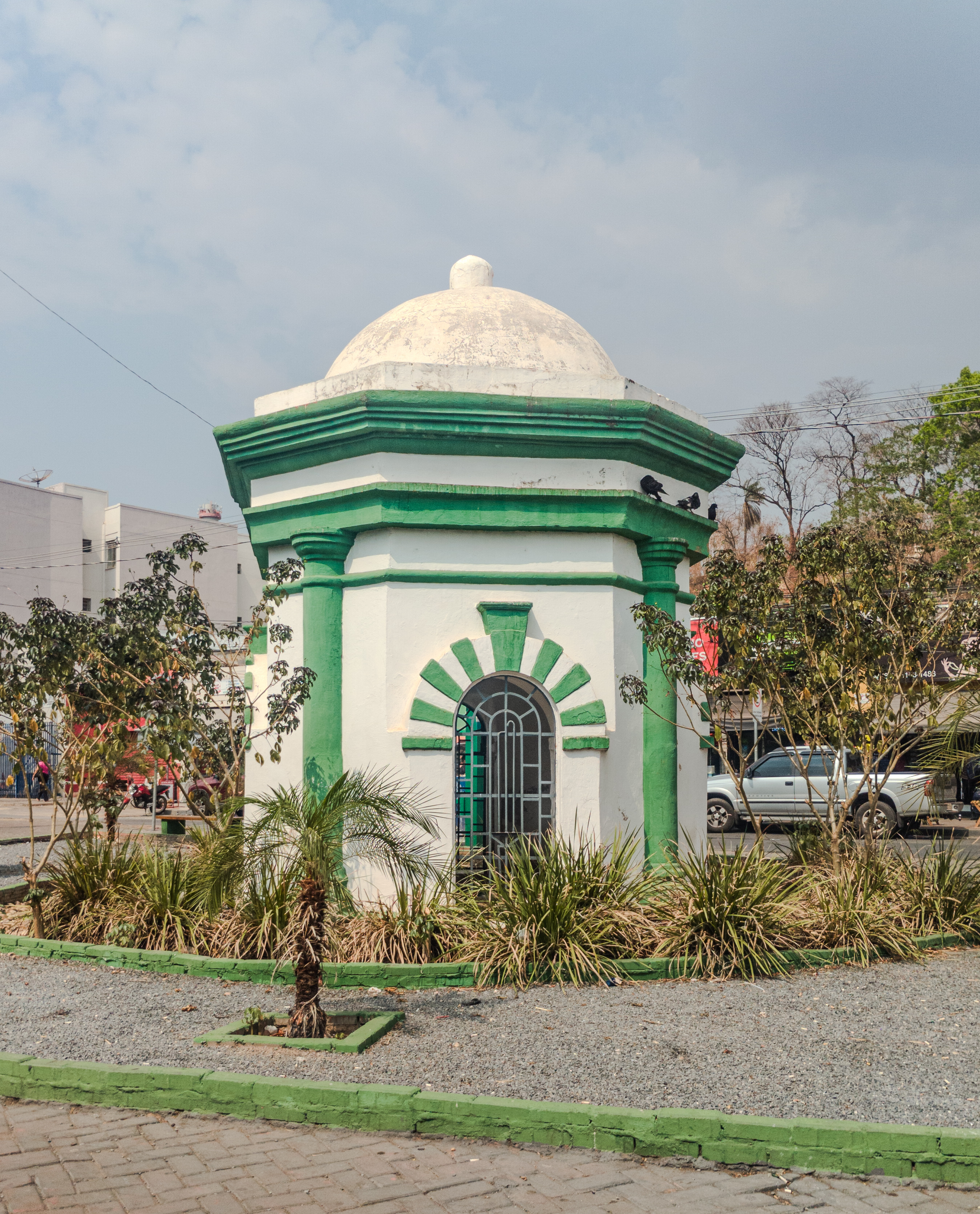
Chafariz do Mundéu in Cuiabá

The Fountain of Mundéu (Portuguese: Chafariz do Mundéu), originally known as the Fountain of the Largo da Conceição (Portuguese: Chafariz do Largo da Conceição), is a public fountain in Cuiabá, Mato Grosso, Brazil. The fountain takes its name from the Largo do Mundéu, the original name of Praça Bispo Dom José. It was commissioned by Francisco José Cardoso Júnior, president of the Mato Grosso, who recognized the need for a steady water supply in Cuiabá. Francisco Nunes da Cunha, a military engineer, designed the fountain and its associated water system. The fountain was built in a late, eclectic, Neoclassical style, and is one of numerous Neoclassical buildings in the Historic Center of Cuiabá. It was deactivated in 1910 but retained to store gardening equipment for the plaza. The fountain was photographed shortly after its construction, and retains its original structure and architectural details. It was listed as a state-level listed historic structure by Mato Grosso in 1980, and restored by the state of Mato Grosso in 2006.

== Location ==
The fountain is located at the center of Praça Bispo Dom José, formerly Largo do Mundéu or the Largo da Conceição, a small public square on Avenida Tenente Coronel Duarte in the city center of Cuiabá. The fountain, once surrounded by residences, is now confined to small square due to the intensive urbanization of Cuiaba. It is surrounded by high-rise residences and bus stops.

== History ==
Cuiabá was established in 1719. Cuiaba had, according to the Plano de Cuiabá do ano do 1777, six public fountains; a seventh at the Santa Casa da Misericordia is likely not recorded in the plan. Both the Portuguese colonial Imperial Brazilian governments south to expand the water system through various projects, none realized. Some homes had private wells, but most water was transported manually by slave labor. Water from the Prainha was likely polluted early in the history of Cuiabá by mercury left over from gold mining.

Francisco José Cardoso Júnior, president of the Mato Grosso from 1871 to 1872, both years of drought and water shortage in Cuiabá. Cardoso Júnior ordered the construction of a fountain for public use, and commissioned Francisco Nunes da Cunha, a military engineer, to find deeper and more reliable water sources. Construction on the fountain began in 1871. A small reservoir was built at the Quintal do Maranhão near the present-day Santa Casa de Misericórdia. The reservoir captured a small amount of water from spring, which was then conducted to the Fountain of Mundéu on lower ground. Homes facing the Largo do Mundéu, also known as the Largo da Conceição, dated to the colonial period and occupied a privileged position in the city; placement of the fountain in Mundéu offered wealthy residents closest access to it.

The fountain is the smallest example of Neoclassical architecture in the city, and followed the War Arsenal of Mato Grosso (1818), now known as the SESC Arsenal; the Santa Casa of Cuiabá; the State Treasury Building of Mato Grosso (1896), now the Mato Grosso Historical Museum; the Palace of Instruction (Palaçio da Instrução, 1913), the largest and most ornate example of the style in Cuiabá. A Neoclassical façade and exterior walls were also built around the Headquarters of the 1st Battalion of Military Police of Mato Grosso.

The fountain operated until 1910. It was still sat on a grassy, wide plaza surrounded by colonial-era residences in the 1920s and 1930s. The plaza was greatly reduced in size with the placement of a bus terminal along the avenue; the colonial-era buildings of Cuiabá were likewise replaced by modern structures. It was subsequently used to store gardening equipment for the maintenance of Praça Bispo Dom José. The Fountain of Mundéu was completely restored by the state government of Mato Grosso in 2006.

== Protected status ==
The Fountain of Mundéu was listed as a state-level historic structure by the State Secretary for Culture, Sports and Leisure of Mato Grosso (Secretaria de Estado de Cultura, Esporte e Lazer de Mato Grosso, SECEL) under listing no. 39/79 published January 7, 1980.

== Access ==
The fountain is located in a public square and may be visited.
