= Former State Treasury Building of Mato Grosso =

Historic building in Brazil

- Thesouro do Estado de Mato Grosso
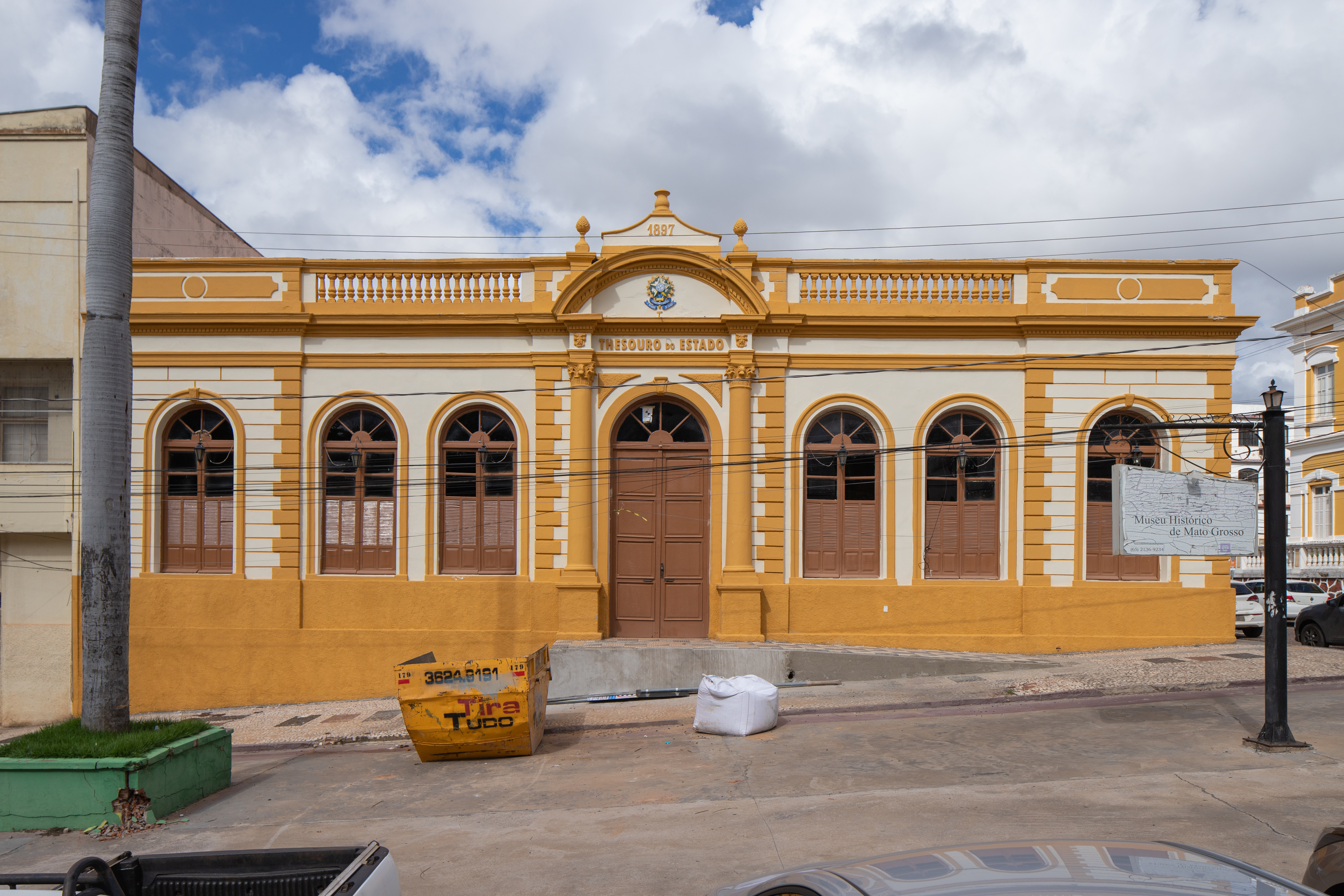
- Former State Treasury Building of Mato Grosso, now the Mato Grosso Historical Museum

- Location within Brazil
- Former names: State Public Library, Mato Grosso Secretary of Education and Culture, Barão de Melgaço School, Mato Grosso State Secretary of Tourism

General information
- Type: government building, museum building
- Architectural style: Neoclassical
- Location: Praça da República, 131 - Centro Norte, Cuiabá - MT, 78005-440, Cuiabá, Mato Grosso, Brazil
- Coordinates: 15.598449°S 56.096134°W
- Current tenants: Mato Grosso Historical Museum
- Opened: August 29, 1896
- Renovated: 2006
- Owner: State of Mato Grosso

Technical details
- Floor count: 1

The Former State Treasury Building of Mato Grosso (Portuguese: Thesouro do Estado de Mato Grosso) is a historic building in Cuiabá, Mato Grosso, Brazil. It sits on the Praça da República, a public square that was once the center of Portuguese colonial power. It was built in 1896 to house first the state treasury, and later numerous state government agencies. It was ultimately adapted in to the Mato Grosso Historical Museum in 2006, also managed by a state agency. The Treasury Building is one several Neoclassical buildings in Cuiabá. It sits in close proximity to the Palace of Instruction, built shortly afterwards in 1913, in a larger, more eclectic example of the style. The State Treasury Building was listed as a state-level listed historic structure by Mato Grosso in 1983.

== Location ==
The Former State Treasury Building is located on the Praça da República, a broad public square and the original center of colonial Portuguese power. It is in close proximity to other historic buildings of varying time of construction and style: the Neo-classical Palace of Instruction (Palaçio da Instrução, 1913); the Vargas-era Art Deco Brazilian Post and Telegraph Agency (1937); and the modernist Cathedral Basilica of Cuiabá (1973) and the high-rise Palácio do Comércio (1975).

== History ==
The State Treasury Building was built to house both the office of Public Works Repairs, Land, Mines, and Colonization (Reparação de Obras públicas, Terras, Minas e Colonização) and the State Treasury (Thesouro do Estado). It subsequently housed the State Public Library (1912-1914), the Mato Grosso Secretariat of Education and Culture, the Barão de Melgaço School (1970-1982) and the Secretariat of State Tourism (Fundação Cultural de Mato Grosso, 1983–2003). The structure underwent a significant renovation that was completed in December 2006, and became the home of the Mato Grosso Historical Museum.

== Structure ==
The State Treasury Building was built in the Neoclassical style. The style was introduced to Brazil by King John VI of Portugal (1816–26) in 1816 with the invitation of a group of French architects, notably Grandjean de Montigny (1776-1850). A group of Montigny's students in Brazil designed and built the Itamaraty Palace in Rio de Janeiro, and the style was widely imitated across Brazil. Numerous buildings and structures in Cuiabá were built in the Neoclassical style. All major government and education buildings were built in the style from its introduction in Rio de Janeiro to the early 20th century. It began with the War Arsenal of Mato Grosso (1818), now known as the SESC Arsenal; the Santa Casa; the Palace of Instruction (Palaçio da Instrução, 1913), the largest and most ornate example of the style in Cuiabá. A Neoclassical façade and exterior walls were built around the Headquarters of the 1st Battalion of Military Police of Mato Grosso; it is also found in smaller examples, such as the Fountain of Mundéu.

The building, like most in Cuiabá, is built on a foundation of pedra canga. It has a symmetric, one-story façade, in contrast to the much larger Palace of Instruction, which is oriented perpendicular to façade of the Treasury. The State Treasury Building has three windows at each side of a prominent entrance at center; the farthest windows are framed vertically by heavy corbels. The entrance is surmounted by a triangular pediment with a coat of arms.

== Mato Grosso History Museum ==
The collection of the Mato Grosso History Museum (Portuguese: Museu Histórico de Mato Grosso) was first located at the Palace of Instruction, located directly across from the State Treasury Building on the Praça da República. It drew from the collections of historical and cultural document across many municipalities of Mato Grosso. The Mato Grosso History Museum was founded on August 20, 1987. Its permanent exhibition covers the history of Mato Grosso from the arrival of the Bandeirantes through the Portuguese colonial period, the Empire of Brazil, the Republic of Brazil, and the Military Dictatorship (1966-1985). Several rooms are dedicated to the Paraguayan War; Mato Grosso was located both near the war and served as a location for the arsenal and a meeting point for troops.

== Protected status ==
State Treasury Building was listed as a state-level historic structure by the State Secretary for Culture, Sports and Leisure of Mato Grosso (Secretaria de Estado de Cultura, Esporte e Lazer de Mato Grosso, SECEL) on May 2, 1985.

== Access ==
The State Treasury Building functions as a museum and may be visited.

== See also ==
- SESC Arsenal
- Fountain of Mundéu
