= Roberto Simonsen =

Brazilian economist (1889–1948)

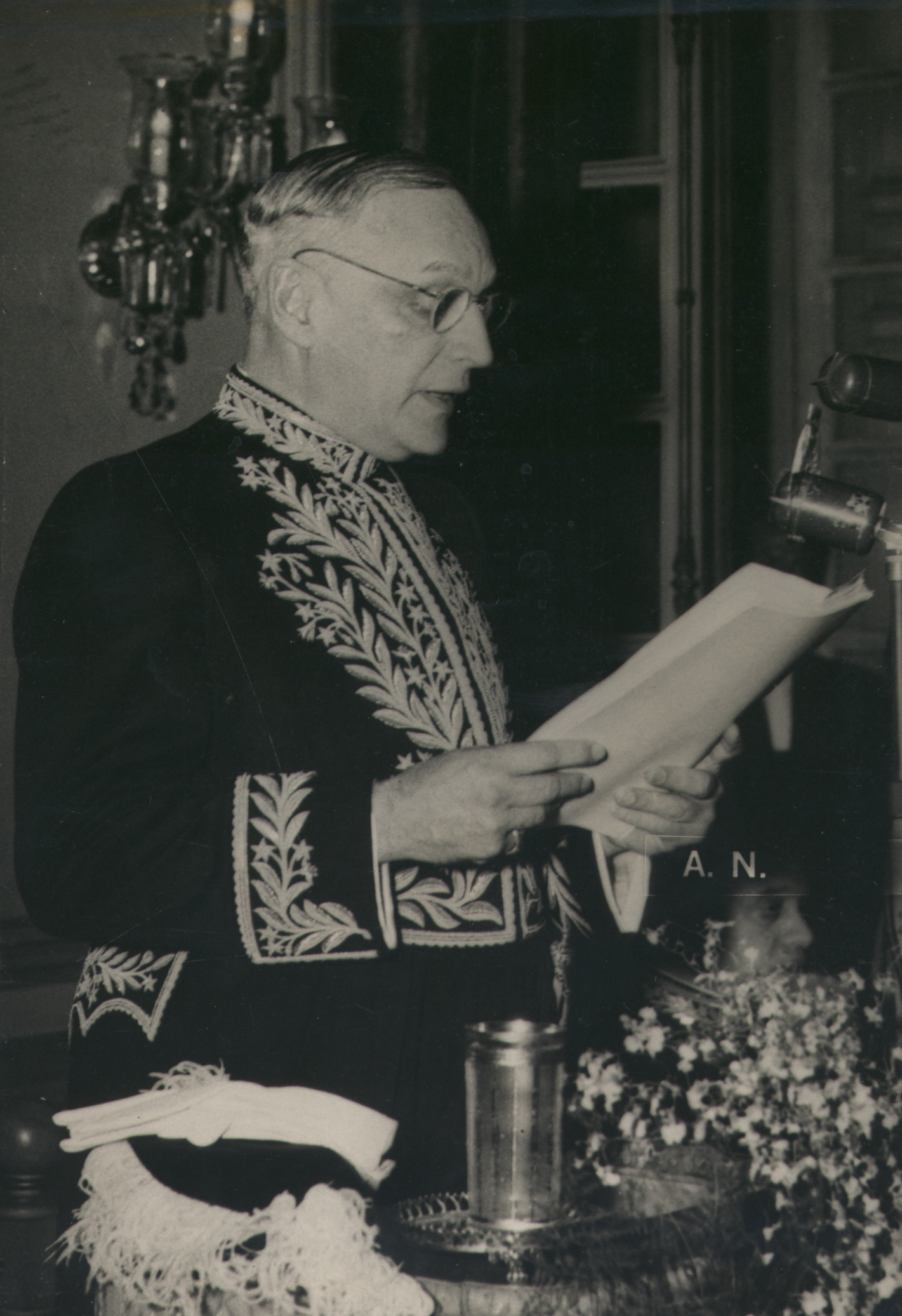
- Born: February 18, 1889; Santos, São Paulo (state), Brazil
- Died: May 25, 1948 (aged 59); Rio de Janeiro, Rio de Janeiro (state), Brazil
- Education: Polytechnic School of the University of São Paulo
- Occupations: Industrialist, politician, professor, writer
- Notable work: História econômica do Brasil (1937)

Roberto Cochrane Simonsen (February 18, 1889 – May 25, 1948) was a Brazilian engineer, economist, businessman, and politician. He was an advocate and early thinker of developmentalism in Brazil.

== Biography ==
Born in Santos into a wealthy family with ties to the Scottish nobility, Simonsen completed his secondary education at the Anglo-Brazilian School in São Paulo before enrolling at age 14 at the Polytechnic School, from which he earned a degree in civil engineering. He began working at the Southern Brazil Railway and was shortly thereafter appointed General Director of Public Works for the municipal government of Santos.

In 1912, he founded the Companhia Construtora de Santos. In 1919, he initiated his career in diplomacy. Through Simonsen's connection with the diplomat Pandiá Calógeras, his Companhia carried out the construction of headquarters for the Brazilian Army.

Simonsen participated in the Constitutionalist Revolution of 1932, contributing to the industrial and military mobilization of the state of São Paulo. After Vargas's military triumph over the constitutionalists, he took part in the creation and consolidation of the School of Sociology and Politics of São Paulo, where he taught economic history of Brazil. He served as federal deputee from 1933 to 1937, and as senator from 1947 to 1948.

He was a member of the National Geographic Society, of the Royal Geographic Society, of the Instituto Histórico e Geográfico Brasileiro, and of the Brazilian Academy of Letters.

Simonsen died while discoursing at the hall of the Brazilian Academy of Letters.

== Works ==
- O Município de Santos (1912)
- Os Melhoramentos Municipais de Santos (1912)
- Gado e a Carne no Brasil (1919)
- O Trabalho Moderno (1919)
- Calçamento de São Paulo (1923)
- À Margem da Profissão (1923)
- A Orientação Industrial Brasileira (1928)
- As Crises no Brasil (1930)
- As Finanças e a Indústria (1931)
- A Construção dos Quartéis para o Exército (1931)
- Rumo à Verdade (1933)
- Ordem Econômica e Padrão de Vida (1934)
- Aspectos da Economia Nacional (1935)
- História Econômica do Brasil (1937)
- A Indústria em face da Economia Nacional (1937)
- Aspectos da História Econômica do Café (1938)
- A Evolução Industrial do Brasil (1939)
- Objetivos da Engenharia Nacional (1939)
- Recursos Econômicos e Movimentos de População (1940)
- Níveis de Vida e a Economia Nacional (1940)
- As Indústrias e as Pesquisas Tecnológicas (1941)
- As Classes Produtoras de São Paulo e o Momento Nacional (1942)
- Ensaios Sociais Políticos e Econômicos (1943)
- As indústrias e as pesquisas tecnológicas (1943)
- O Plano Marshall e a América Latina (1947)
