= Forte de São Luís =

Fortified construction in Niterói, Brazil

- Niterói, Rio de Janeiro in Brazil
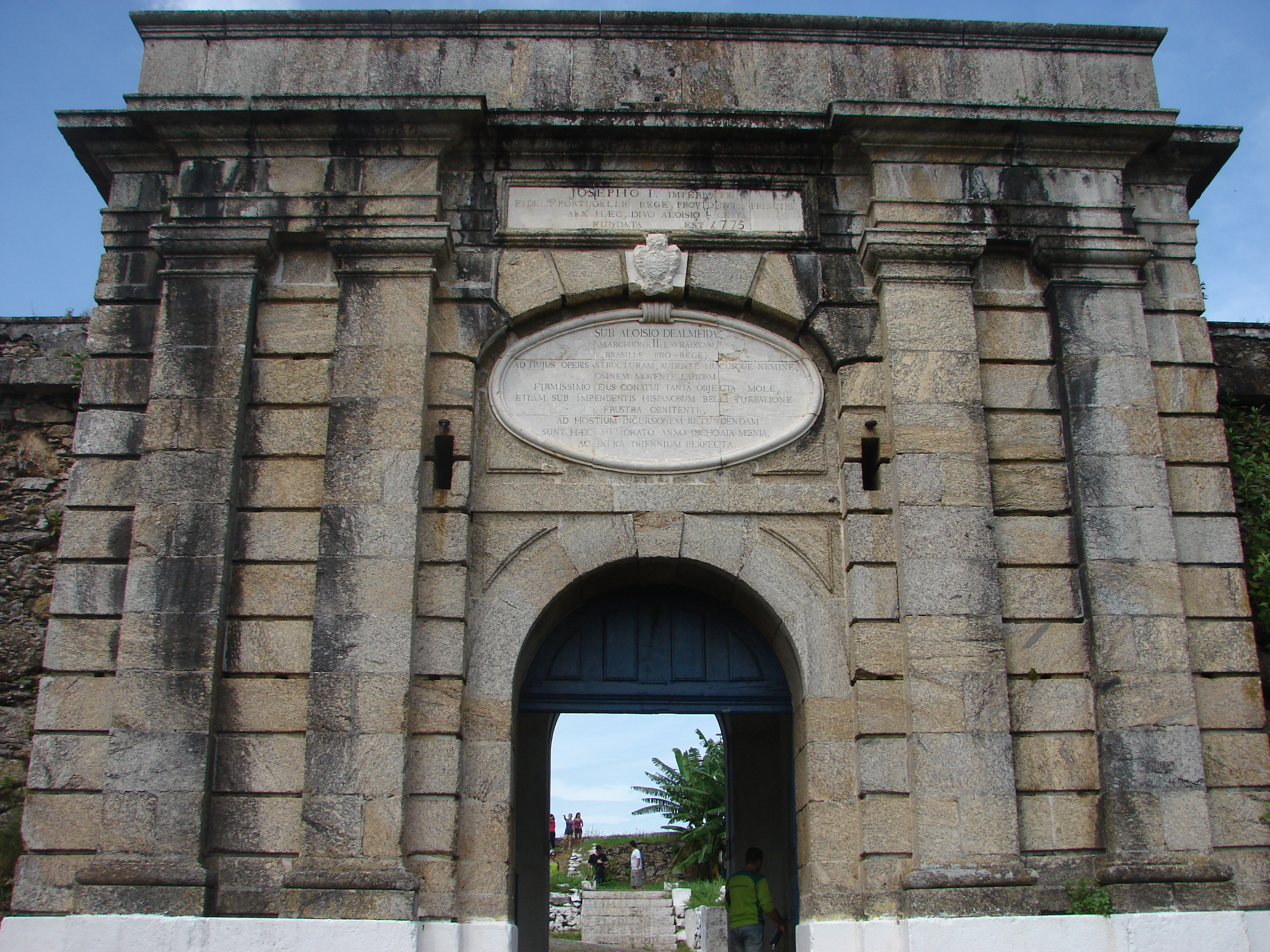
- Main entrance to the fort

Site information
- Type: Fort
- Open to the public: Yes

Location
- Location of Forte de São Luís in Brazil
- Coordinates: 22.934636°S 43.121014°W

Forte de São Luís is a fort located in Niterói, Rio de Janeiro in Brazil.

== See also ==
- Military history of Brazil
