= SESC Arsenal =

- Serviço Social do Comércio Arsenal
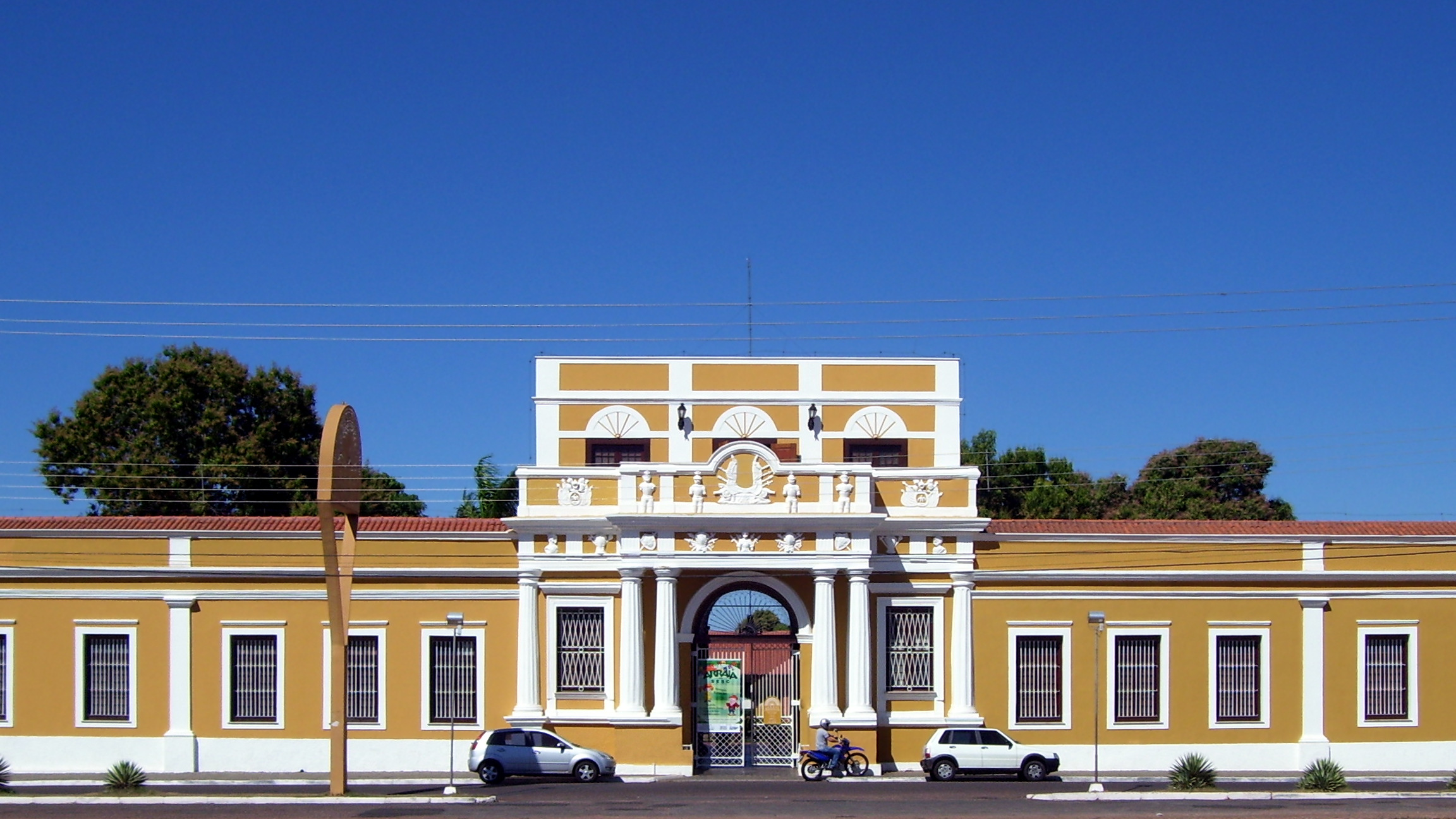
- SESC Arsenal, Cuiabá, Mato Grosso, Brazil.

- Location within Brazil
- Former names: Real Trem de Guerra de Cuiabá, Arsenal de Guerra de Cuiabá

General information
- Type: arsenal
- Architectural style: Neoclassical
- Location: Rua 13 de Junho, 1435 - Centro Sul, Cuiabá - Mato Grosso, 78020-000, Cuiabá, Mato Grosso, Brazil
- Coordinates: 15.608597204919992°S 56.10360358721072°W
- Opened: 1818
- Renovated: 1848, 1989-2002
- Owner: Municipality of Cuiabá

Technical details
- Floor count: 1

The SESC Arsenal, originally known as the Real Trem de Guerra and later the War Arsenal (Portuguese: Arsenal de Guerra), is a former arsenal in Cuiabá, Mato Grosso, Brazil. King John VI of Portugal mandated the creation of the arsenal in Cuiabá in 1818, shortly before the Independence of Brazil in 1822. It was completed and subsequently expanded in the 1840s in response to territorial disputes with the newly independent Spanish states.

The Arsenal played an important role during the Paraguayan War (1864–1870) as a center for weapons manufacture and repair of both Brazilian and captured Paraguayan weaponry. The Arsenal later became a prison and military headquarters. The Social Service of Commerce (SESC) took ownership of the arsenal in 1989, and renovated the structure from 1989 to 2002 into an artisans market and cultural center under the name SESC Arsenal.

The Arsenal was built in the French Neoclassical design of 19th century Brazil, and follows the same plan and appearance of government buildings of the period in Rio de Janeiro, many designed by Grandjean de Montigny. The SESC Arsenal has a large internal courtyard now planted with a garden. Its façade is painted in a distinct ocher with Neoclassical reliefs in white. The Arsenal was listed as a state-level listed historic structure by Mato Grosso in 1984.

== History ==
King John VI mandated the creation of the Real Trem de Guerra in Cuiabá by a Royal Charter of 18 April 1818. Cuiabá maintained a strategic position in the 19th century due to Spanish territorial disputes at the end of its rule over the Viceroyalty of Peru, and later the emergence of the independent states of Paraguay (1811), and more distantly, Argentina (1810). Arms were produced, stored, and maintained at the Real Trem, or royal arsenal. The decree gave specific instructions for its design and operation to be based entirely on the Real Trem of the Captaincy of São Paulo. Captain-General Francisco de Paula Maggessi Tavares de Carvalho (1769–1847) began construction of the arsenal on 22 April 1819, shortly before the Independence of Brazil in 1822. It was completed in 1832 under the newly-formed government of the Empire of Brazil in response to the territorial disputes in the Platine regions, which included Paraguay, Bolivia, and Argentina. The War Train was renamed the Arsenal de Guerra da Província de Mato Grosso on 15 November 1831; its first director was Brigadier Jerônimo Joaquim Nunes (1769–1837). Nunes was the second president of the provisional government of the province of Mato Grosso, holding the office from 1828 to 1830.

Work on the arsenal continued throughout the mid-19th century, especially as the governors of Mato Grosso came into conflict with the government of Paraguay. The Artifices Apprentice Company (Portuguese: Companhia de Aprendizes de Artífices) was installed at the arsenal in 1842. Apprentices were drawn from Mato Grosso and learned the trade of repair, maintenance, and build of small arms, and the company was the first official professional education initiative in the province of Mato Grosso. The arsenal was expanded in 1848 with the addition of flanking balconies. The Arsenal rose to full importance during the Paraguayan War (1864-1870) as a center for weapons manufacture and repair. Workers repaired both Brazilian and Paraguayan weaponry, which was returned to the battlefront for use in combat.

The Proclamation of the Republic in 1889 led to regional disputes across Brazil. Mato Grosso, similar to Bahia and the state of São Paulo, was the scene of pro- and anti-republican conflicts as well as an armed movement to establish Mato Grosso as an independent country in 1892. Independence forces took up arms and overthrew state president Manuel Murtinho on 1 February 1892. However, on 7 May, Generoso Ponce, at the head of 4,000 men, began the siege of the opposing forces in the capital and dominated them in less than a week. On 22 June, Corumbá fell. With his Republican Party victorious, Murtinho returned to power. The Arsenal then became a prison, with prisoners serving sentences cleaning the squares, streets, streams of Cuiabá, as well as work on the Arsenal itself. The convicts were called galés or calcetas, but workers at the Arsenal were complex, consisting of a mix of salaried laborers, slave laborers, and other forms of compulsory labor.

The 16th Battalion of Caçadores, a light infantry battalion, took control of the Arsenal at the end of 1892. It was then used as an arms depot by the 9th Battalion of Construction Engineers. The Social Service of Commerce (SESC), a Brazilian non-profit, took over the complex in 1989. SESC adapted the Arsenal into a cultural center and artisans market later named Espaço Cultural SESC. The renovation spanned from 1989 to 2002. The market is designated a "bulixo", a local Cuiabá name for emporiums that sold miscellaneous goods.

== Structure ==
The Arsenal was built in the French Neoclassical design of the 19th century. It differs little from the Neoclassical government buildings of Rio de Janeiro, many designed or influenced by Grandjean de Montigny. The style was popular in Cuiabá, and all major government and education buildings in the 19th and early 20th century were built in a Neoclassical or eclectic Neoclassical style. The War Arsenal was followed by the State Treasury Building of Mato Grosso (1896), now the Mato Grosso Historical Museum, the Santa Casa, and the Palace of Instruction (Palácio da Instrução, 1913). Other examples are found in the façade of the Headquarters of the 1st Battalion of Military Police of Mato Grosso and the Fountain of Mundéu.

The Arsenal was built by local engineers who utilized building materials from Mato Grosso. The interior is protected by an uninterrupted porch. The flat areas of the façade are painted in ocher with reliefs in white; the color scheme accentuates the composition and classic linearity of the building.

The military history of the building is preserved in the frieze of the arsenal, which has the insignia of the Casa Militar in symmetrical reliefs. The garden preserves the cannons inherited from the Brazilian Army. Successive renovations and expansions modified interior aspects but few structural changes were made to the original structure.

=== Interior ===
The Arsenal has a large internal courtyard with a garden. The interior of the building is protected by an uninterrupted porch. A spatial lattice was designed by Ademar Poppi and "gains in lightness over the squat figure of the Market." The marquee of the interior courtyard was designed by Ernesto Galbiatto and "highlights the orthogonality of the Arsenal's internal courtyard". They courtyard is planted with mango trees, one of the symbols of Cuiabá.

== Protected status ==
The SESC Arsenal was listed as a state-level historic structure by the State Secretary for Culture, Sports and Leisure of Mato Grosso (Secretaria de Estado de Cultura, Esporte e Lazer de Mato Grosso, SECEL) under listing no. 61/83 published 1 January 1984.

== Access ==
The former arsenal functions as a tourism and cultural center and may be visited.
