= Timeline of Cuiabá history =

History of Cuiabà

The following is a timeline of the history of the city of Cuiabá, Mato Grosso, Brazil.

== Pre-colonial period ==
- The great Cuiabá region was home to the Bororo peoples, among others.

== 18th century ==
- 1719 – April 8th. Gold discovery at Forquilha on the Coxipó River as reported by the bandeirante Pascoal Moreira Cabral; the date is used to commemorate the founding of Cuiabá
- 1719 – Cabral built first chapel in area of Cuiabá dedicated to Our Lady of Peñafrancia
- 1722
  - October. Discovery of gold on the farm of Miguel Sutil on the hill of the present-day Church of Rosário and São Benedito
  - "Vila Real do Senhor Bom Jesus de Cuiabá" created by Royal Provision of 1722
- 1726
  - Arrival of Captain-General Governor Rodrigo César de Menezes of the Captaincy of São Paulo, representative of the Kingdom of Portugal
  - Construction of Church of Our Lady of Good Delivery, a chapel
- 1727
  - January 1st. César de Menezes elevates Cuiabá to the category of town (vila) under the name "Vila Real do Senhor Bom Jesus de Cuiabá", places a pillory as a symbol of Portuguese royal power
  - Construction of the Church of Rosário and São Benedito
- 1732 – End of gold production
- 1745 – December 6. Territorial Prelature of Cuiabá established from the Diocese of São Sebastião do Rio de Janeiro
- 1748 – Creation of the Captaincy of Mato Grosso
- 1751 – Arrival of the 1st Captain-General, Antônio Rolim de Moura Tavares
- 1751 – Tavares establishes Vila Bela da Santíssima Trindade as capital of the Captaincy of Mato Grosso
- 1781 – First Chapel of Saint Gonsalo in Prainha, later the Church of Saint Gonçalo
- 1787 – First known depictions of the city of Cuiabá
- 1790 – Philosophical Journey Passage of Alexandre Rodrigues Ferreira leaves detailed description of Cuiabá

== 19th century ==
- 1818
  - September 7. Declaration of the Independence of Brazil in the state of São Paulo; Cuiabá initially remains part of the Kingdom of Portugal
  - Opening of the War Arsenal by the Portuguese Crown, now the SESC Arsenal
  - September 17. Elevation of the Village of Cuiabá to the category of city (cidade) by the Portuguese Crown
- 1822 – Cuiabá becomes part of the Empire of Brazil
- 1825 – Population of Cuiabá: 4,287
- 1826 – July 15. Territorial Prelature of Cuiabá elevated to Diocese of Cuiabá
- 1834 – May 30. Rusga, a popular revolt against the remaining Portuguese, who controlled businesses in Mato Grosso and the Municipal Guard of Cuiabá
- 1835
  - July 3. First Provincial Legislative Assembly of Mato Grosso, held at the Provincial Assembly of Mato Grosso building in Cuiabá
  - August 28. Cuiabá becomes capital of the Province of Mato Grosso, replacing Vila Bela da Santíssima Trindade
- 1850 – Population of Cuiabá: almost 11,0000
- 1864
  - Start of the Paraguayan War; Cuiabá threatened with invasion and serves as arsenal military base for Brazilian campaigns
  - November 2. Opening of Piedade Cemetery, the first municipal cemetery in the city
- 1870
  - End of Paraguayan War
  - Opening of inland navigation to Cuiabá
- 1870 – End of Empire of Brazil, establishment of First Brazilian Republic
- 1896 – August 29. Opening of State Treasury Building of Mato Grosso, a multiuse government building

== 20th century ==
- 1910 – March 10: Diocese of Cuiabá becomes Metropolitan Archdiocese of Cuiabá
- 1914 – August 15: Inauguration of Palace of Instruction, a large secondary school in the city center
- 1920s – Renovations to the façades of the Old Cathedral of Cuiabá and Church of the Rosário and São Benedito
- 1921
  - May 22. The Mato Grosso Academy of Letters established under the name Mato Grosso Center for Letters
  - Construction of the Eucharistic Shrine of Our Lady of Good Delivery on site of chapel of Church of Our Lady of Dispatch
- 1937-45 – Installation of interventor Júlio Müller; expansion of Avenida Getúlio Vargas and construction of the "Official Works"
- 1942 – May 23. Opening of Cine Teatro Cuiabá, the first large cinema in the city
- 1958 – Demolition of Old Alencastro Palace (Palácio do Governo), Tax Station, and Barão de Diamantino Palace for the construction of the modernist Alencastro Palace
- 1962 – Opening of Avenida Ten. Cel. Duarte (Av. da Prainha)
- 1965
  - 18 December. Inauguration of Palácio Alencastro
- 1968 – Demolition of the Old Cathedral
- 1975 – Federal listing (tombamento) of the Church of Our Lady of the Rosary and Saint Benedict
  - October 11. Division of Mato Grosso and creation of Mato Grosso do Sul state
- 1987 – Federal listing (tombamento) of the Historic Center of Cuiabá

== 21st century ==
- 2001 - Foundation of Cuiabá Esporte Clube, Cuiabá's team within Campeonato Brasileiro Série A
- 2006 - Opening of Mato Grosso History Museum in the former State Treasury Building of Mato Grosso
- 2014 - April 26. Opening of Arena Pantanal, the largest soccer (association football) stadium in Cuiabá
- 2020 - Beginning of COVID-19 pandemic in Brazil, leading to 20,068 deaths in Cuiabá
