= Presbyterian Church of Cuiabá =

- Igreja Presbiteriana de Cuiabá
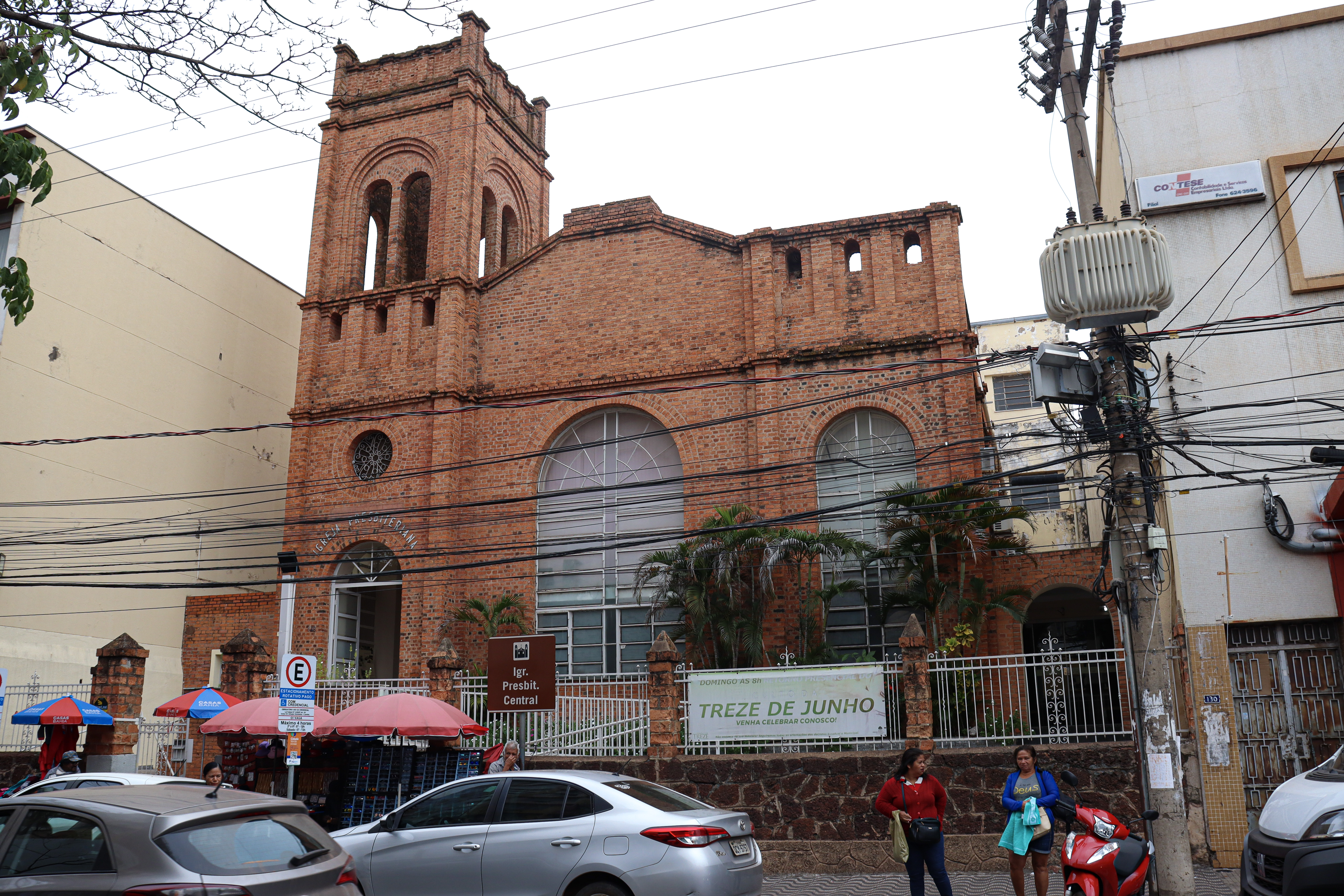

- Location within Brazil
- 15.59898605763305°S 56.09624783765298°W
- Location: Cuiabá
- Address: Rua 13 de Junho, 148 - Centro Norte, Cuiabá - Mato Grosso, 78005-250
- Country: Brazil
- Language: Portuguese
- Denomination: Presbyterian

Architecture
- Functional status: Active

Clergy
- Priest: Rafael Gustavo Santos Souza

The Presbyterian Church of Cuiabá (Portuguese: Igreja Presbiteriana de Cuiabá) is an early 20th-century Presbyterian church in Cuiabá, Mato Grosso, Brazil.

Protestant missions began in Cuiabá in 1891. Rev. Philippe Landes and Rev. Franklin Grahan arrived after this period. João Pedro Dias, a local businessman, was an early supporter of the church. He is also noted for the installation of the first telephone company and the first supplier of electricity from a boiler in the city. Dias used his considerable resources and family connections to support the Presbyterian mission, and hosted worship services in his home. Presbyterianism in Cuiabá consolidated under Rev. Philippe Landes, who arrived on August 15, 1915. Rev. Adan Martin and his wife joined the group three years later.

The First Presbyterian Church of Cuiabá was founded on October 12, 1920, and is the oldest Protestant church in Cuiabá. The church board sought land for a church on Rua 13 de Junho, a short distance from the Praça da República, and purchased a plot for $6,000,000 (6 contos de réis) from João Pedro Dias. The board borrowed a further $6,000,000 (6 contos de réis) from the South Brazil Presbyterian Mission. The foundation stone was place on September 7, 1921. The church was subsequently used for missions in Mato Grosso; numerous Presbyterian church in Mato Grosso and Mato Grosso do Sul trace their origin to the church in Cuiabá.

== Protected status ==
The Presbyterian Church of Cuiabá was listed as a state-level historic structure by the State Secretary for Culture, Sports and Leisure of Mato Grosso (Secretaria de Estado de Cultura, Esporte e Lazer de Mato Grosso, SECEL) under listing no. 61/83 published January 1, 1984.

== Access ==
The Presbyterian Church of Cuiabá is open to the public and may be visited.
