= Cuiabá =

Capital city of Mato Grosso, Brazil

- Municipality
- Municipality of Cuiabá
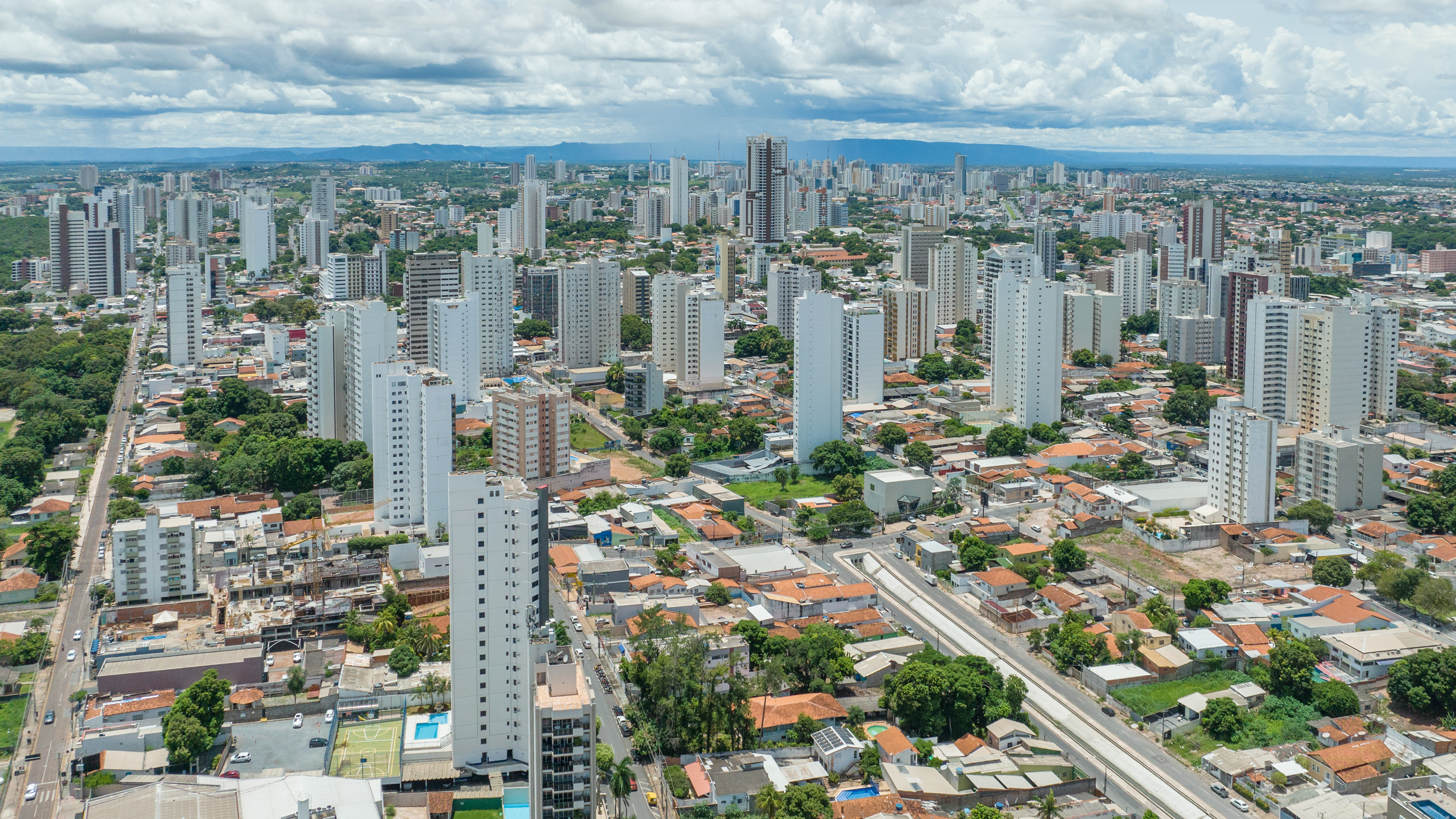
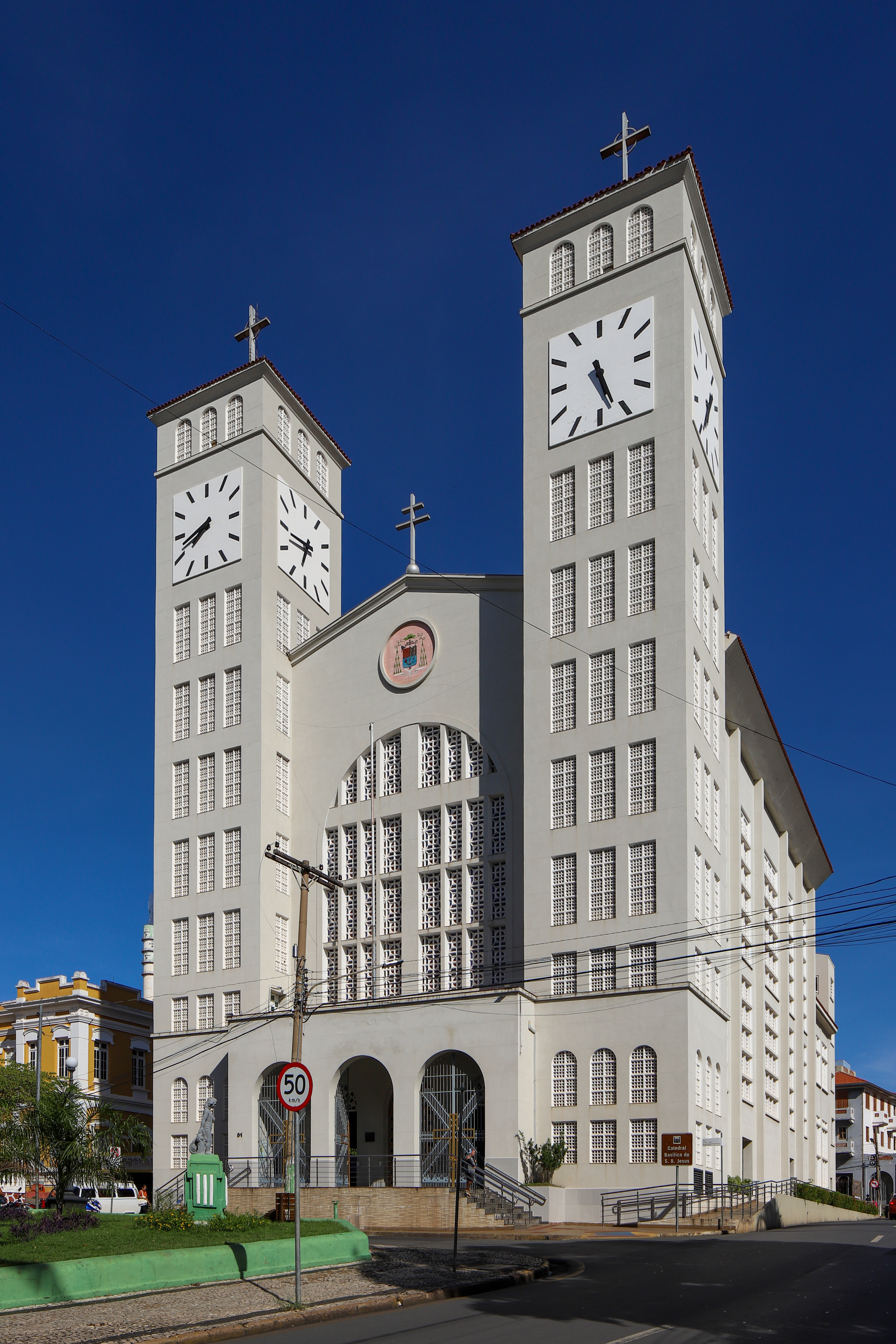
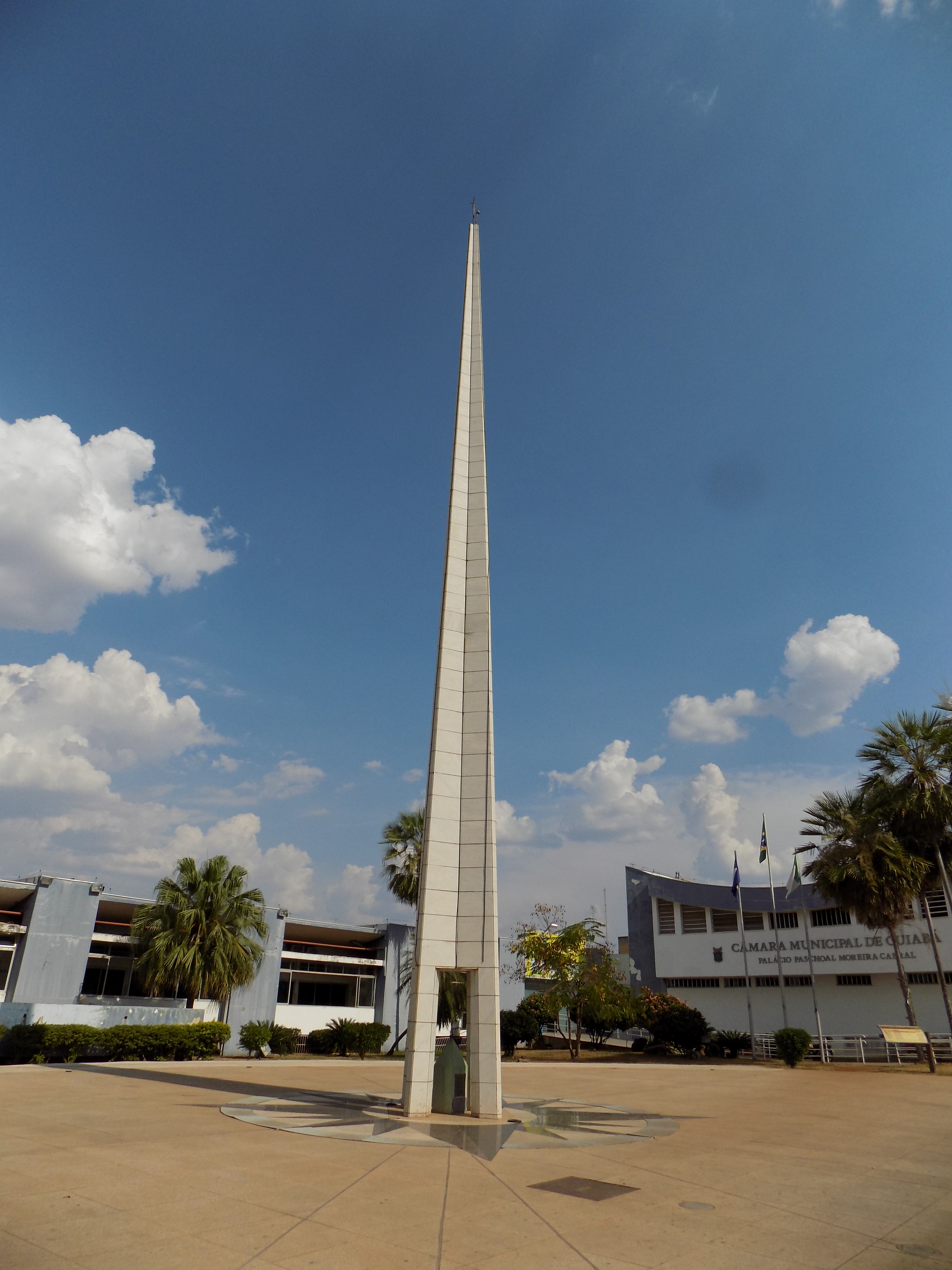
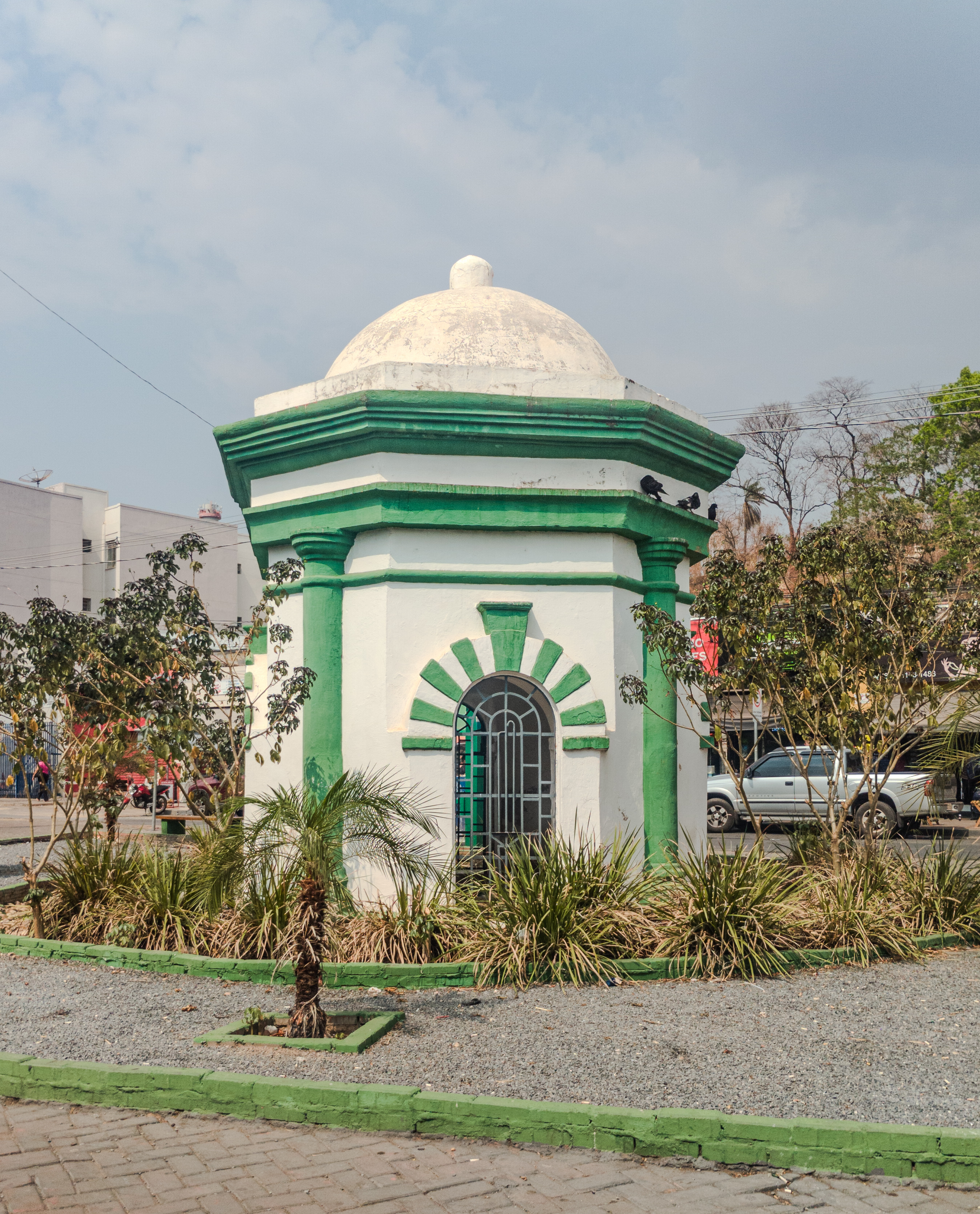
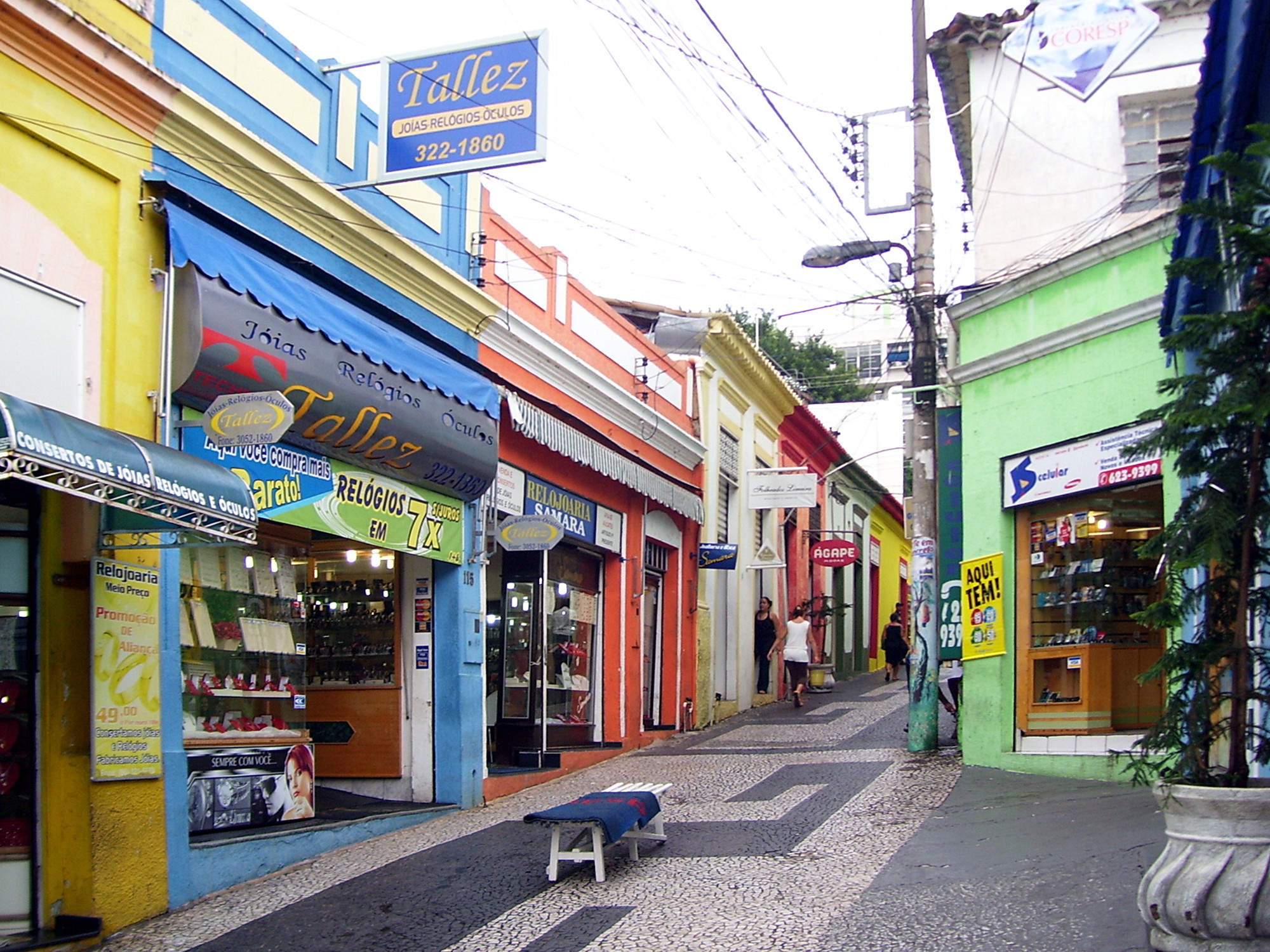
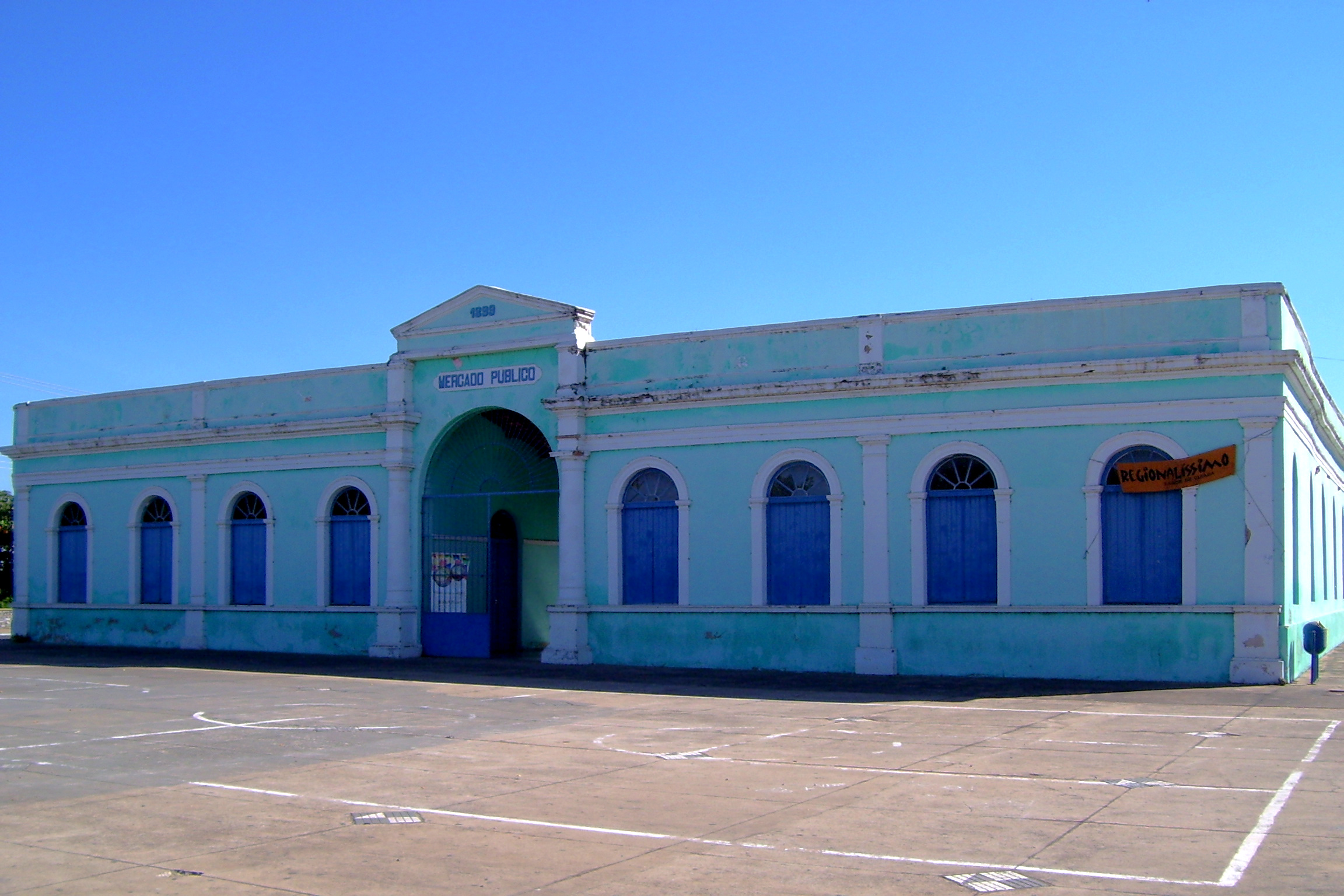
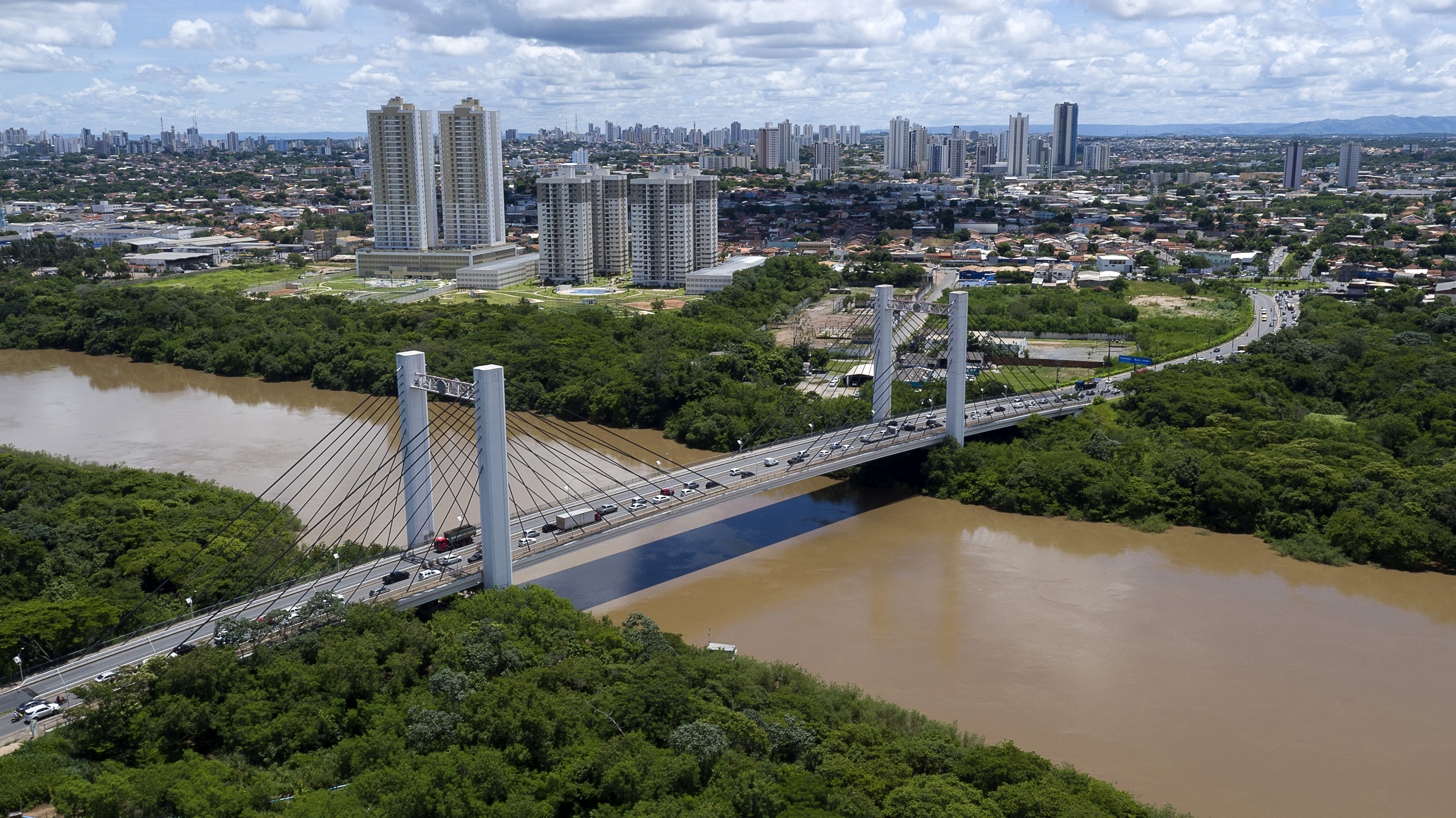
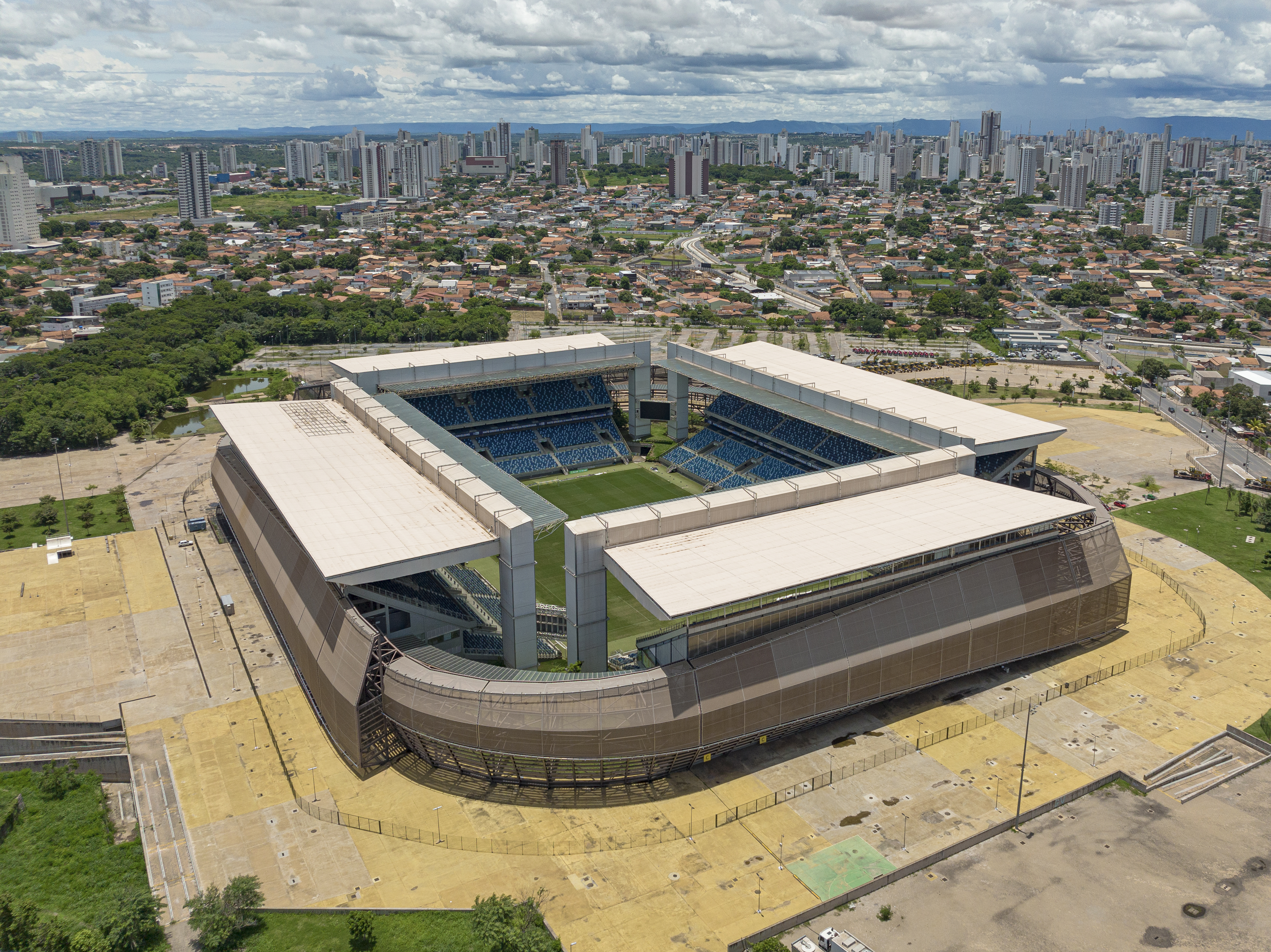
- Skyline of Cuiabá Cuiabá Cathedral Geodetic Center of South America Fountain of Mundéu Historic Center Cuiabá River Museum Sérgio Motta Bridge Arena Pantanal

- Flag Coat of arms
- Nickname: Cidade Verde ("Green City")
- Motto: Capital da Amazônia Meridional ("Capital of the Southern Amazon")
- Location in Mato Grosso

- Location in Brazil
- Coordinates: 15°35′45″S 56°05′49″W
- Country: Brazil
- Region: Central-West
- State: Mato Grosso
- Founded: April 8, 1719

Government
  - Mayor: Abilio Brunini (PL)

Area
  - Municipality: 3,291 km^{2} (1,271 sq mi)
- Elevation: 165 m (541 ft)

Population (2025)
  - Municipality: 691,875
  - Density: 210.2/km^{2} (544.5/sq mi)
  - Metro: 1,086,513
- Demonym: cuiabano

Racial makeup (2022)
  - Pardo: 54.92%
  - White: 30.71%
  - Black: 13.59%
  - Asian Brazilians: 0.54%
  - Indigenous: 0.23%
- Time zone: UTC-4 (UTC-4)
- Postal code: from 78000-001 to 78109-999
- Area code: +55 65
- HDI (2010): 0.785 – high
- Website: www.cuiaba.mt.gov.br

Cuiabá (Brazilian Portuguese pronunciation: [kujaˈba]) is the capital city and the largest city of the Brazilian state of Mato Grosso. It is located near the geographical centre of South America and also forms the metropolitan area of Mato Grosso, along with the neighbouring town of Várzea Grande. The city's name is an indigenous Bororo word meaning 'arrow-fishing', The city was founded in 1719, during the gold rush, and it has been the state capital since 1818. The city is a trading centre for an extensive cattle-raising and agricultural area. The capital is among the fastest-growing cities in Brazil, followed by the growth of agribusiness in Mato Grosso, despite the recession that is affecting Brazilian industries. Cuiabá was one of the host cities for the 2014 FIFA World Cup.

Cuiabá is the heart of an urban area that also includes the state's second largest city, Várzea Grande. The city is the seat of the Federal University of Mato Grosso and the largest football stadium of the state, Arena Pantanal.

The city is a rich mix of European, African and Native American influences and numerous museums reflect this. Cuiabá is also notable for its cuisine, dance, music and craftwork. Known as the "Southern gate to the Amazon", Cuiabá experiences a hot humid tropical climate.

== History ==
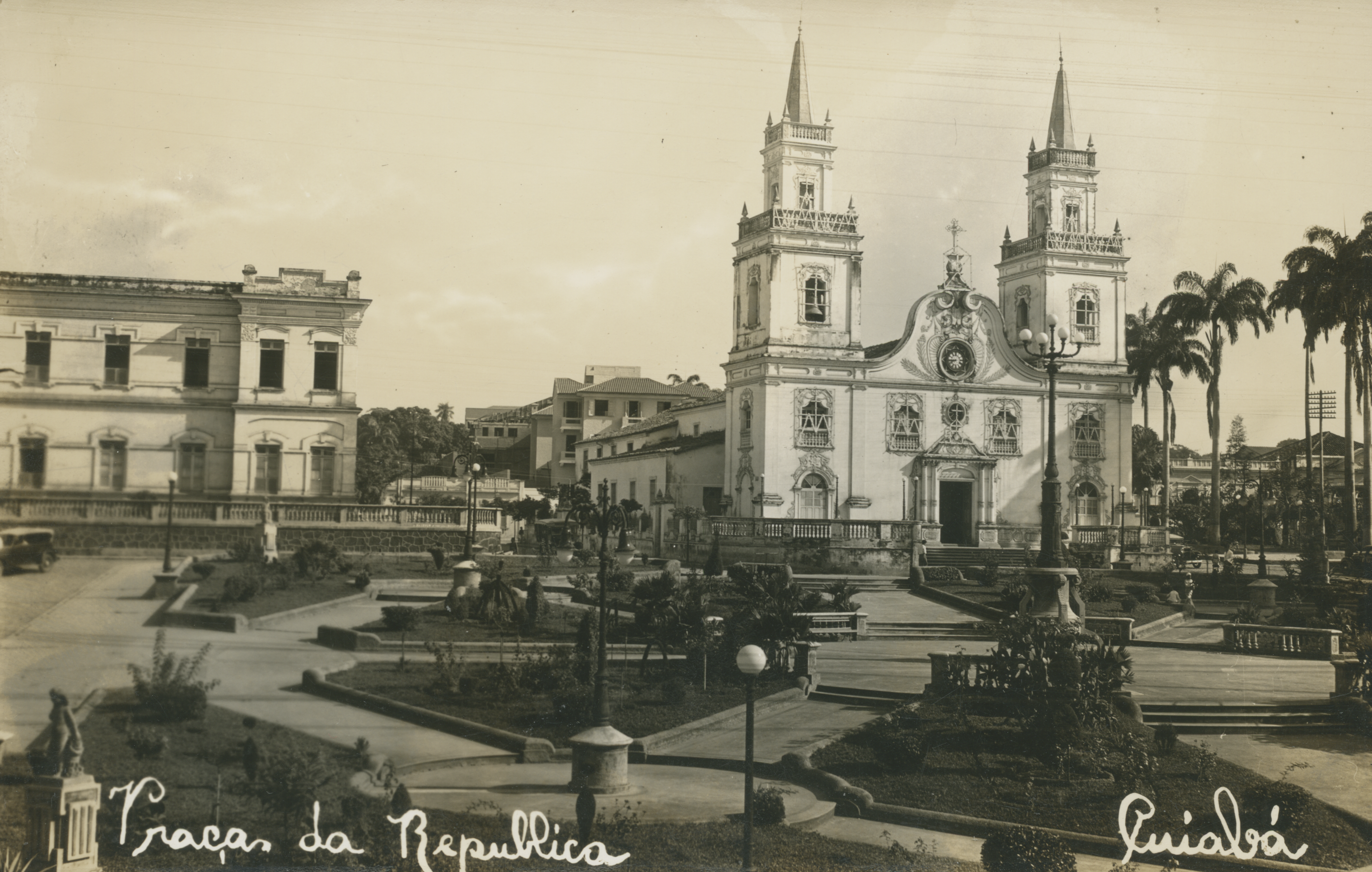
Praça da República with the now-demolished Cathedral of Senhor Bom Jesus de Cuiabá, 1941

Cuiabá, 1976. National Archives of Brazil.

=== Colonial period ===
The first Portuguese explorers to Cuiabá were bandeirantes, explorers, slavers, and fortune hunters based in the São Paulo region. The bandeirantes aided Brazil's great expansion westward, including to the Mato Grosso region. Manoel de Campos Bicudo, a bandeirante from São Paulo, visited the Cuiabá region in 1673 and 1682. He founded the first village in the region where the Coxipó River flows into Cuiabá, and named it São Gonçalo Beira-Rio.

Pascoal Moreira Cabral, a bandeirante of Sorocaba, São Paulo, arrived at the site in 1718 and found it abandoned. He travelled up the Coxipó to enslave indigenous peoples, and fought a battle with the Coxiponé Indians, and lost. The bandeirantes returned down Coxipó, however, found gold, and enslaved indigenous people of the region for mining on the site. Cabral informed the Captaincy of São Paulo of his discovery in a letter dated April 8, 1719. He applied to be "guarda‐mor regente", or guardian and supervisor of the mines. A gold rush immediately followed Cabral's letter with prospectors mainly coming from the São Paulo region. Cabral "manag[ed] disputes and problems of all kinds" as guardian of the mines until his death in 1724.

Cuiabá was founded on January 1, 1727 by Rodrigo César de Menezes, then the "captain" of the captaincy of São Paulo in the aftermath of the discovery of gold mines. It was officially called the Vila Real do Senhor Bom Jesus de Cuiabá, a name taken from the district founded two years earlier. The Church of Our Lady of the Rosary was built at the time in the centre of the little town marked the location of a rich seam of gold. However, in 1746 much of the town was destroyed by an earthquake. Dom Antônio Rolim de Moura Tavares (1709–1782), the first Count of Azambuja, arrived in 1751 to serve as governor of the newly created Captaincy of Mato Grosso by King John V of Portugal. Tavares served in the position from 1751 to 1765, and founded Vila Bela da Santíssima Trindade as the new capital of the captaincy.

=== 19th century ===
Cuiabá was elevated to township status in 1818. It became the capital of the Province of Mato Grosso in 1835 under the Empire of Brazil, replacing Vila Bela da Santíssima Trindade. Many residents of Santíssima Trindade left for Cuiabá, leaving behind houses, commercial establishments, and slaves behind in the old capital.

From the late eighteenth century, until the time of the Paraguayan War (1864–1870), the town remained small and was in decline. The war, however, brought some infrastructure and a brief period of economic boom, with Cuiabá supplying sugar, foodstuffs, and timber to the Brazilian troops. After the war, the town was once again forgotten by the rest of the country, to such an extent that the Imperial and later the Republican governments of Brazil used to use it as a site of exile for troublesome politicians. Isolation allowed it to preserve many of the oldest Brazilian ways of life until well into the twentieth century.

=== 20th and 21st century ===
Starting in 1930, the isolation was diminished, with the construction of roads and later with the advent of aviation. The town became a city and would grow quite rapidly from 1960 onwards, after the establishment of the newly built Brazilian capital in Brasília.

In the 1970s and 1980s, the pace of growth would continue to increase as agriculture became commercialized, using the roads to transport soybeans and rice produced in the state in order to be sold abroad. The growth was such that from 1960 to 1980 the small town of 50,000 inhabitants grew into a giant, with more than a quarter of a million inhabitants (including those from the surrounding area and towns).

Since 1990, the rate of population growth has decreased, as other towns in the state have begun to attract more immigration than the capital. Tourism has emerged as a source of income and began to become a relevant area of the country, unlike before, when it was practically uninhabited. In 2023, Cuiabá was already considered one of the ten best cities in the country to live in, according to a UN study; it was also considered the second Brazilian city that most advanced in the last decade.

== Geography ==
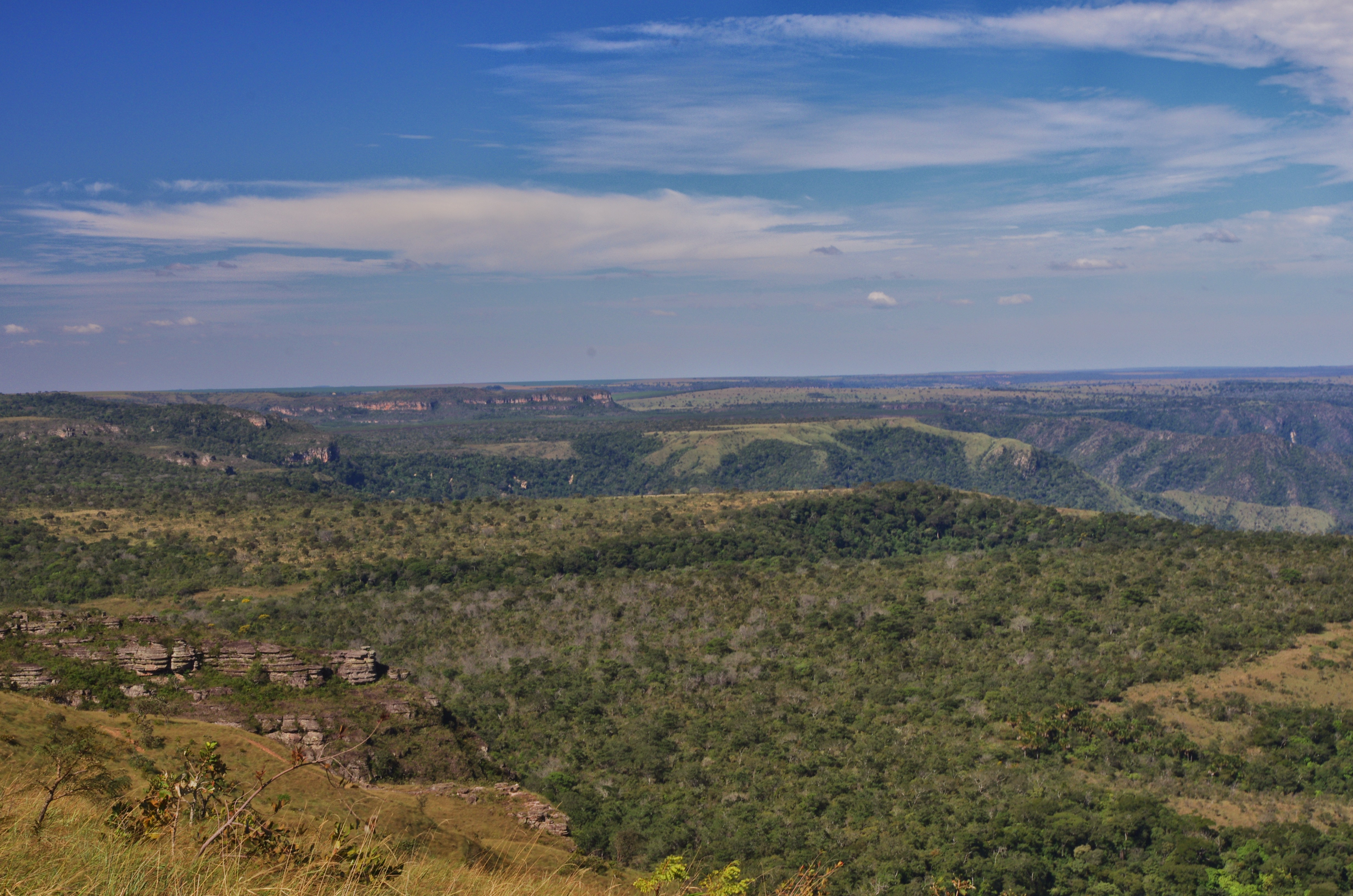
Chapada dos Guimarães National Park, located entirely within the municipality of Cuiabá

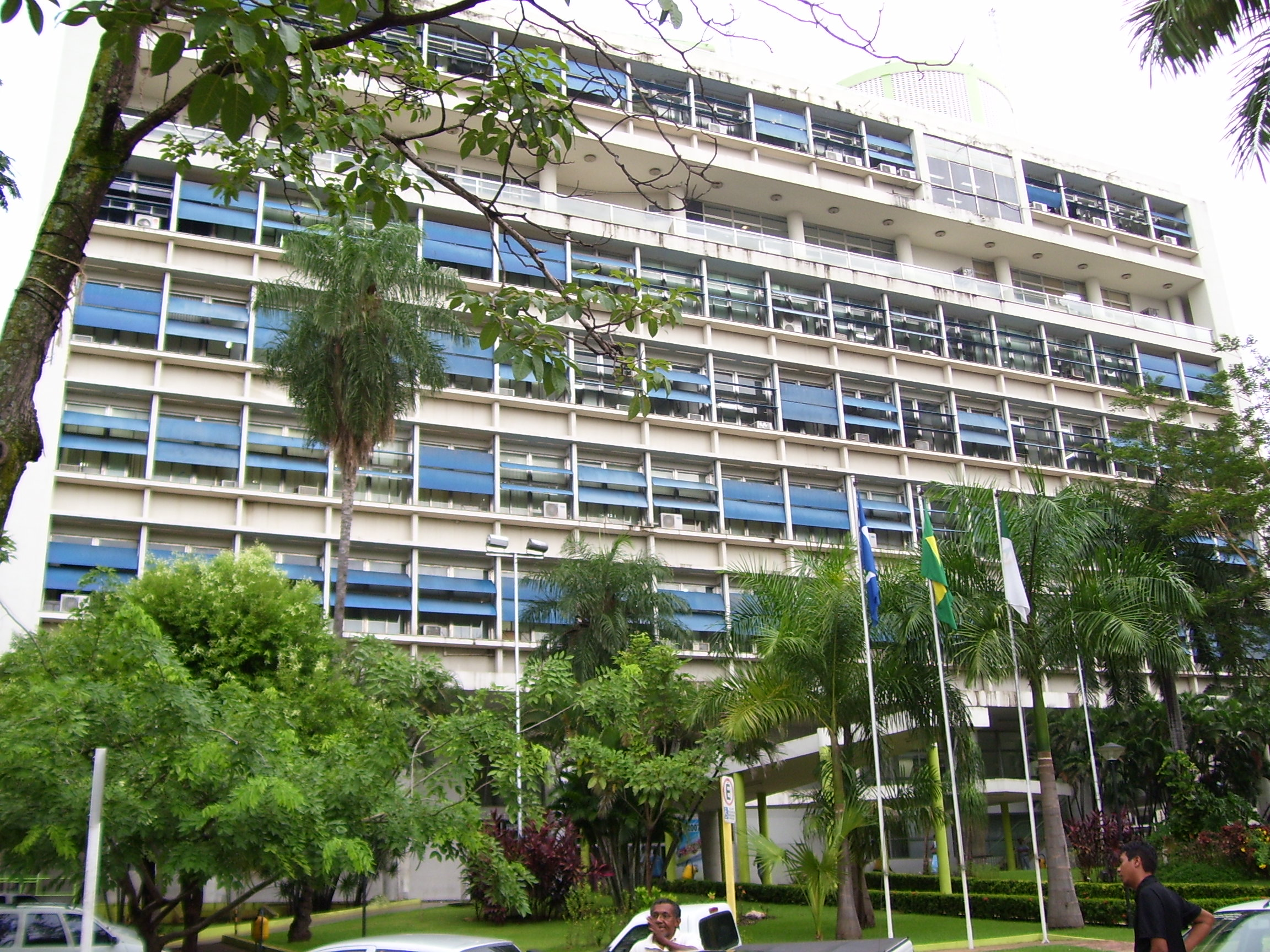
Cuiabá City Hall.

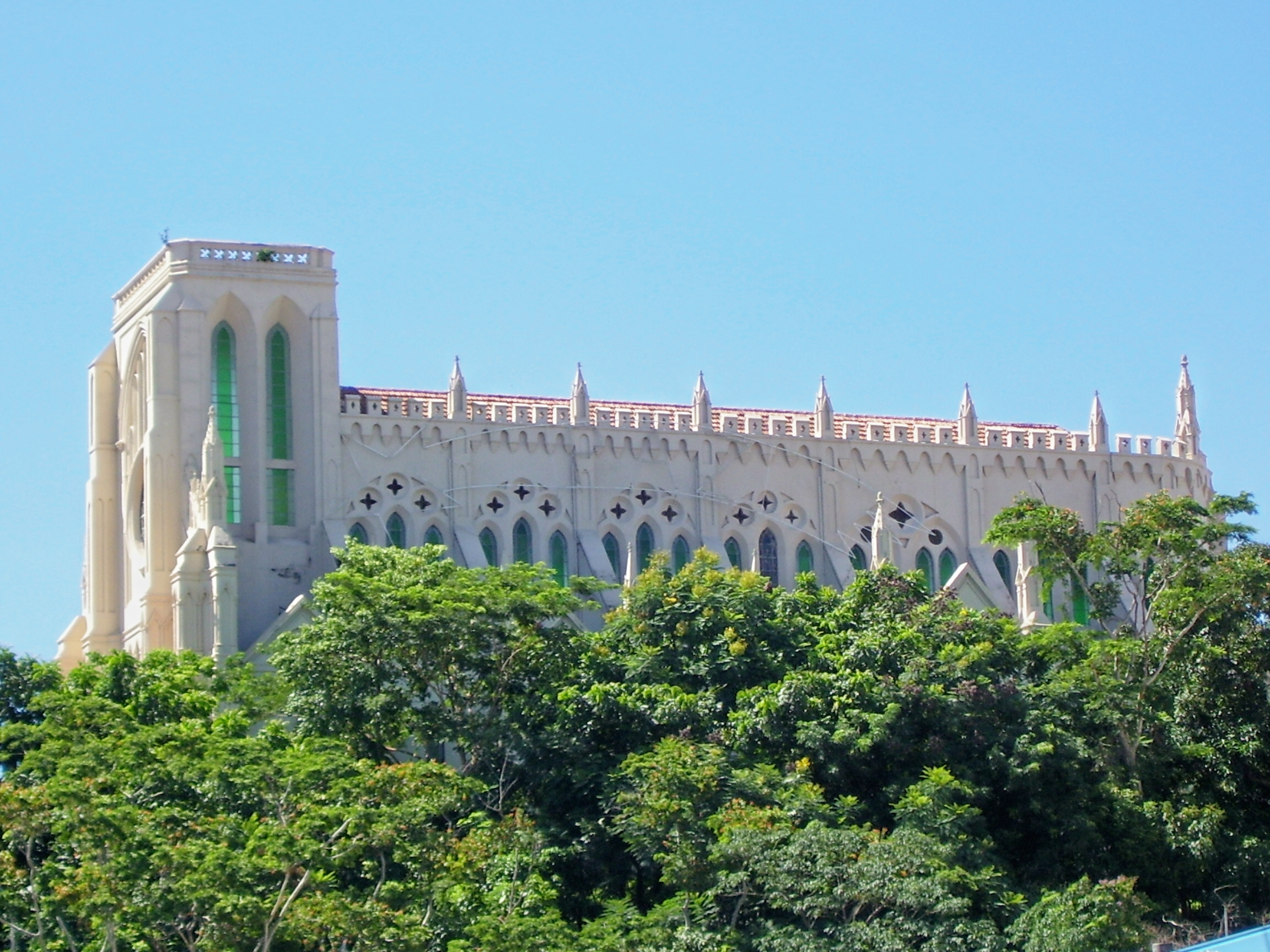
Church of Our Lady of Good Dispatch (Igreja da Nossa Senhora de Bom Despacho)

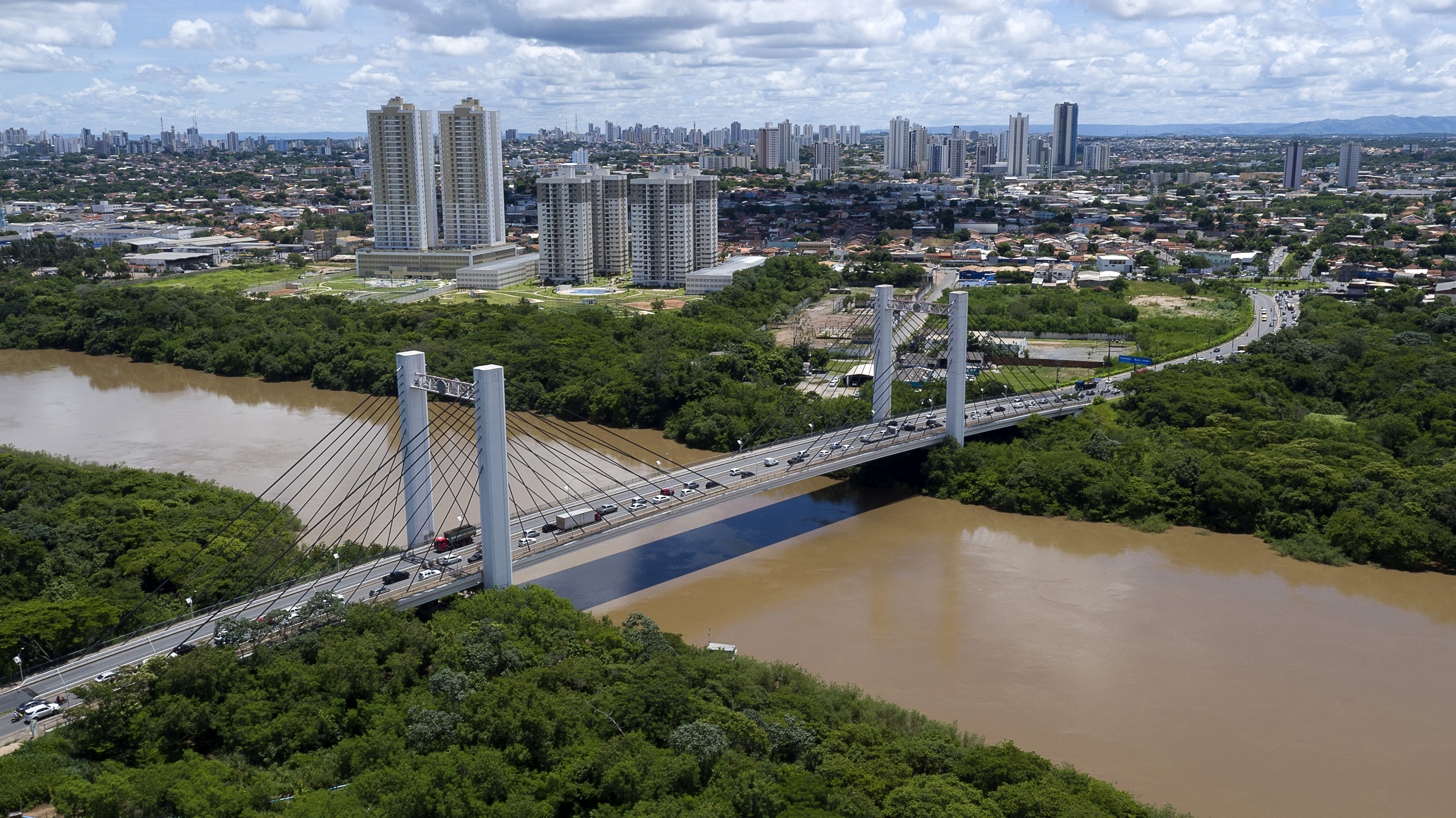
Sergio Motta Bridge with Cuiabá in the background

Cuiabá borders the towns of Chapada dos Guimarães, Campo Verde, Santo Antônio do Leverger, Várzea Grande, Jangada and Acorizal. The city is an intersection of many major roads and waterways. However, on account of sand banks along the river, these waterways no longer support medium or large ships.

The third most important airport of the Brazilian Mid-West region is located in Cuiabá, and the city is the centre of an important and productive agricultural region. It is famous throughout Brazil as one of the country's hottest cities, where temperatures are often above 40 °C (104 °F).

In central Cuiabá, an obelisk marks the exact center of the South American continent, as calculated in 1909. However, more accurate measurements in the 1990s located the exact center about 45 kilometres (28 mi) northeast of Cuiabá, near the town of Chapada dos Guimarães.

The town sits in a transition zone between three of the most characteristic Brazilian ecosystems: Amazon, Cerrado and Pantanal. It is also close to the mountain range known as Chapada dos Guimarães (which blocks polar masses and causes the extremely hot weather) and the city is also known as the Southern gate to the Amazon.

The municipality contains 11% of the 3,534-hectare (8,730-acre) Rio da Casca Ecological Station, a strictly protected conservation unit created in 1994.

=== Climate ===
Under the Köppen climate classification, Cuiabá has a tropical savanna climate (Köppen: Aw). Cuiabá is famous for its searing heat, although temperatures in winter can sometimes drop to 10 °C or 50 °F. This is atypical, caused by cold fronts coming in from the south, and may only last one or two consecutive days then returning to the usual heat. The climate is tropical and humid. Rainfall is concentrated from October to April, the mass of dry air over the center of Brazil inhibiting the rain formation from May to September. The cold fronts dissipates the heat associated with the smoke produced by fires during the dry season. The relative humidity drops to very low levels, sometimes below 15%, increasing cases of respiratory diseases. The average annual rainfall is 1,351.1 millimetres or 53.19 inches, with maximum intensity from December to March. The mean maximum temperature reaches 34 °C or 93.2 °F, but the absolute maximum can reach 40 °C or 104 °F in hotter months but is muffled on rainy days, when the maximum temperature is typically only 28 °C or 82.4 °F. The average low in July, the coldest month is 17.1 °C (62.8 °F) with wind chill of 10 °C (50 °F).

Climate data for Cuiaba (1991–2020)
Month	Jan	Feb	Mar	Apr	May	Jun	Jul	Aug	Sep	Oct	Nov	Dec	Year
Record high °C (°F)	38.2 (100.8)	37.4 (99.3)	37.6 (99.7)	38.1 (100.6)	36.4 (97.5)	37.2 (99.0)	38.4 (101.1)	42.2 (108.0)	44.0 (111.2)	44.2 (111.6)	41.1 (106.0)	42.4 (108.3)	44.2 (111.6)
Mean daily maximum °C (°F)	33.0 (91.4)	32.8 (91.0)	33.2 (91.8)	33.1 (91.6)	31.6 (88.9)	31.8 (89.2)	32.2 (90.0)	34.7 (94.5)	35.6 (96.1)	35.1 (95.2)	34.0 (93.2)	33.3 (91.9)	33.4 (92.1)
Daily mean °C (°F)	27.0 (80.6)	27.0 (80.6)	27.1 (80.8)	26.8 (80.2)	25.0 (77.0)	24.0 (75.2)	23.6 (74.5)	25.8 (78.4)	27.9 (82.2)	28.4 (83.1)	27.9 (82.2)	27.6 (81.7)	26.4 (79.5)
Mean daily minimum °C (°F)	23.7 (74.7)	23.6 (74.5)	23.5 (74.3)	22.8 (73.0)	20.2 (68.4)	18.4 (65.1)	17.1 (62.8)	18.7 (65.7)	21.9 (71.4)	23.6 (74.5)	23.8 (74.8)	23.8 (74.8)	21.8 (71.2)
Record low °C (°F)	20.5 (68.9)	19.2 (66.6)	15.4 (59.7)	13.8 (56.8)	9.1 (48.4)	7.4 (45.3)	4.8 (40.6)	7.6 (45.7)	10.5 (50.9)	13.3 (55.9)	14.7 (58.5)	16.2 (61.2)	4.8 (40.6)
Average precipitation mm (inches)	238.3 (9.38)	261.9 (10.31)	232.9 (9.17)	112.8 (4.44)	53.4 (2.10)	19.7 (0.78)	10.2 (0.40)	13.2 (0.52)	50.5 (1.99)	128.6 (5.06)	194.6 (7.66)	200.0 (7.87)	1,516.1 (59.69)
Average precipitation days (≥ 1.0 mm)	16.3	15.1	14.6	8.1	3.8	1.3	1.0	1.8	4.7	9.1	11.2	14.2	101.2
Average relative humidity (%)	80.8	82.1	82.7	79.2	76.9	73.6	67.6	60.4	61.4	68.7	74.6	77.4	73.7
Mean monthly sunshine hours	153.8	140.8	177.7	199.6	204.0	190.3	232.9	229.4	168.4	186.1	180.2	148.4	2,211.6
Percentage possible sunshine	38	40	47	57	58	57	66	64	47	48	47	37	50
Average ultraviolet index	12	12	12	11	9	7	8	9	12	12	12	12	11
Source 1:
Source 2:

=== Vegetation ===
The Massairo Okamura State Park provides a green space with typical cerrado vegetation in the centre of a highly urbanized area. It helps preserve the headwaters of the Barbado and Moinho streams. The 66 hectares (160 acres) Zé Bolo Flô State Park is in the Grande Coxipó district. The city also includes the 77 hectares (190 acres) Mãe Bonifácia State Park, created in 2000, also with typical cerrado trees. Cerrado includes various types of vegetation. It is characterized by extensive savanna formations crossed by gallery forests and stream valleys. Humid fields and "buriti" palm paths are found where the water table is near the surface. Alpine pastures occur at higher altitudes and mesophytic forests on more fertile soils.

"Cerrado" trees have characteristic twisted trunks covered by a thick bark, and leaves which are usually broad and rigid. Many herbaceous plants have extensive roots to store water and nutrients. The plant's thick bark and roots serve as adaptations for the periodic fires which sweep the cerrado landscape. These adaptations protect the plants from destruction and make them capable of sprouting again after the fire.

=== Distances ===
From São Paulo - 1,690 km (1,050 mi) From Rio de Janeiro - 2,090 km (1,300 mi) From Brasília - 1,130 km (700 mi)

== Economy ==
The economy of Cuiabá is concentrated on commerce, services and industry. Commerce and services based in Cuiabá are important to the whole state, since the population is divided in several small agriculture-centered cities. People from these smaller cities often travel to the capital to access these services and buy goods not sold anywhere else.

The industrial sector is represented, basically, by agribusiness, particularly food processing. Many industries, mainly those that should be maintained far from the populous areas, have been set up in the Industrial District of Cuiabá (DIICC), which was founded in 1978. Even though it is located in one of the most agriculturally focused states of Brazil, Cuiabá itself only grows small vegetable farms, mainly family- or cooperative-based.

The city, with a GDP of 4.75 billion reals in 2003, according to the IBGE, is responsible for 21.99% of the total of the state GDP. Greater Cuiabá possesses, currently, four shopping centers registered in the HUGS (Brazilian Association of Shopping Centers), and another 8 commercial galleries.

The GDP for the city was R$7,189,521,000 (2006).

The per capita income for the city was R$13,244 (2006).

== Education ==
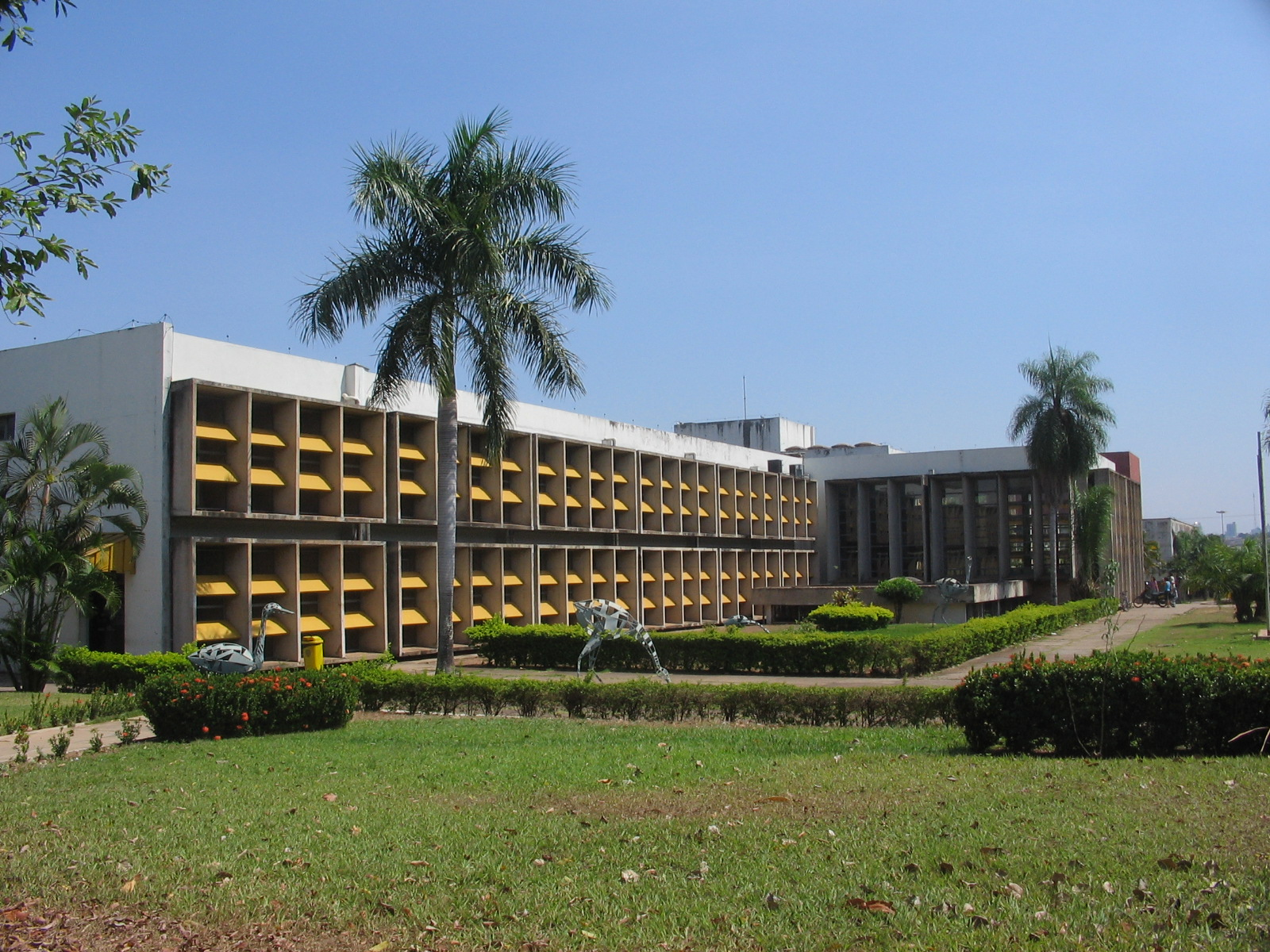
Federal University of Mato Grosso.

English is taught as part of the official high school curriculum.

Higher educational institutions include

- IFMT - Instituto Federal de Educação, Ciência e Tecnologia de Mato Grosso (Public)
- Universidade Federal de Mato Grosso (UFMT) (Public);
- Universidade de Cuiabá (Unic) (Private);
- and many others (mostly private).

== Culture ==
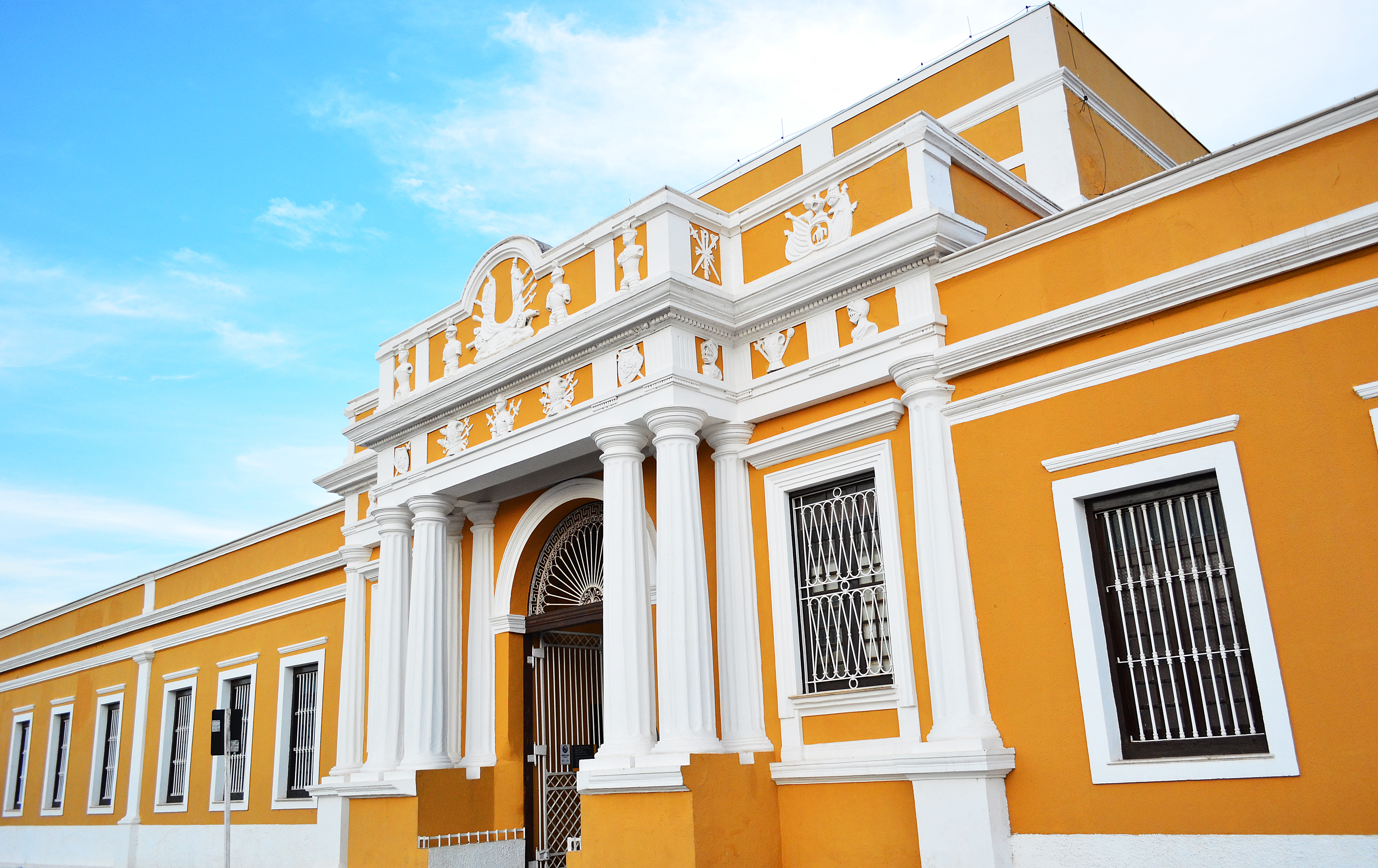
Cultural Centre of Sesc in Cuiabá.

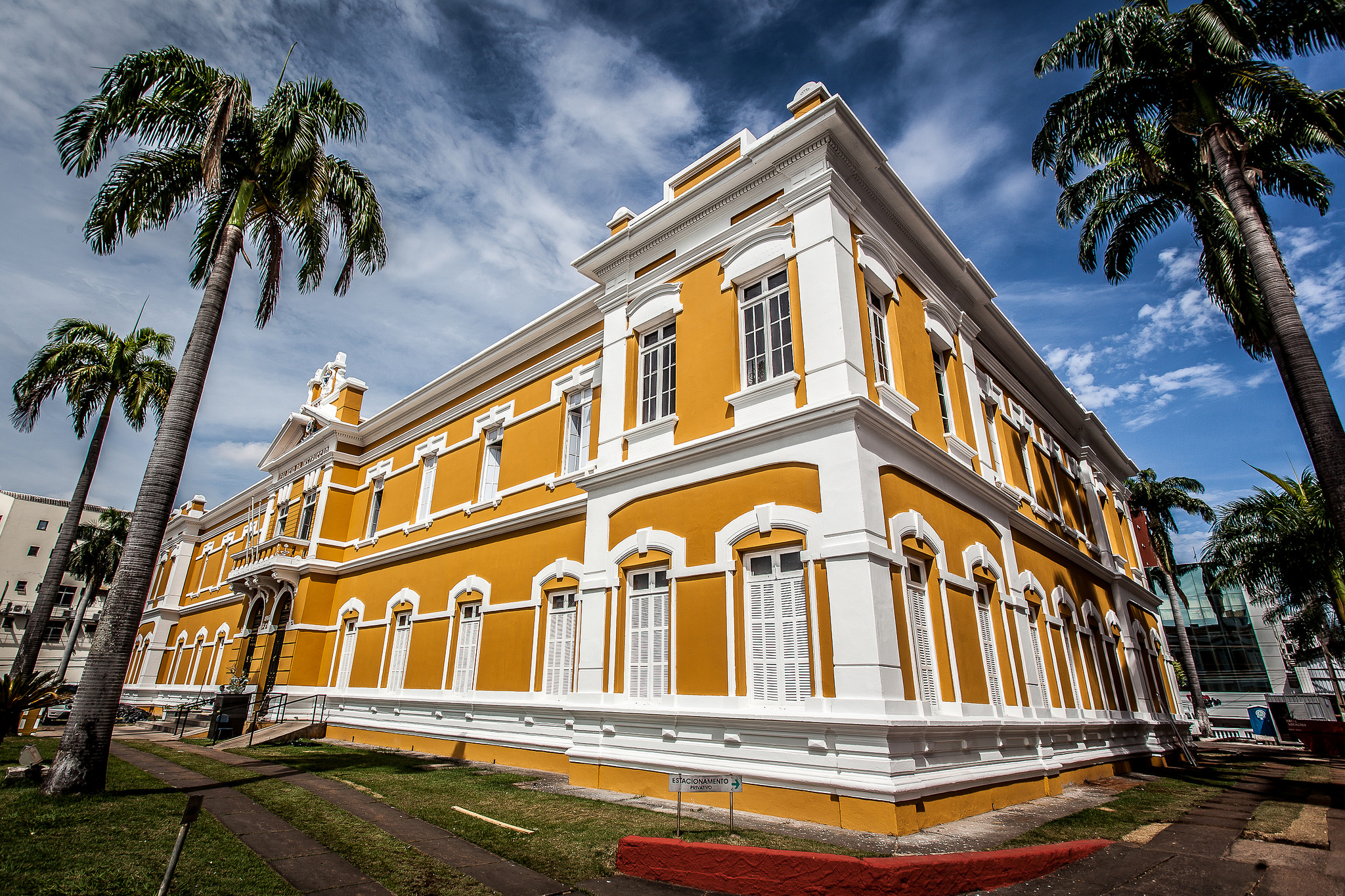
Historical Museum of Mato Grosso.

Cuiabá has a rich local culture based on Portuguese, African and Amerindian influences. It is home to an Indigenous Brazilian-influenced cuisine, dance traditions, craft-work and music. Local dance and music were traditionally connected to the worship of Catholic saints. Saint Benedict is the patron saint of Cuiabá.

=== Museums ===
- Museum Hill of the Old Cistern
- Memorial of Mato Grosso
- Museum of the Image and Sound of Cuiabá
- Artisan's home
- Museum of Rio Cuiabá and Municipal Aquarius
- Memorial of the Waters
- Museum of the Education and Teatro Maria of Arruda Müller
- Museum of Sacred Art of Cuiabá
- Museum Couto Magalhães
- Memorial to Pope John Paul II
- Historical and Geographical Institute of Mato Grosso and the Mato Grosso Academy of Letters, located at the House of the Baron of Melgaço
- Institute of the Historical and Environmental Patrimony National–Cuiabá
- Palace of the Instruction
- Museum of the History of Mato Grosso
- Museum of the Movies, located in the Cine Teatro of Cuiabá
- Arsenal de Guerra de Cuiabá, now SESC Arsenal and Museum of the Swampland.

=== Carnival ===
Carnaval in Brazil spans the four-day period before Lent leading up to Ash Wednesday. As with other capital cities in Brazil, there are parties across the city, known in Portuguese as the "bailes do Carnaval". Cuiabá, like other cities in Brazil, holds an off-season Carnaval, known as the "Carnaval fora de época" or "micareta"; it is locally called the "micarecuia".

=== Historic structures and protected area ===
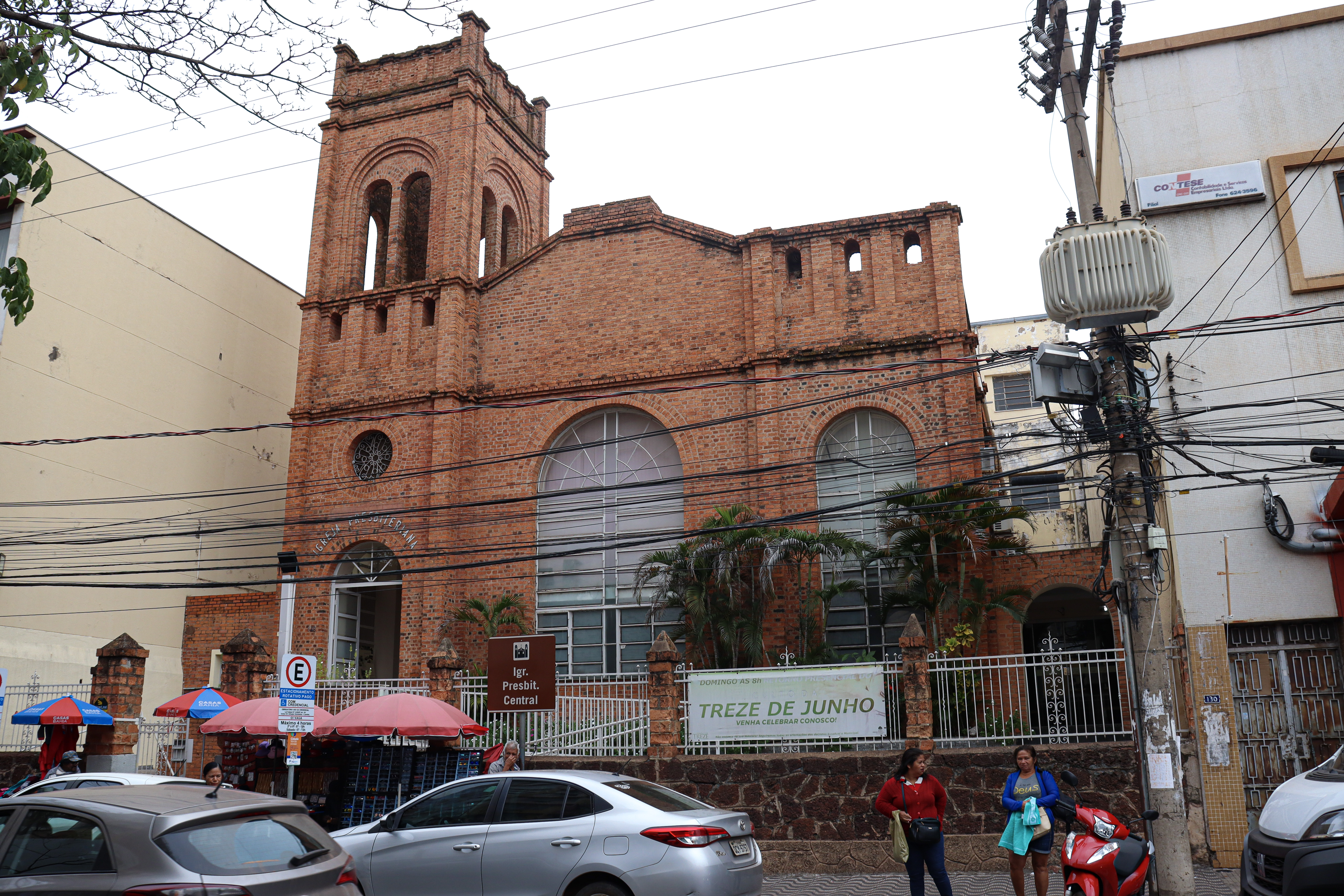
Presbyterian Church of Cuiabá.

Cuiabá is home to colonial and 18th century historic structures. Many are protected as Brazilian national, state, and municipal monuments. The Historic Center of Cuiabá was designated a national monument by the National Institute of Historic and Artistic Heritage (IPHAN) in 1993.

Individually protected structures include the:

- Church of Our Lady of the Rosary and Saint Benedict
- Presbyterian Church of Cuiabá
- Fountain of Mundéu

== Transportation ==
=== International airport ===
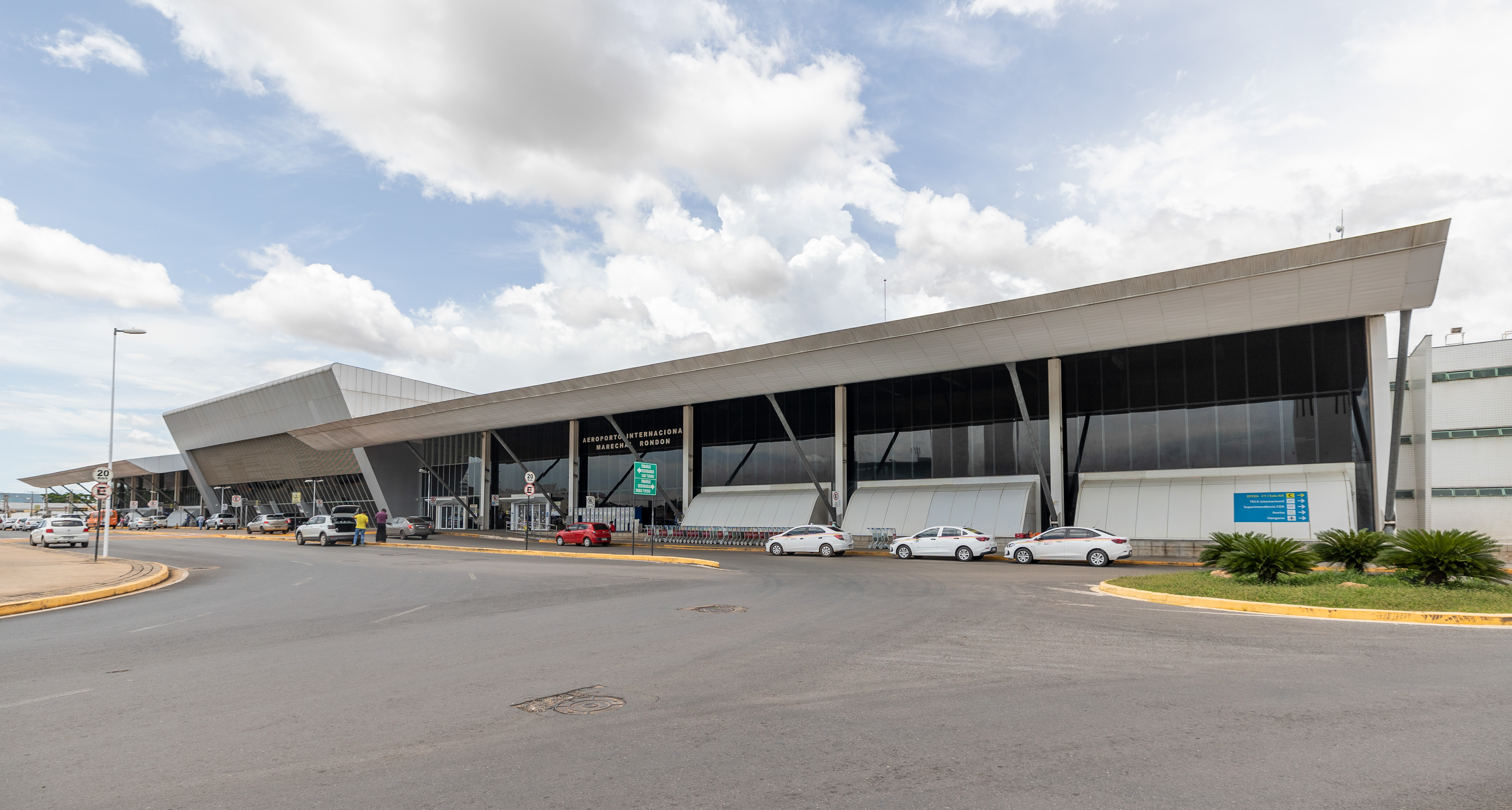
Marechal Rondon International Airport (CGB).

Marechal Rondon International Airport connects Cuiabá with many Brazilian cities and also operates some international flights. The runway at Marechal Rondon International Airport was opened to traffic in 1956. In February 1975, Infraero took over the airport's administration and began various upgrades to meet the needs of the airport complex.

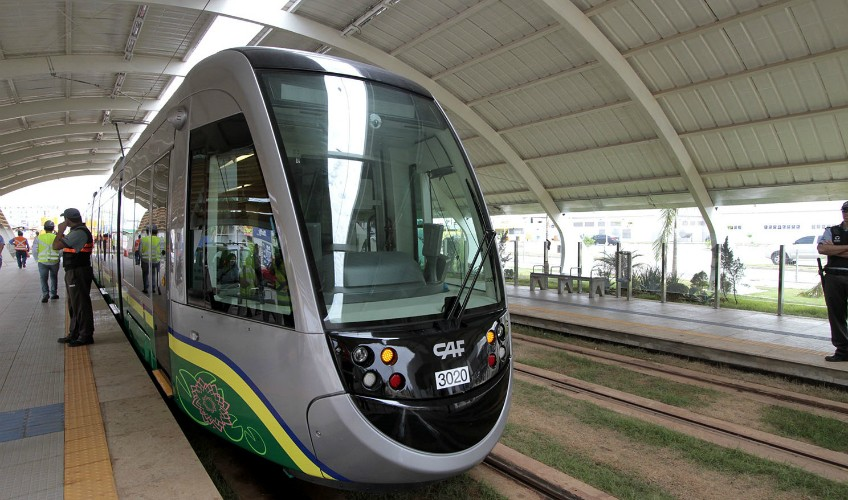
Cuiabá light rail.

In 1996, Marechal Rondon Airport, located 10 km (6.2 mi) from the city center, started receiving international flights. Currently it serves more than 900 thousand passengers a year.

The airport has one building. There are two sections, upstairs and downstairs. Downstairs is all check-in terminals, and upstairs there are shops, eateries and an observation lounge.

=== Highways ===
Cuiabá is connected to the Pacific Ocean with the Interoceanic Highway, and to the Atlantic Ocean by the BR-364 Highway.

=== Light rail ===
A 22-kilometer (14 mi) light rail line, that would connect Cuiabá with Várzea Grande in the Cuiabá metropolitan area and the international airport, was under construction and was originally intended to begin operations in time for the 2014 FIFA World Cup. Due to political corruption commonly, the project was started and abandoned, as construction stopped and construction of the infrastructure never started being built, except for a section of the line near the airport, but it was never used. No line has ever been operational.

=== Pipeline ===
Thermal electric and hydroelectric plants located in the greater Cuiabá metropolitan area expanded in 2000 after the completion of the Pantanal Pipeline. The natural gas pipeline runs between Mato Grosso and Bolivia.

== Sports ==
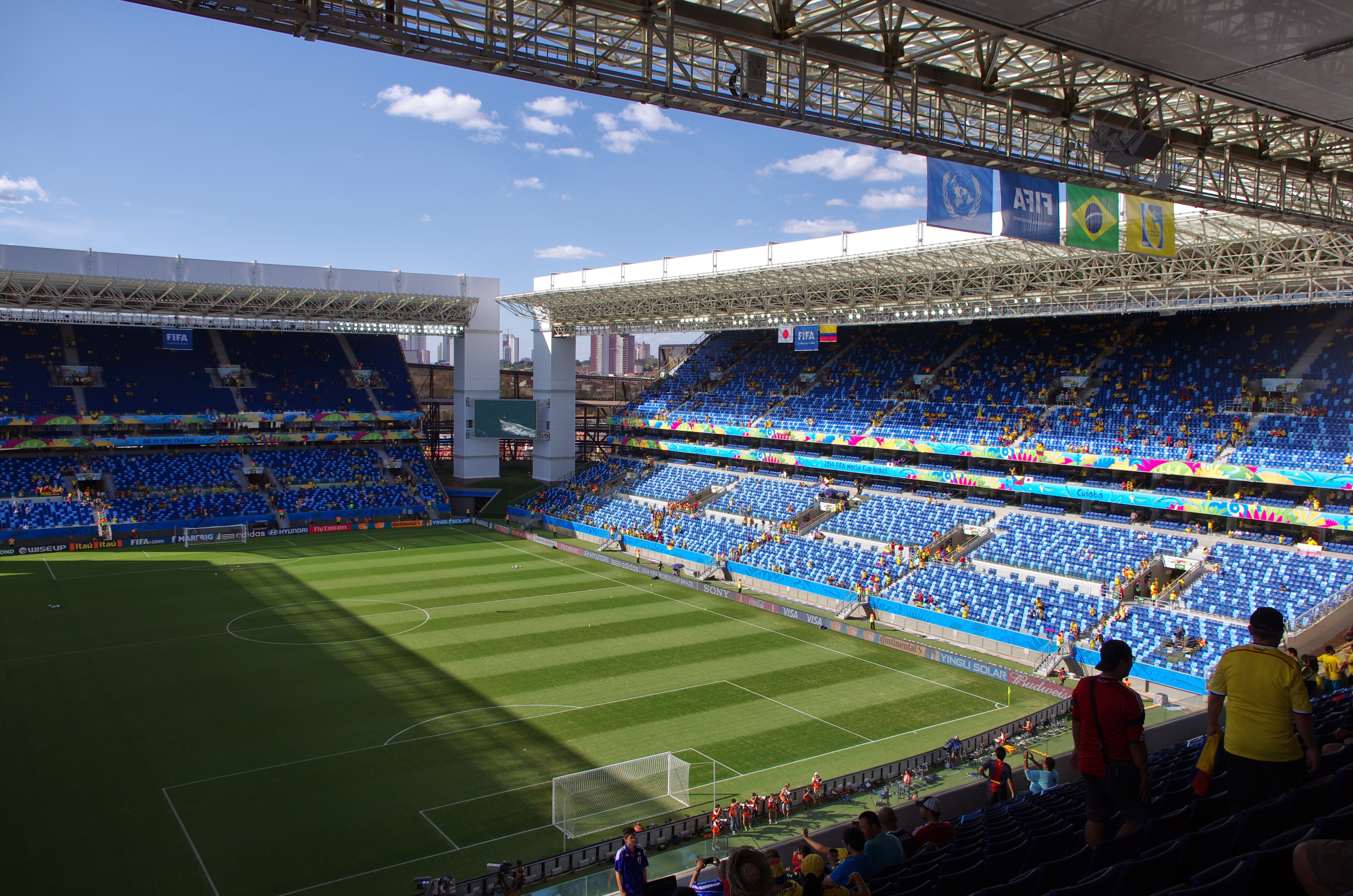
Arena Pantanal.

Cuiabá was one of 12 cities chosen to host games of the 2014 FIFA World Cup, which took place in Brazil. The games were to be played at the Arena Pantanal, a stadium completed in April 2014, with a capacity of 42,968. The stadium hosted four group matches in the tournament.

It replaced the old Estádio José Fragelli (Verdão), which used to be the principal football stadium of the city. Verdão got demolished in 2010, and works on the new stadium commenced later that year. The architects GCP Arquitetos have focused strongly on sustainability and one of the stadium's noticeable features are the plants and trees that fill the four corner areas. Following completion, the stadium has become the permanent home of local sides Mixto EC and Cuiabá EC. Next to the football stadium is the Tocantins Gymnasium - Ginásio Aecim Tocantins.

The stadium has a car park of 15,000 spaces. Local side Mixto hold the record for most state titles, having won the Campeonato Mato-Grossense on 24 occasions. Mixto are also the only club from Mato Grosso to have played at the top level of Brazilian football, the Brasileirão, in 1976 and 1986. Even more contested than Manaus as a FIFA World Cup host city, Cuiabá represents both the positive and negative of Brazil's hosting of the event. Negative because it is a relatively small, remote city with no great footballing tradition, best as its inclusion shows that the World Cup, geographically speaking at least, will be an event for all of Brazil and not just in the east coast capitals.

== Sister cities ==
- Kyzyl, Tuva, Russia

== Notable people ==
- Felipe Lima, swimmer, World Championship runner-up
- David Moura, judoka, World Championship runner-up
- Igor Queiroz, Greco-Roman wrestler
- Lenísio, futsal player, world champion
- Vinicius, futsal player, world champion
- Eurico Gaspar Dutra, former president of Brazil
