= Geodetic Center of South America =

Coordinates: 15°36′02.10″S 56°06′01.53″W

Cuiabá is home to the Geodetic Center of South America, at coordinates 15° 35′ 56.80″ south latitude and 56° 06′ 05.55″ west longitude. Located in the current Pascoal Moreira Cabral square, it was determined by Marshal Cândido Rondon in 1909. The correct point of the geodetic center has been contested, but calculations made by the Brazilian Army confirmed the coordinates of the marker calculated by Rondon. The square was known as Campo d'Ourique, a place where slaves were punished and where horse races and bullfights were held. From 1972 onwards, the Legislative Assembly of Mato Grosso State operated there; today the Cuiabá City Council functions at the location. In the 1970s, an obelisk was built at the exact location. The old marker is visible inside the new structure. This current obelisk is represented on the flag of Cuiabá and on the emblem of the football team Cuiabá Esporte Clube.
