= Serra Ricardo Franco State Park =

State park in Mato Grosso, Brazil

- Parque Estadual Serra de Ricardo Franco
- IUCN category II (national park)
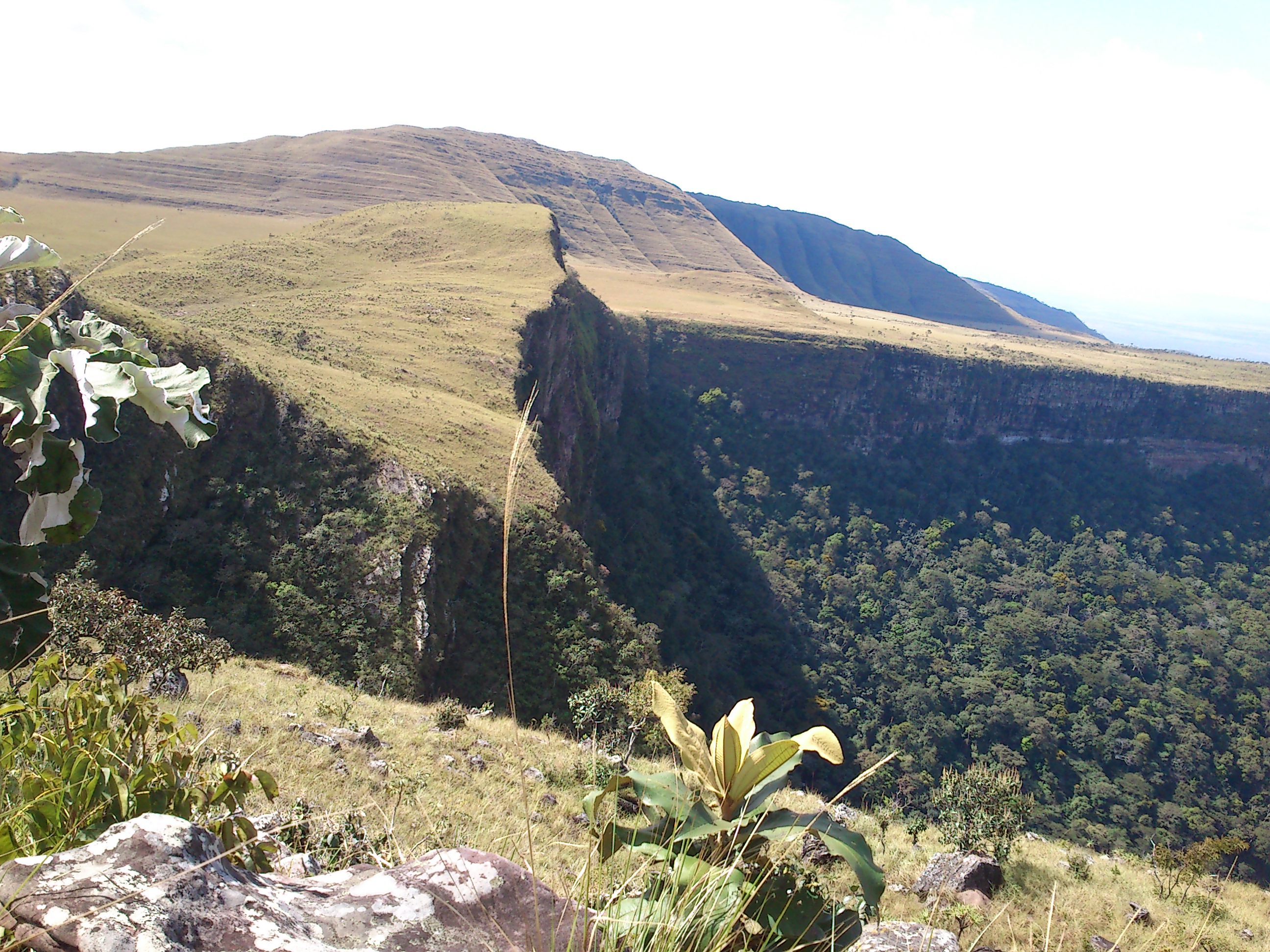
- Landscape in the park

- Location within Brazil
- Nearest city: Vila Bela da Santíssima Trindade, Mato Grosso
- Coordinates: 14.6046°S 60.2928°W
- Area: 158,621 hectares (391,960 acres)
- Designation: State park
- Created: 4 November 1997
- Administrator: Fundação Estadual do Meio Ambiente de Mato Grosso

The Serra Ricardo Franco State Park (Portuguese: Parque Estadual Serra de Ricardo Franco) is a state park in the state of Mato Grosso, Brazil. It protects the edge of a plateau on the border with Bolivia in the region of transition from cerrado to Amazon rainforest. The park has been poorly protected and is badly degraded in areas by deforestation and conversion to pasturage. It is threatened by illegal squatters, hunting and burning.

== Location ==
The Serra Ricardo Franco State Park is the municipality of Vila Bela da Santíssima Trindade, Mato Grosso. It has an area of 158,621 hectares (391,960 acres). It borders the Noel Kempff Mercado National Park in Bolivia, to the west. The Serra de Ricardo Franco is a plateau connected to the Serra de Santa Bárbara and Serra de São Vicente, which form the most visible relief feature of the Brazilian midwest. The park contains several left bank tributaries of the upper Guaporé River. The park holds the Jatobá waterfall, the highest in the state with a vertical drop of 248 metres (814 ft).

== History ==
The Serra Ricardo Franco State Park was created by decree 1.796 of 4 November 1997, covering lands in the municipality of Vila Bela da Santíssima Trindade with an area of 158,620.85 hectares (391,960.7 acres). The objective was to protect water resources and the viability of movement of native fauna, preserve samples of existing ecosystems and allow controlled use by the public. There were already squatters in the park when it was created. An effort was made to reduce the size of the park in 2003 to exclude land used for productive activities. That year the state government allowed the deadline for expropriations to expire.

In November 2004 the State Environment Foundation (FEMA) presented a proposal approved by the state governor Blairo Maggi to reduce the size of the park by 100,000 hectares (250,000 acres). The reason was that the government no longer had money for expropriations. The areas would be those that had been occupied before the park was created, reaching to the foot of the mountains. In compensation, FEMA proposed to define an environmental protection area of 70,000 hectares (170,000 acres) in part of the area removed from the park. The mayor of the municipality said the proposal was very interesting. He was in favor of the park as long as it was not in the productive areas. He was not concerned about loss of ecological funding, which was small in comparison to the revenue from the new areas that could be planted with soybeans.

On 17 October 2014 landowners and squatters were called upon to submit documents relevant to properties in the park pending land ownership regularization. The consultative council was created by ordinance 585 of 5 December 2014. On 10 December 2015 land in the park was donated to the State of Mato Grosso in compensation for the environmental impact of the 230 kv Jauru-Porto Velho transmission line. SEMA identified 35 legally owned properties in the park by March 2016. The owners could sell the land directly to the state, or to other landowners in Mato Grosso who needed legal conservation areas to compensate for degraded areas.

A management plan is required before the park can be officially open to the public, and in March 2016 SEMA had plans to hire a company to prepare the plan. As of 2016 the park was supported by the Amazon Region Protected Areas Program.

== Environment ==
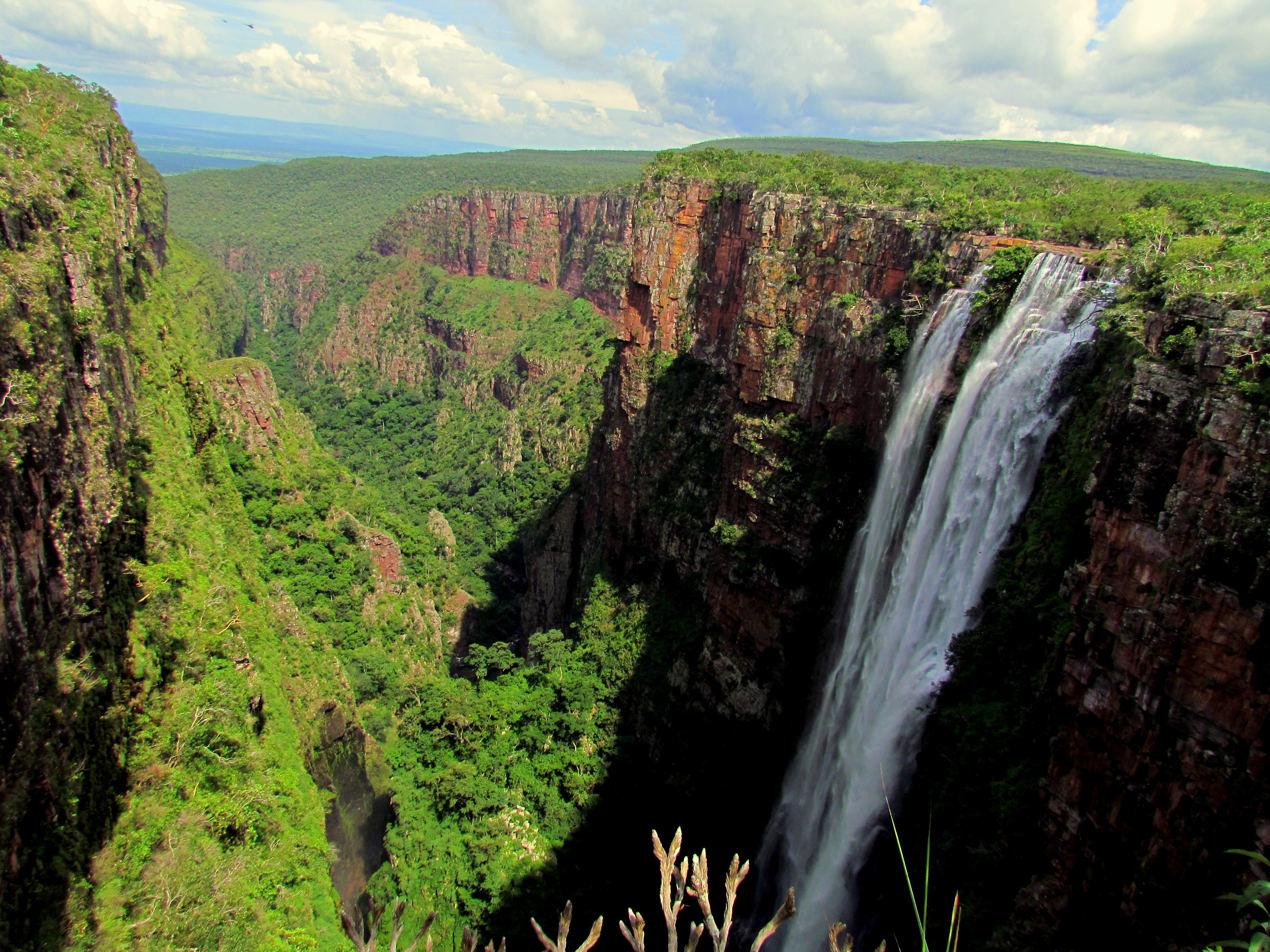
Jatobá waterfall

The park is in the Guaporé Depression. It is in the ecotone region between the Brazilian cerrado and the Amazon rainforest, with unique landscapes. Although some areas have been degraded by human activities, there are still extensive areas of seasonal semi-deciduous forest, with many Amazonian species. There are large areas of rocky fields at the margin of the park that have not been studied in any detail.

The park is home to flora and fauna typical of both biomes, including endemic and endangered animals such as the giant anteater (Myrmecophaga tridactyla), neotropical otter (Lontra longicaudis) and giant otter (Pteronura brasiliensis). The otters are found in small groups or isolated pairs along the Guaporé River. Other mammals include monkeys, jaguars and tapirs. There are at least 174 species of fish. There are also large numbers of amphibians, reptiles, mammals and birds.

== Human activities ==
The main conflicting uses are deforestation, burning, predatory hunting and invasion by squatters. A large part of the park has been heavily degraded by logging, mining, deforestation and burning to create pasturage. In November 2015 staff from SEMA and the military police were searching the park for about 40 illegal gold miners who had moved there after being expelled from the Serra da Borda. However, the park has significant ecotourism potential with walks, trails and environmental education. This would stimulate the local economy with demand for accommodations, restaurants, guides and so on. As of 2016 only the Namorados waterfall circuit of trails was open, an area widely used by local residents.

== Sources ==
- Domingues, Rose (18 March 2016), Parque Serra de Ricardo Franco tem o maior potencial turístico do Estado (in Portuguese), SEMA-MT
- "Expulsos de área ilegal, garimpeiros são procurados em reserva vizinha", G1 Globo (in Portuguese), 13 November 2015
- Full list: PAs supported by ARPA, ARPA
- Governo do Mato Grosso quer tirar cem mil hectares do Parque Serra de Ricardo Franco (in Portuguese), Ambientebrasil, 12 November 2004
- Parque Estadual da Serra de Ricardo Franco (in Portuguese), Via Rural, archived from the original on December 20, 2016
- PES Serra Ricardo Franco (in Portuguese), ISA: Instituto Socioambiental

== See also ==
- Wild Amazon faces destruction as Brazil’s farmers and loggers target national park, Jonathan Watts, Guardian, Sunday 28 May 2017
