= Federal Institute of Mato Grosso =

Federal educational institution in Brazil

Instituto Federal de Educação, Ciência e Tecnologia de Mato Grosso
- Type: Public university
- Established: December 29, 2008
- Rector: José Bispo Barbosa
- Location: Cuiabá, and other 15 cities, Mato Grosso, Brazil
- Campus: Urban
- Website: www.ifmt.edu.br

The Instituto Federal de Educação, Ciência e Tecnologia de Mato Grosso (IFMT) (Mato Grosso Federal Institute of Education, Science and Technology), also known as the late Centro Federal de Educação Tecnológica de Mato Grosso, is an institution that offers high and professional educations by having a pluricurricular form. It is an multicampi institution, especialized in offering professional and technological education.

IFMT has the objective of forming ethical citizens and professionals and of being an institution involved with the society. Its actions point toward the development of new technologies, cultural and social investments and the formation of critical citizens. The students abilities are improved and testes through the courses, helping them to develop the "know-how", and values concerning to all the areas.

== Campuses ==
- Campus Cuiabá - Octahyde Jorge da Silva
- Campus Cuiabá - Bela Vista
- Campus São Vicente
- Campus Cáceres
- Campus Barra do Garças
- Campus Campo Novo do Parecis
- Campus Confresa
- Campus Juína
- Campus Pontes e Lacerda
- Campus Rondonópolis
- Campus Sorriso
- Campus Sinop
- Campus Diamantino
- Campus Lucas do Rio Verde
- Campus Várzea Grande
- Campus Alta Floresta
- Campus Primavera do Leste

== See also ==
- Federal University of Mato Grosso
