= António Rolim de Moura Tavares, 1st Count of Azambuja =

Portuguese colonial administrator, Brazil (1709-1782)

His Lordship The Count of Azambuja
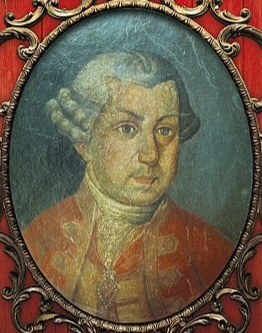
- Portrait by unknown author, 18th century

Viceroy of Brazil
- In office 17 November 1767 – 4 November 1769
- Monarch: Joseph I
- Preceded by: António Álvares da Cunha
- Succeeded by: Luís de Almeida Portugal

Personal details
- Born: March 12, 1709 Moura, Portugal
- Died: December 8, 1782 (aged 73) Lisbon, Portugal
- Occupation: Colonial administrator
- Notable work: Relação da viagem, que fêz o Conde de Azambuja, D. António Rolim, da cidade de S. Paulo para a vila de Cuiabá em 1751

D. António Rolim de Moura Tavares, 1st Count of Azambuja (12 March 1709 – 8 December 1782) was a Portuguese colonial administrator and the 10th Viceroy of Brazil. Tavares was born into the Portuguese nobility, and serve in the Portuguese military from 1726. He serviced as a colonial administrator in Brazil, and served as the first governor of Mato Grosso (1751–1765), Bahia (1766–1767), and Viceroy of Brazil and Governor of Rio de Janeiro (1767–1769). Tavares returned to Portugal in 1769 and served various government roles until his death in 1782. He is noted for his service as the First Viceroy of Brazil and travelogue, Relação da viagem, que fêz o Conde de Azambuja, D. António Rolim, da cidade de S. Paulo para a vila de Cuiabá em 1751. The manuscript has been published numerous times in Brazil.

== Early life and career ==
Tavares was born into the Portuguese aristocracy in Moura, Portugal in 1709. He was the son of Dom Nuno Manuel de Mendoça, 4th Count of Vale de Reis, member of the Regency Council of the Kingdom of Portugal. He mother was Dona Leonor de Noronha, daughter of the Dom Pedro de Noronha, the 1st Marquis of Angeja. Tavares began a military career in 1726. He became captain of the Infantry Regiment of the Court Garrison in 1735 and appointed overseer of the House of Queen Maria Ana in 1744. He also served as treasurer of the Hospital Real de Todos-os-Santos in 1748. Tavares was also a scholar, and probably studied at the Portuguese Royal Academy, with an interest in the arts, science, mathematics, and theology.

== Administration in Brazil ==
Tavares was appointed governor of newly created Captaincy of Mato Grosso in Brazil by King John V (1689-1750). He left Portugal for the post in 1749, and arrived in Cuiabá after a turbulent journey on January 12, 1751. Tavares assumed the position of governor and secured Portuguese possessions and expansion against the Spanish on the western border of the captaincy. He expelled Spanish missionaries; made alliances with the indigenous people; opened roads to Maranhão (then the State of Grão-Pará and Maranhão) and Bahia; and initiated sugar cultivation for commercial and industrial purposes. Tavares additionally founded a new capital for the captaincy, Vila Bela da Santíssima Trindade. Tavares corresponded frequently with Francisco Xavier de Mendonça Furtado (1701–1769); brother of Sebastião José de Carvalho e Melo, the powerful Marquis of Pombal; and founder of the State of Grão-Pará and Maranhão. He was named Count of Azambuja, a title created by Dom Joseph I of Portugal, by decree on May 21, 1763.

He was transferred to the government of Bahia in 1765, and served as Governor of Bahia from 1766 to 1767. Tavares was named viceroy of Brazil in 1767. He reorganized military forces in Rio de Janeiro for defense of the city against Spanish attack, with a primary focus on costal fortifications. He resigned from the position two years later.

== Return to Portugal and death ==
Tavares returned to Portugal in 1769. He was appointed president of the Finance Council in 1770, governor of the Arms of Lisbon and the province of Estremadura in 1789, and Governor of the Queen. Tavares was a member of the Royal Academy of Sciences. He died in Lisbon, Portugal, on December 8, 1782.

== Work ==
- Relação da viagem, que fêz o Conde de Azambuja, D. Antonio Rolim, da cidade de S. Paulo para a vila de Cuiabá em 1751, which described the geography and settlements of Brazil during his trip from São Paulo to Cuiabá, April 1750 to January 1751. The manuscript has been published in numerous editions in Brazil.
