= Church of Our Lady of the Rosary and Saint Benedict (Cuiabá) =

Church building in Cuiabá, Brazil

Coordinates: 15.5951°S 56.0918°W

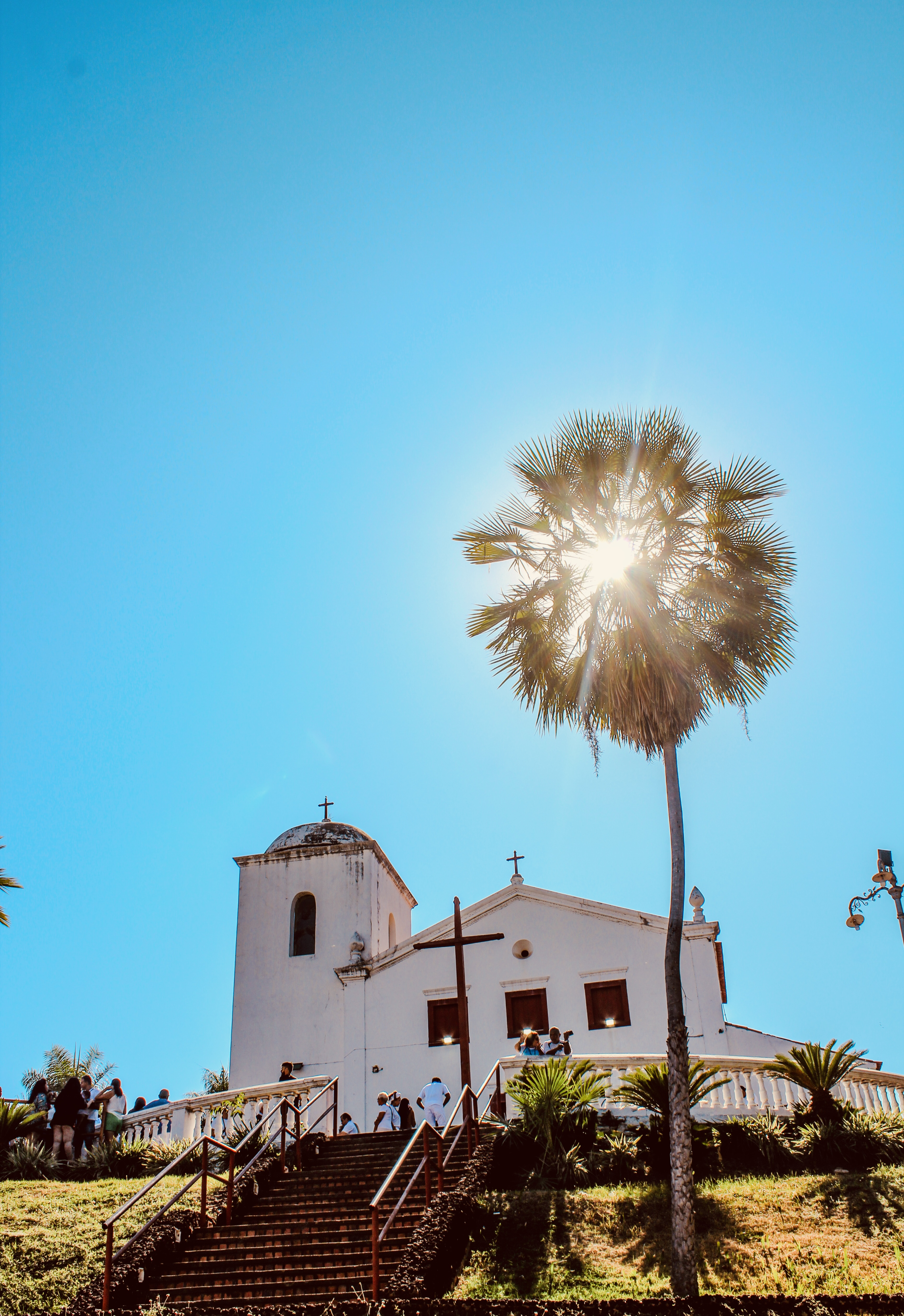

The Church of Our Lady of the Rosary and Saint Benedict (Portuguese: Igreja de Nossa Senhora do Rosário e São Benedito) is a Catholic church located in Cuiabá, the capital of the Brazilian state of Mato Grosso.

== See also ==
- Catholic Church in Brazil
