= Vila Bela da Santíssima Trindade =

- Municipality
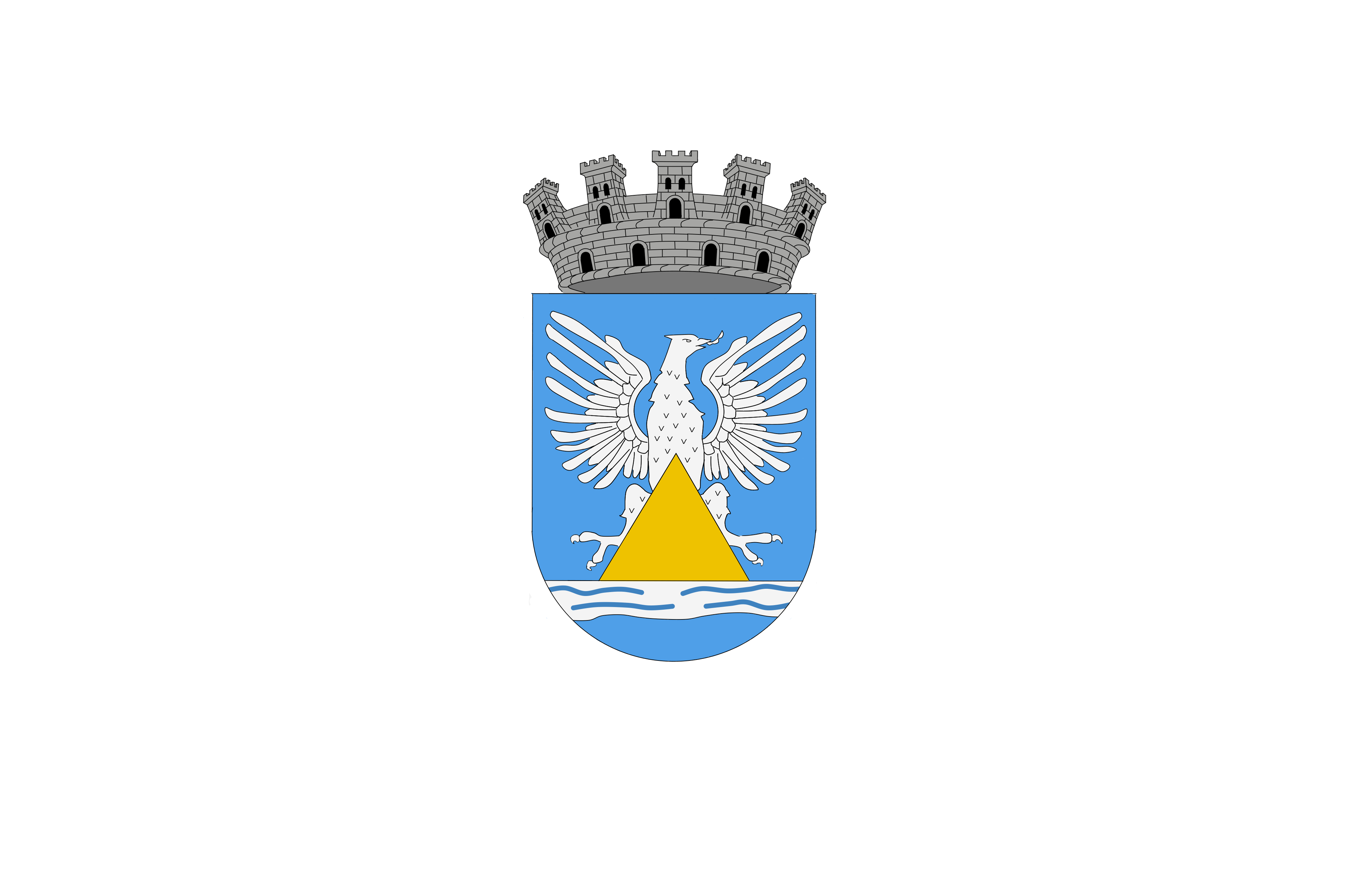
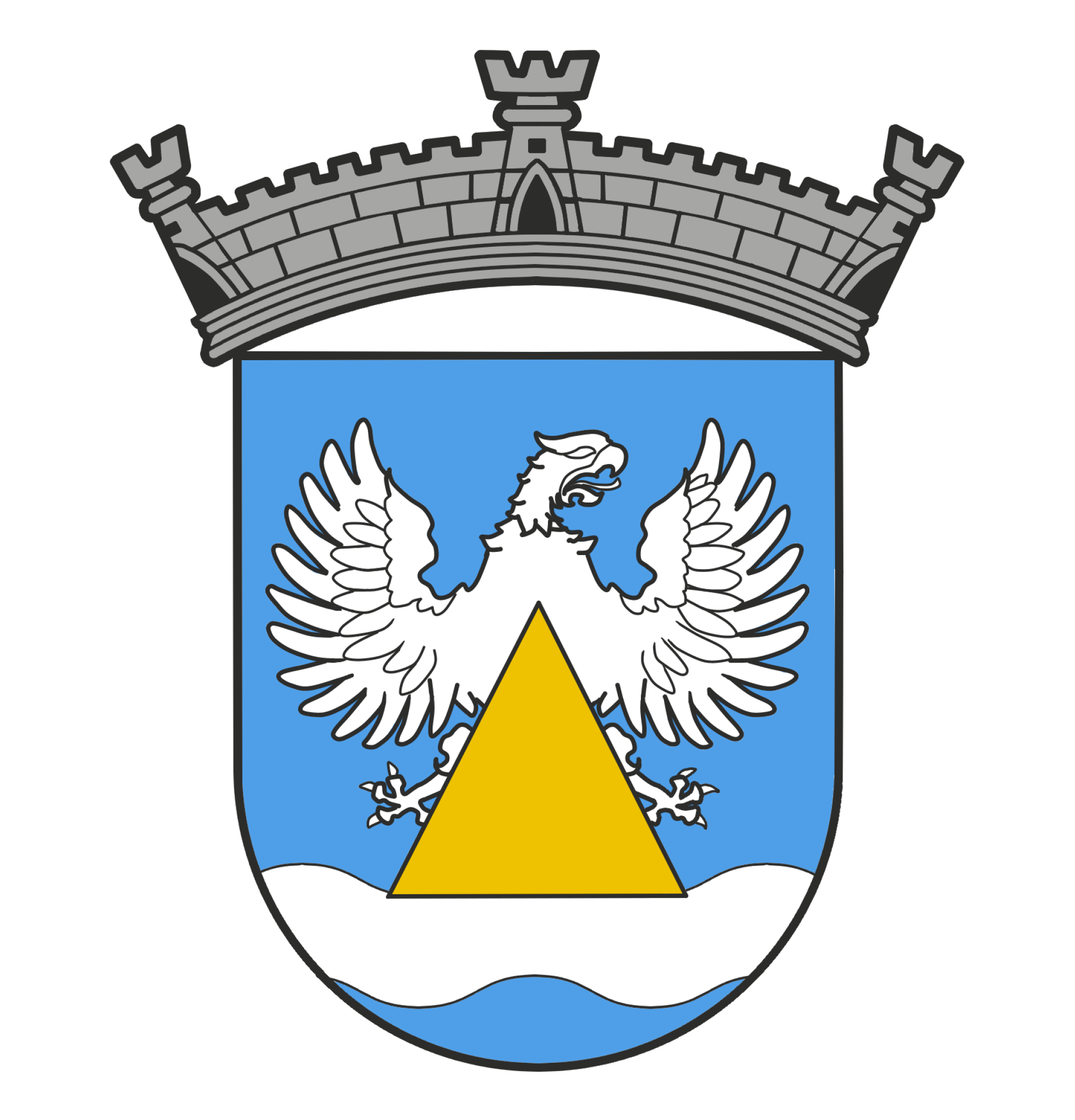
- Flag Coat of arms

- Location in Mato Grosso state

- Location in Brazil
- Coordinates: 15°0′28″S 59°57′3″W
- Country: Brazil
- Region: Central-West
- State: Mato Grosso

Population (2020)
  - Total: 16,271
- Time zone: UTC−3 (AMT)

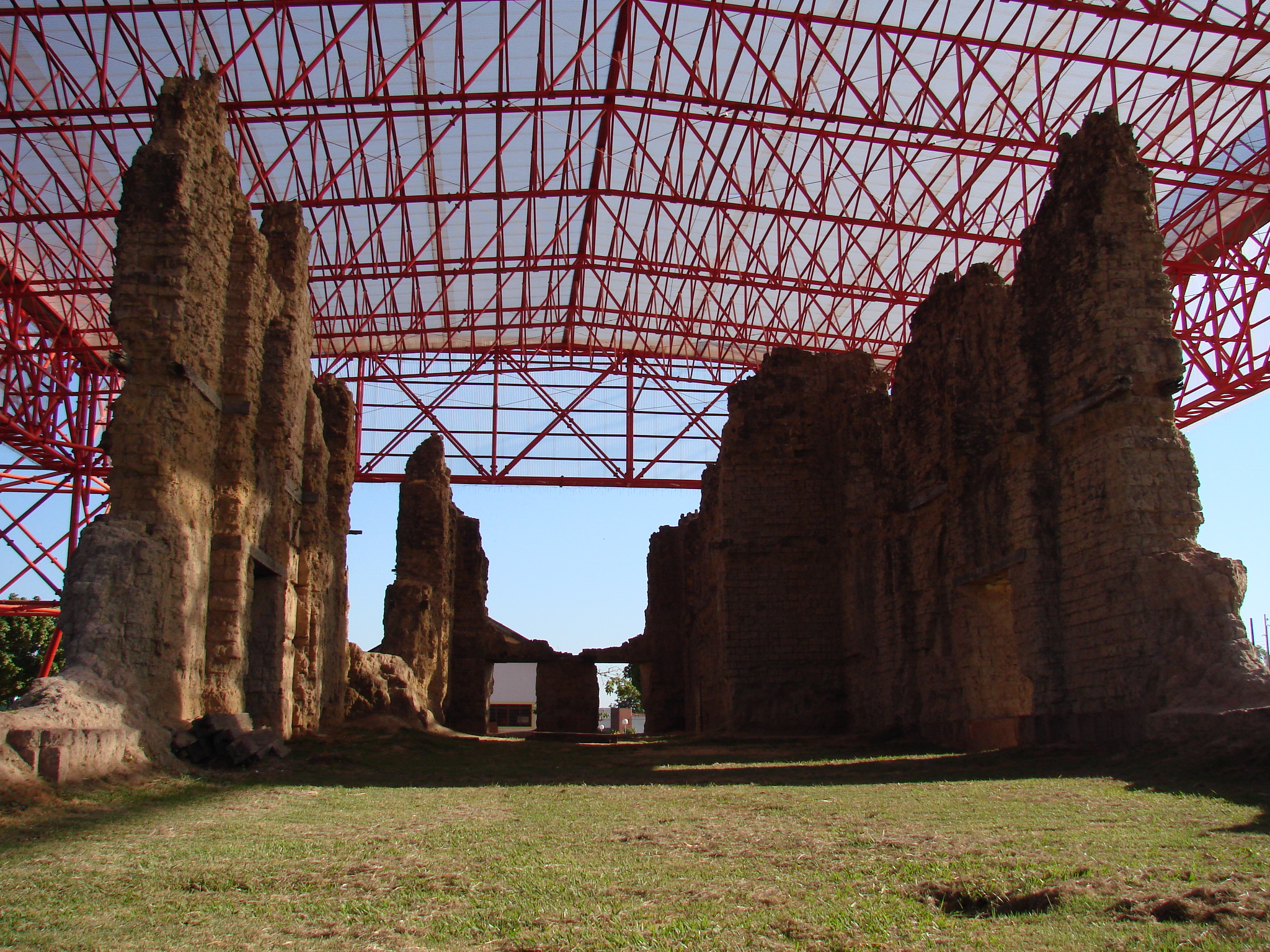
ruins of the Igreja Matriz in Vila Bela

Vila Bela da Santíssima Trindade is a Brazilian municipality in Mato Grosso with 16,271 (2020) inhabitants. It is located at upper Guaporé River close to the border with Bolivia. The municipality was founded by Dom Antônio Rolim de Moura Tavares (1709-1782), the first governor of the Captaincy of Mato Grosso, to serve as the capital of the new captaincy.

Today, because most inhabitants descend from former African slaves, the town creates the impression of a town in the African jungle rather than in one in the Amazon jungle. The distinct African feeling is also reflected in a yearly festival called Festa do Congo. One of its main events is the Dança do Congo, which is performed at the ruins of the former igreja matriz — a particular type of colonial Portuguese church. Aside from those church ruins, which are the main tourist site of the town, there is a small history museum.

The town serves as a hub for trips to the Amazon jungle along the upper Guaporé River and the nearby nature reserve Parque Estadual da Serra de Ricardo Franco. One of the main attractions of the latter is the Cascata dos Namorados (English: Valentine Cascades).

The municipality contains the 158,621-hectare (391,960-acre) Serra Ricardo Franco State Park, created in 1997.
