= Walhain =

Municipality in Walloon Brabant province, Wallonia, Belgium

- Municipality
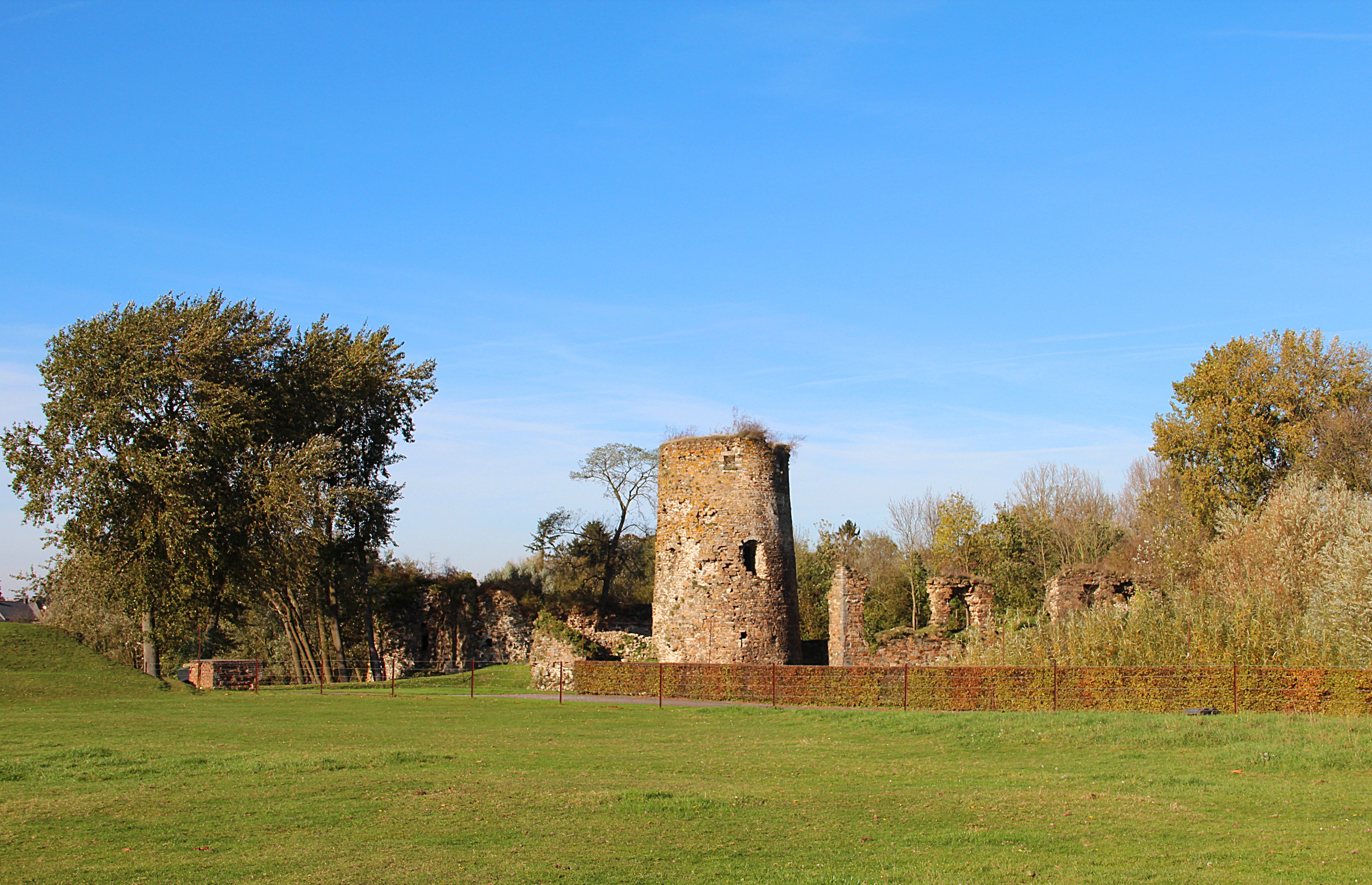
- Ruins of Walhain castle (12th century)

- Flag Coat of arms

- The municipality in the province of Walloon Brabant
- Interactive map of Walhain
- Location in Belgium
- Coordinates: 50°38′N 04°42′E
- Country: Belgium
- Community: French Community
- Region: Wallonia
- Province: Walloon Brabant
- Arrondissement: Nivelles

Government
  - Mayor: Xavier Dubois (cdH) (Avenir Communal)
  - Governing party: Avenir Communal - Ecolo

Area
  - Total: 38.08 km^{2} (14.70 sq mi)

Population (2018-01-01)
  - Total: 7,167
  - Density: 188.2/km^{2} (487.5/sq mi)
- Postal codes: 1457
- NIS code: 25124
- Area codes: 010
- Website: www.walhain.be

Walhain (French pronunciation: [walɛ̃]; Walloon: Walin) is a municipality in Wallonia, located in the province of Walloon Brabant, Belgium. It consists of the former municipalities of Nil-Saint-Vincent-Saint-Martin, Tourinnes-Saint-Lambert and Walhain-Saint-Paul.

The Belgian National Geographic Institute, the Belgian national cartographical service, calculated that the geographical centre of Belgium lay in this municipality, in Nil-Saint-Vincent at 50°38′28″N 4°40′05″E.

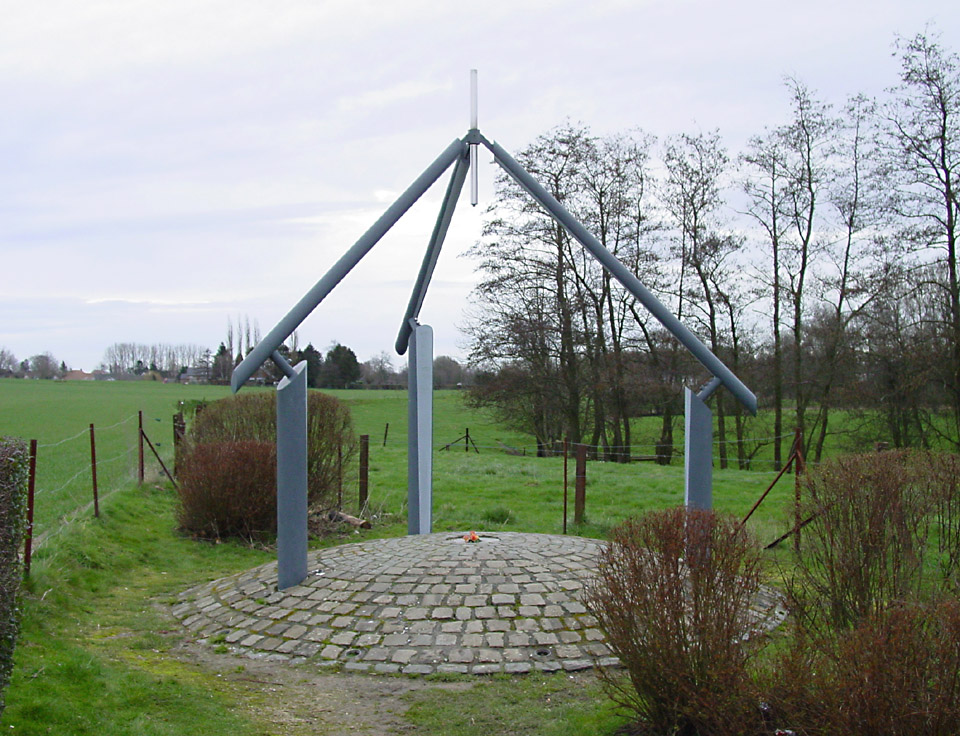
Centre of Belgium

== Villages of the municipality ==
Walhain-Saint-Paul, Walhain, Sart-lez-Walhain, Nil-Saint-Vincent, Nil-Saint-Martin, Nil-Pierreux, Lerinnes, Tourinnes-Saint-Lambert, Tourinnes les Ourdons et Perbais

== Sports ==
Walhain has two successful national division sport teams:

Firstly, they have a semi-professional football club, RFC Wallonia Walhain CG playing in the Promotion D, which is the 4th tier of Belgian football league. They could not avoid relegation in 2007, after more than 10 years in the third division.

They also have a good volleyball club, with both women's and men's teams playing in the second national division (the first division in Belgium being professional).
