= Geography of the Soviet Union =

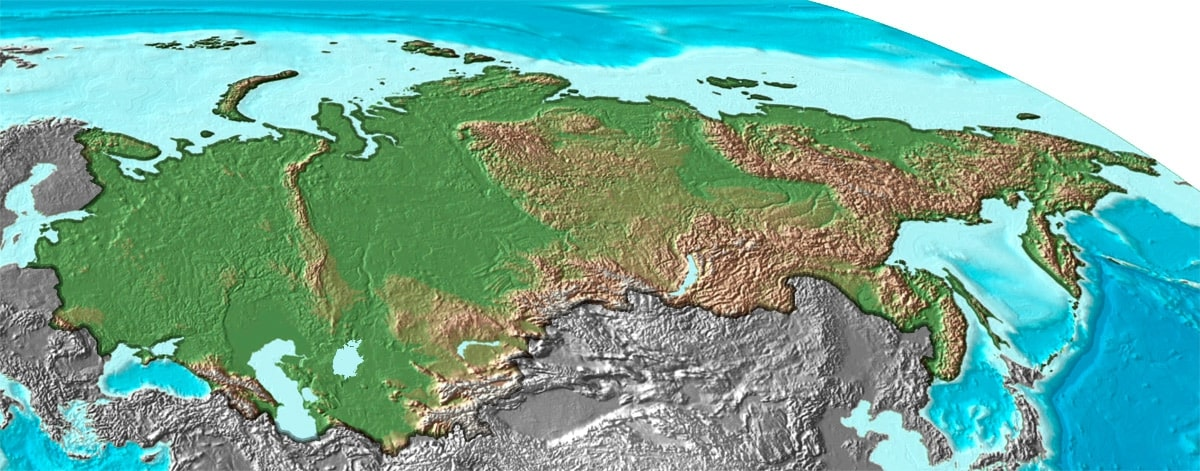
Physical map of the Soviet Union

The Soviet Union incorporated an area of over 22,402,200 square kilometres (8,649,500 sq mi), covering approximately one-sixth of Earth's land surface. It spanned most of Eurasia. Its largest and most populous republic was the Russian SFSR which covered roughly three-quarters of the surface area of the union, including the complete territory of contemporary Russia.

The Soviet Union was the world's largest country throughout its entire existence (1922–1991). It had a geographic center further north than all independent countries other than Canada, Iceland, Finland, and the countries of Scandinavia. About three-quarters of the country was above the 50th parallel north.

== Geographical particulars ==
=== Area ===
The country's 22,402,200 square kilometers (8,649,537.8 sq mi) included one-sixth of the Earth's land surface. Its western portion covered more than half of the land area of Europe but only a quarter of the total land area of the Soviet Union. This area was where the majority (about 72 percent) of the people lived and where most industrial and agricultural activities were concentrated. It was here, roughly between the Dnieper River and the Ural Mountains, that its predecessor, the Russian Empire, took shape and gradually over centuries expanded to the Pacific Ocean and into Central Asia. After the Russian Civil War, the newly formed Soviet Union took control over most of the empire's former territories.

=== Borders and neighbors ===
The Soviet Union had the longest borders of any contemporary country, extending approx. 60,000 km (37,000 mi). They measured some 10,000 kilometers (6,213.7 mi) from Kaliningrad on Gdańsk Bay in the west to Ratmanova Island (Big Diomede Island) in the Bering Strait - the rough equivalent of the distance from Edinburgh, Scotland, westwards to Nome, Alaska. From the tip of the Taymyr Peninsula on the Arctic Ocean to the Central Asian town of Kushka near the Afghan border extended almost 5,000 kilometers (3,106.8 mi) of mostly rugged, inhospitable terrain. The east–west expanse of the United States would easily have fit between the northern and southern borders of the Soviet Union at their extremities.

The Soviet Union had sixteen countries along its nearly 20,000 kilometers (12,427.4 mi) of land borders.

In Asia it had neighbors (from east to west) in:

- Japan (1922–1945)
- Manchukuo (1932–1945)
- North Korea
- China
- Mongolia
- Tuva (1922–1944; incorporated to USSR in 1944)
- Afghanistan
- Iran
- Turkey

In Europe it had borders with (from south to north):

- Romania
- Hungary
- Czechoslovakia
- Poland
- Lithuania (1939–40, 1991)
- Latvia (1922–40, 1991)
- Estonia (1922–40, 1991)
- Finland
- Norway (1947–1991)

=== Seacoast ===
Soviet shorelines were contiguous with a dozen seas and part of the water systems of three oceans — the Arctic, Atlantic, and Pacific. More than two-thirds of its borders were seacoast, making it the world's longest coastal boundary during its time. More than two-thirds of the coastline were well above the Arctic Circle. With the important exception of Murmansk, which received the warm currents of the Gulf Stream, the coast north of the Arctic Circle was usually locked in ice, frozen for up to ten months each year. Despite the extensive coastline, access to the world's oceans was both difficult and expensive.

In addition to having the world's longest coastline, the U.S.S.R. had the longest frontiers. To the north the country was bounded by the seas of the Arctic Ocean, and to the east were the seas of the Pacific. On the south the U.S.S.R. was bordered by North Korea, Mongolia, China, Afghanistan, Iran, and Turkey. On the southern frontier there were three seas: the Caspian Sea, the world's largest inland sea, as well as the almost completely landlocked Black Sea and Sea of Azov. Romania, Hungary, Czechoslovakia, Poland, Finland, and Norway lay to the west.

== Topography and drainage ==
Most geographers divide the vast Soviet territory into five natural zones that generally extend from west to east: the tundra zone; the taiga or forest zone; the steppe or plains zone; the arid zone; and the mountain zone. Most of the Soviet Union consisted of three plains (East European Plain, West Siberian Plain, and Turan Lowland), two plateaus (Central Siberian Plateau and Kazakh Upland), and a series of mountainous areas, concentrated for the most part in the extreme northeast or extending intermittently along the southern border. The West Siberian Plain, the world's largest, extended east from the Urals to the Yenisey River. Because the terrain and vegetation were uniforms in each of the natural zones, the Soviet Union, as a whole, presented an illusion of uniformity.

=== Tundra ===
Nevertheless, the Soviet territory contained all the major vegetation zones with the exception of tropical rain forest. Ten percent of Soviet territory is tundra, that is, a treeless marshy plain. The tundra was the Soviet Union's northernmost zone of snow and ice, stretching from the Finnish border in the west to the Bering Strait in the east and then running south along the Pacific coast to the earthquake and volcanic region of northern Kamchatka Peninsula. It was the land made famous by herds of wild reindeer, by white nights (dusk at midnight, dawn shortly thereafter) in summer, and by days of total darkness in winter. The long harsh winters and lack of sunshine allowed only mosses, lichens, and dwarf willows and shrubs to sprout low above the barren permafrost. Although the great Siberian rivers slowly traversed this zone in reaching the Arctic Ocean, drainage of the numerous lakes, ponds, and swamps was hampered by partial and intermittent thawing. Frost weathering is the most important physical process here, shaping a landscape modified by extensive glaciation in the last ice age.

=== Forests ===
The northern forests of spruce, fir, pine, and larch, collectively known as the taiga, made up the largest natural zone of the Soviet Union, an area about the size of the United States. Here too the winter is long and severe, as witnessed by the routine registering of the world's coldest temperatures for inhabited areas in the northeastern portion of this belt. The taiga zone extended in a broad band across the middle latitudes, stretching from the Finnish border in the west to the Verkhoyansk Range in northeastern Siberia and as far south as the southern shores of Lake Baykal. Isolated sections of taiga are found along mountain ranges, as in the southern part of the Urals, and in the Amur River Valley in the Far East. About 33 percent of the population lives in this zone, which, with the mixed forest zone, included most of the European part of the Soviet Union and the ancestral lands of the earliest Slavic settlers.

=== Steppes ===
Long associated with traditional images of Russian landscape and cossacks on horseback are the steppes, which are treeless, grassy plains. Although they covered only 15 percent of Soviet territory, the steppes were home to roughly 44 percent of the population. They extend for 4,000 kilometers from the Carpathian Mountains in the western Ukrainian Republic across most of the northern portion of the Kazakh Republic in Soviet Central Asia, between the taiga and arid zones, occupying a relatively narrow band of plains whose chernozem soils are some of the most fertile on earth. In a country of extremes, the steppe zone, with its moderate temperatures and normally adequate levels of sunshine and moisture, provides the most favorable conditions for human settlement and agriculture. Even here, however, agricultural yields were sometimes adversely affected by unpredictable levels of precipitation and occasional catastrophic droughts.

=== Arid zone ===
Below the steppes, and merging at times with them, was the arid zone: the semideserts and deserts of Soviet Central Asia and, particularly, of the Kazakh Republic. Portions of this zone became cotton- and rice-producing regions through intensive irrigation. For various reasons, including sparse settlement and a comparatively mild climate, the arid zone became the most prominent center for Soviet space exploration. One-quarter of the Soviet Union consisted of mountains or mountainous terrain. With the significant exceptions of the Ural Mountains and the mountains of eastern Siberia, the mountains occupy the southern periphery of the Soviet Union. The Urals, because they have traditionally been considered the natural boundary between Europe and Asia and because they are valuable sources of minerals, were the most famous of the country's nine major ranges. In terms of elevation (comparable to the Appalachians) they do not serve as a formidable natural barrier.

=== Alpine terrain ===
Truly alpine terrain was found in the southern mountain ranges. Between the Black and Caspian seas, for example, the Caucasus Mountains rose to impressive heights, marking a continuation of the boundary separating Europe from Asia. One of the peaks, Mount Elbrus, is the highest point in Europe at 5,642 meters. This range, extending to the northwest as the Crimean and Carpathian mountains and to the southeast as the Tien Shan and Pamirs, formed an imposing natural barrier between the Soviet Union and its neighbors to the south. The highest point in the Soviet Union, at 7,495 meters, was Mount Communism (Pik Kommunizma) in the Pamirs near the border with Afghanistan, Pakistan, and China. The Pamirs and the Tien Shan were offshoots of the tallest mountain chain in the world, the Himalayas. Eastern Siberia and the Soviet Far East are also mountainous regions, especially the volcanic peaks of the long Kamchatka Peninsula, which jutted down into the Sea of Okhotsk. The Soviet Far East, the southern portion of Soviet Central Asia, and the Caucasus were the Soviet Union's centers of seismic activity. In 1887, for example, a severe earthquake destroyed the city of Verny (present-day Almaty), and in December 1988 a massive quake demolished the Armenian city of Spitak and large sections of Kirovakan and Leninakan. The 1988 quake, one of the worst in Soviet history, claimed more than 25,000 lives.

=== Hydrosystems ===
The Soviet Union possessed both scarce and abundant water resources. With about 3 million rivers and approximately 4 million inland bodies of water, the Soviet Union held the largest fresh, surface-water resources of any country. But most of these resources (84 percent), as with so much of the Soviet resource-base, lay at a great distance from the majority of potential users; they flowed through sparsely populated territory and into the Arctic and Pacific oceans. In contrast, areas with the highest concentrations of the population (and therefore the highest demand for water supplies) tended to have the warmest climates and highest rates of evaporation. This resulted in barely adequate (or in some cases inadequate) water-resources in the areas of most need.

Nonetheless, as in many other countries, the earliest settlements sprang up on the rivers, where the majority of the urban population preferred to live. The Volga, Europe's longest river, became by far the Soviet Union's most important commercial waterway. Three of the country's twenty-three cities with more than one million inhabitants stood on its banks: Gorky, Kazan, and Kuybyshev.

The European part of the Soviet Union had extensive, highly developed, and heavily used water-resources, among them the key hydrosystems of the Volga, Kama, Dnepr, Dnestr, and Don rivers. As with fuels, however, the greatest water resources lay east of the Urals, deep in Siberia. Of the sixty-three rivers in the Soviet Union longer than 1,000 kilometers, forty were east of the Urals, including the four mighty rivers that drain Siberia as they flow northward to the Arctic Ocean: the Irtysh, Ob', Yenisey, and Lena rivers. The Amur River formed part of the winding and even at times there are tense boundaries between the Soviet Union and People's Republic of China. Taming and exploiting the hydroelectric potential of these systems became a monumental and highly publicized Soviet project. Some of the world's largest hydroelectric stations operated on these rivers. Hundreds of smaller hydroelectric power-plants and associated reservoirs were also constructed on the rivers. Thousands of kilometers of canals linked river- and lake-systems and provided essential sources of irrigation for farmland.

The Soviet Union's four million inland bodies of water chiefly resulted from extensive glaciation. Most prominently they included the Caspian Sea, the world's largest inland sea, and Lake Baikal, the world's deepest and most capacious freshwater lake. Lake Baikal alone held 85 percent of the freshwater resources of the lakes in the Soviet Union and 20 percent of the world's total. Other water resources included swampland - a sizable portion of territory (10 percent) - and glaciers in the northern areas.

=== Extreme points ===
North: Cape Fligely, Russian SFSR (81'30 N) South: Serhetabat, Turkmen SSR (35'12 N) West: Narmeln, Russian SFSR, (19'38 E) East: Dezhnev (Big Diomede), Russian SFSR, (169'01 W).

== Climate ==
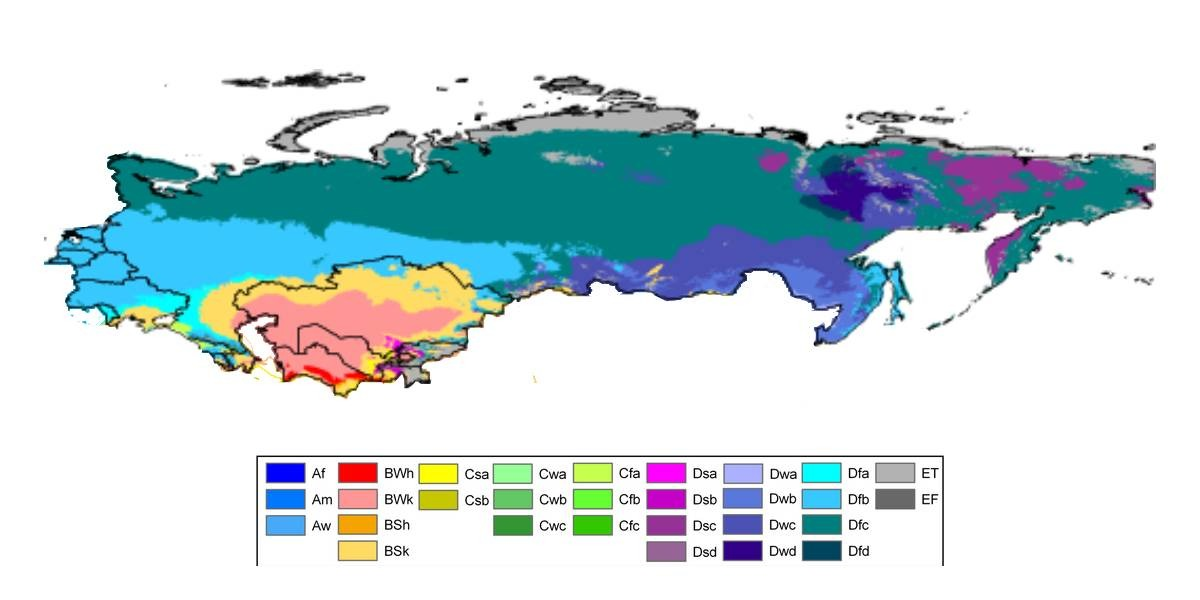
Köppen-Geiger Climate zones of the Soviet Union

=== Winter's impact ===
Notorious cold and long winters have been the focus of discussions on the Soviet Union's weather and climate. From the frozen depths of Siberia came baby mammoths perfectly preserved, locked in ice for several thousand years. Millions of square kilometers experience half a year of subfreezing temperatures and snow covered over subsoil that was permanently frozen in places to depths of several hundred meters. In northeastern Siberia, not far from Yakutsk, hardy settlers coped with January temperatures that consistently average −50 °C (−58 °F). Transportation routes, including entire railroad lines, had been redirected in winter to traverse rock-solid waterways and lakes.

Howling Arctic winds that produced coastal wind chills as low as −152 °C (−242 °F) and the burany, or blinding snowstorms of the steppe, were climatic manifestations of the USSR's close proximity to the North Pole and remoteness from oceans that tended to moderate the climate. A combination of the "Siberian high": cold, high-pressure systems in the east, together with wet, cold cyclonic systems in the west largely determined the overall weather patterns.

The long, cold winter had a profound impact on almost every aspect of life in the Soviet Union. It affected where and how long people live and work and what kinds of crops are grown and where they are grown (no part of the country has a year-round growing season). The length and severity of the winter, along with the sharp fluctuations in the mean summer and winter temperatures, imposed special requirements on many branches of the economy: in regions of permafrost, buildings must be constructed on pilings, and machinery must be made of specially tempered steel; transportation systems must be engineered to perform reliably in extremely low and high temperatures; the health care field and the textile industry are greatly affected by the ramifications of six to eight months of winter; and energy demands are multiplied by extended periods of darkness and cold.

=== Other climatic zones ===
Despite its well-deserved reputation as a generally snowy, icy northern country, the Soviet Union included other major climatic zones as well. According to Soviet geographers, most of their country is located in the temperate zone, which for them included all of the European portions except the southern part of Crimea and the Caucasus, all of Siberia, the Soviet Far East, and the plains of Soviet Central Asia and the southern Kazakh Republic.

Two areas outside the temperate zone demonstrated the climatic diversity of the Soviet Union: the Soviet Far East, under the influence of the Pacific Ocean, with a monsoonal climate; and the subtropical band of territory extending along the southern coast of the Soviet Union's most popular resort area, Crimea, through the Caucasus and into Soviet Central Asia, where there were deserts and oases.

With most of the land so far removed from the oceans and the moisture they provide, levels of precipitation in the Soviet Union was low to moderate. More than half the country received fewer than forty centimeters of rainfall each year, and most of Soviet Central Asia and northeastern Siberia could count on barely one-half that amount. The wettest parts were found in the small, lush subtropical region of the Caucasus and in the Soviet Far East along the Pacific coast.

== Land and natural resources ==
The Soviet resource base was by far the world's most extensive, ensuring self-sufficiency for its people in most resources for many years. The Soviet Union was usually first or second in the annual production of most of the world's strategic raw materials. However, most of the topography and climate resembles that of the northernmost portion of the North American continent. The northern forests and the plains to the south find their closest counterparts in the Yukon Territory and in the wide swath of land extending across most of Canada. Similarities in terrain, climate, and settlement patterns between Siberia and Alaska and Canada are unmistakable.

=== Land status ===
Only 11 percent of the USSR's land was arable. 16 percent was meadows and pasture. 41 percent was forest and woodland. Of the remaining, much is permafrost or tundra. However, the Soviet Union was richly endowed with almost every major category of natural resource. Drawing upon its vast holdings, it became the world leader in the production of oil, iron ore, manganese, and asbestos; it had the world's largest proven reserves of natural gas as well as coal, iron ore, timber, gold, manganese, lead, zinc, nickel, mercury, potash, phosphates, and most strategic minerals.

Self-sufficiency had traditionally been a powerful stimulus for exploring and developing the country's huge, yet widely dispersed, resource base. It remained a source of national pride that the Soviet Union, alone among the industrialized countries of the world, could claim the ability to satisfy almost all the requirements of its economy using its own natural resources. The abundance of fossil fuels supplied not just the Soviet Union's domestic needs. For many years, an ample surplus was exported to consumers in Eastern Europe and Western Europe, where it earned most of the Soviet Union's convertible currency.

=== Resources in Siberia ===
Although its historical, political, economic, and cultural ties bound it firmly to Europe, the Soviet Union was, with the inclusion of Siberia, also an Asian country. In the post-World War II period, Siberia became known as a new frontier because of its treasure of natural resources. As resource stocks were depleted in the heavily populated European section, tapping the less accessible but vital riches east of the Urals became a national priority. The best example of this process is fuels and energy. The depletion of readily accessible fuel resources west of the Urals caused development and exploitation to shift to the inhospitable terrain of western Siberia, which in the 1970s and 1980s displaced the Volga-Ural and the southern European regions as the country's primary supplier of fuel and energy. Fierce cold, permafrost, and persistent flooding made this exploitation costly and difficult.

== Environmental concerns ==
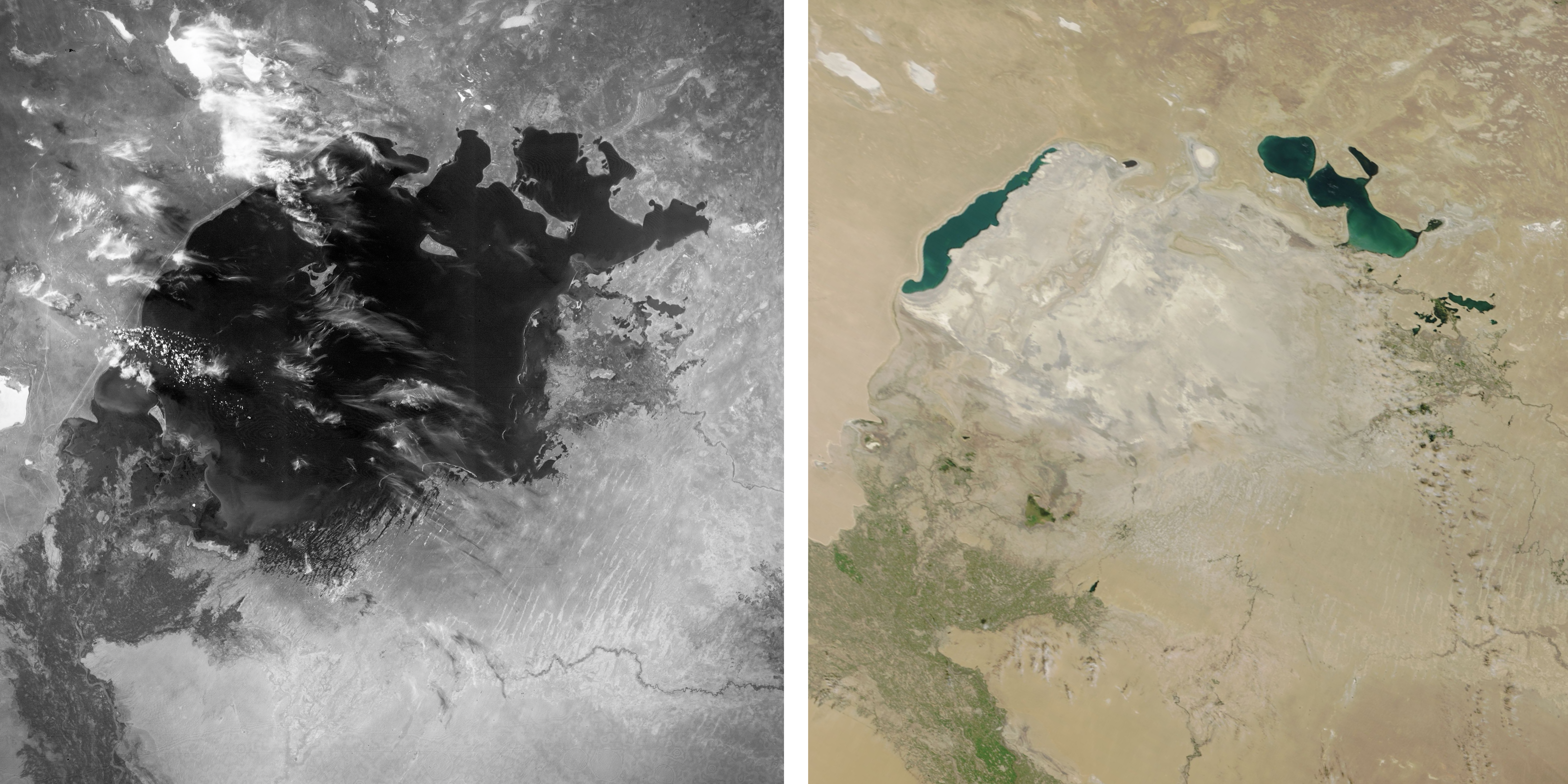
One of the many impacts of the approach to the environment in the USSR is the Aral Sea.

The Soviet Union transformed, often radically, the country's physical environment. In the 1970s and 1980s, Soviet citizens, from the highest officials to ordinary factory workers and farmers, began to examine negative aspects of this transformation and to call for more prudent use of natural resources and greater concern for environmental protection.

=== Before 1985 ===
In spite of a series of environmental laws and regulations passed in the 1970s, authentic environmental protection in the Soviet Union did not become a major concern until General Secretary Mikhail Gorbachev came to power in March 1985. Without an established regulatory agency and an environmental protection infrastructure, enforcement of existing laws was largely ignored. Only occasional and isolated references appeared on such issues as air and water pollution, soil erosion, and wasteful use of natural resources in the 1970s. There were various reasons for not implementing environmental safeguards. In cases where land and industry were state owned and managed when air and water were polluted, the state was most often the agent of this pollution. Second, and this was true especially under Joseph Stalin's leadership, the resource base of the country was viewed as limitless and free. Third, in the Cold War rush to modernize and to develop heavy industry, concern for damage to the environment and related damage to the health of Soviet citizens would have been viewed as detrimental to progress. Fourth, advanced means of pollution control and environmental protection can be an expensive, high-technology industry, and even in the mid-1980s many of the Soviet Union's systems to control harmful emissions were inoperable or of foreign manufacture.

=== 1985 and after ===
Under Gorbachev's leadership, the official attitude toward the environment changed. Various social and economic factors helped produce this change. To maintain economic growth through the 1980s, a period in which the labor force had been declining significantly, intensive and more prudent use of both natural and human resources was required. At the same time, glasnost provided an outlet for widespread discussion of environmental issues, and a genuine grass-roots ecological movement arose to champion causes similar to the ecological concerns of the West. Public campaigns were mounted to protect Lake Baykal from industrial pollution and to halt the precipitous decline in the water levels of the Caspian Sea, the Sea of Azov, and, most urgently, the Aral Sea. A large scheme to divert the northern rivers southward had been counted on to replenish these seas, but for both economic and environmental reasons, the project was canceled in 1986. Without this diversion project, the Aral Sea, once a body of water larger than any of the Great Lakes except Lake Superior, seemed destined to become the world's largest salt flat as early as the year 2010. By 1987 so much water had been siphoned off for irrigation of cotton and rice fields south and east of the sea that all shipping and commercial fishing had ceased. Former seaports, active as late as 1973, were reported to be forty to sixty kilometers from the water's edge. Belatedly recognizing the gravity of the situation for the 3 million inhabitants of the Aral region, government officials declared it an ecological disaster area.

With respect to air pollution, mass demonstrations protesting unhealthy conditions were held in cities such as Yerevan in the Armenian SSR. Official reports confirmed that more than 100 of the largest Soviet cities registered air quality indexes ten times worse than permissible levels. In one of the most publicized cases, the inhabitants of Kirishi, a city not far from Leningrad, succeeded in closing a chemical plant whose toxic emissions were found to be harming—and in some cases killing—the city's residents. Finally, separate, highly publicized cases of man-made disasters, the most prominent of which was the Chernobyl' nuclear power plant accident in 1986, highlighted the fragility of the main production -nature relationship in the Soviet Union and forced a reconsideration of traditional attitudes and policies toward industrialization and development.

As part of the process of restructuring (perestroika), in the 1980s concrete steps were taken to strengthen environmental protection and to provide the country with an effective mechanism for implementing policy and ensuring compliance. Two specific indications of this were the inclusion of a new section devoted to environmental protection in the annual statistical yearbook and the establishment of the State Committee for the Protection of Nature (Gosudarstvennyi komitet po okhrane prirody—Goskompriroda) early in 1988.

Despite these measures, decades of environmental degradation caused by severe air and water pollution and land abuse are unlikely to be remedied soon or easily. Solving these critical problems will require not only a major redirection of capital and labor but also a fundamental change in the entire Soviet approach to industrial and agricultural production and resource exploitation and consumption.

== Statistics ==
Size: Approximately 22,402,200 square kilometers.

Location: Occupied eastern portion of the European continent and northern portion of Asian continent. Most of the country north of 50° north latitude.

Topography: Vast steppe with low hills west of Ural Mountains; extensive coniferous forest and tundra in Siberia; deserts in Central Asia; mountains along southern boundaries.

Climate: Generally temperate to Arctic continental. Winters varied from short and cold along Black Sea to long and frigid in Siberia. Summers varied from hot in southern deserts to cool along Arctic coast. Weather usually harsh and unpredictable. Generally dry with more than half of country receiving fewer than forty centimeters of rainfall per year, most of Soviet Central Asia northeastern Siberia receiving only half that amount.

Water Boundaries: 42,777 kilometers washed by oceanic systems of Arctic, Atlantic, and Pacific.

Land Use: 11 percent of land arable; 16 percent meadows and pasture; 41 percent forest and woodland; and 32 percent other, including tundra.

Natural Resources: Oil, natural gas, coal, iron ore, timber, gold, manganese, lead, zinc, nickel, mercury, potash, phosphates, and most strategic minerals.

Above section:.

== See also ==
- Geography of Russia
- Geography of Ukraine
- Geography of Belarus
- Geography of Estonia
- Geography of Lithuania
- Geography of Latvia
- Geography of Moldova
- Geography of Kazakhstan
- Geography of Georgia
- Geography of Uzbekistan
- Geography of Tajikistan
- Geography of Azerbaijan
- Geography of Kyrgyzstan
- Geography of Turkmenistan
- Geography of Armenia
