= Nalanda Gedige =

Ancient temple in Sri Lanka

- නාලන්දා ගෙඩිගේ
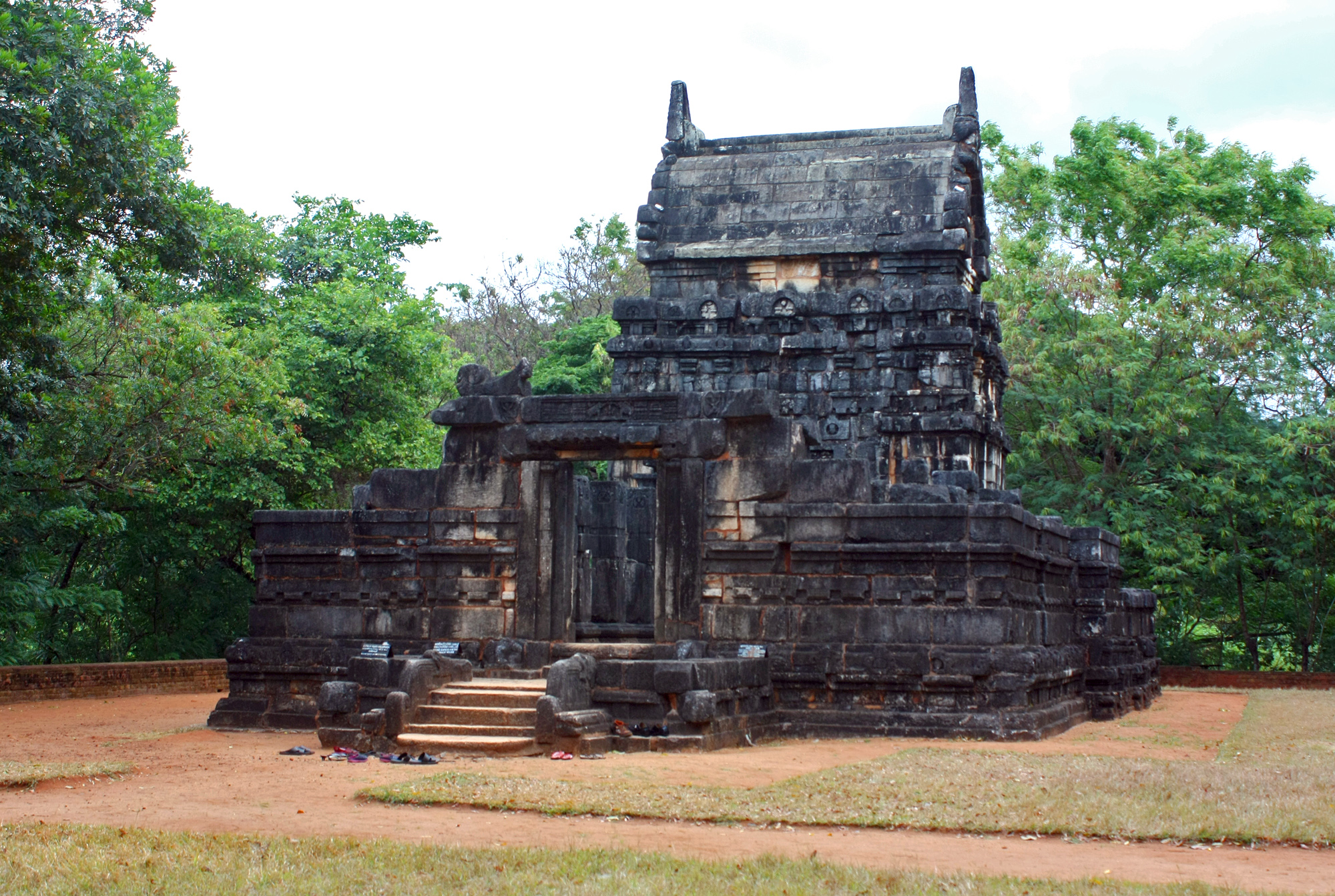
- The Gedige image house

Religion
- Affiliation: Buddhism
- District: Matale
- Province: Central Province

Location
- Location: Nalanda
- Country: Sri Lanka
- Interactive map of Nalanda Gedige
- Coordinates: 7°40′11″N 80°38′44″E

Architecture
- Type: Gedige image house

Nalanda Gedige (Sinhala: නාලන්ද ගෙඩිගේ; Tamil: நாளாந்த கடிகை) is an ancient complete stone temple near Matale, Sri Lanka and its original site is considered the geographical centre of Sri Lanka. The building was constructed between the 8th and 10th centuries with dravidian architecture in (Pallava style) and is believed to have been used by Buddhists. A pillar inscription of the 9-10th century A.D. that was unearthed from the site revealed Nalanda Gedige was a Buddhist monastery. Recorded in the Sinhala language, it includes a code of regulations made for the temple. Also some scholars describe this building as a dravidian architecture dedicated to a Mahayana cult with pronounced Tantric learning and known as an ancient monument of possible Vajrayana (Tantric) Buddhist affinities.

Nalanda Gedige is designed on the lines of a Hindu temple with a mandapa, an entrance hall (originally roofed), a short passage to a bare cello, and an ambulatory round the holy centre. A limited number of the original Hindu deity statuettes exist within the temple, however, a statue of the God Kubera appears on the south side of the tympanum over the sanctuary, a feature that can only be seen in Sri Lanka.

The richly decorated facade sections, laboriously reassembled in 1975, are predominantly in the South Indian style. Although they cannot be precisely dated, they are believed to have originated sometime between the 8 to 11th centuries. Originally build by Pallavan king later on Sinhalese government put the Buddha statue inside you can see the statue appearance and the building age originally from the Tamil Pallava King

== History ==
This building was made 1000 years ago. This was a period of great turmoil on the island with South Indian kings establishing themselves in the wake of the decline of the Sinhalese monarchy. It is possible that Nalanda Gedige was a bold attempt at a fusion of Sinhalese cultures.

The history of Nalanda Gedige as an archaeological site began in 1893, when, according to then Archaeological Commissioner, H. C. P. Bell, "land was acquired round this little-known and solitary shrine of granite construction, popularly styled gedige. It is situated on raised ground in paddy fields, picturesquely surrounded by low hills and wooded hamlets. In 1911 a small gang was detached from the labour force at Sigiriya to thoroughly root out all the jungle growth upon and around the ruin besides cutting still further back the earth silt hiding the bold stylites upon which the fane stands. Very special importance attaches to this unique temple, as it is the sole example yet discovered in Ceylon of composite styles of architecture judiciously blended to form a delightfully homogeneous edifice."

Bell had significant plans for the restoration of the Nalanda Gedige - involving its dismantlement and relocation - as is apparent from his report of 1912: "It will be necessary to gradually extend the open space to the north and east of the gedige ruin, so far as practicable, in reasonable expectation of discovering other buried members of the structure, before it is partially dismantled with a view to correct reconstruction. For this fine edifice cannot be allowed to remain in its present semi-deceptive elevation, when all stones on the ground have been recovered from the earth."

However, nothing transpired until much later, in the 1980s, when the shrine was threatened with inundation by the waters of the newly created Bowatenne Tank. The opportunity was taken to dismantle the ruin and rebuild it on the bund(retaining wall) of the tank, high above the waters. It stands now reconstructed beside the tank and is approached by a flower-edged causeway with a magnificent backdrop of tree-clad hills.

Nalanda Gedige is a curious hybrid of Buddhist and Hindu architecture. Some of the design elements are distinctly Hindu, such as the mandapam or hall of waiting. Yet there is no sign of Hindu gods. There are erotic but eroded Tantric Buddhist carvings, much like the famous ones at Khajuraho in India. The richly decorated façade sections are in the 7th-century style which flourished in Madras, South India. However, the southern section has a semi-circular niche containing in high relief a squat figure of Kuvera, the god of wealth, seated on a lotus plinth - an image that is only found in Sri Lanka.

Roland Raven-Hart, writing in Ceylon: History in Stone (1964) describes this hybridisation: "Elsewhere there are plenty of Hindu buildings, and plenty of Buddhist ones, and some muddled mongrels; but here the styles are interwoven. The ground plan is Buddhist, the vestibule pure Hindu and so is the little windowless shrine: the plain moonstone and crocodile balustrade and rivers of dwarfs and architrave of the doorway are Sinhalese, and jambs Tamilian; even the sculptures are fairly shared. The whole effect is charming and for me unexpectedly classical, nor did I find the exterior "over-richly decorated" as did Bell, though it is crowded with pilasters and horseshoe false windows and more jolly dwarfs. And the dome must have been a worthy climax when all its four faces were present, each with horseshoe niche and statue, instead of the one only which was found."

== Tourists attraction ==
Nalanda is situated one km to the east of the A9 route 20 km north of Aluvihare near Kandy.

== Gallery ==
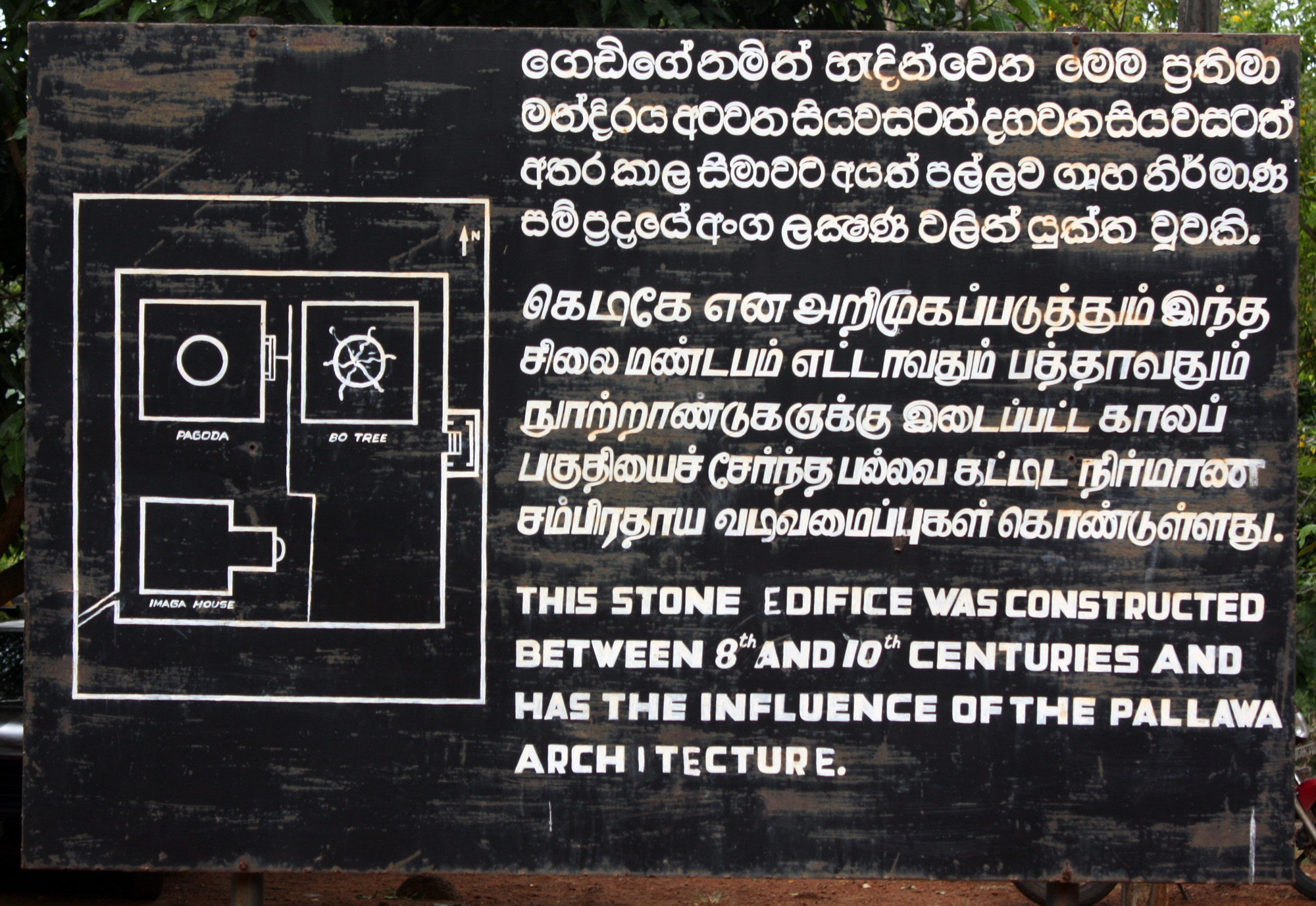
Display board at the entrance

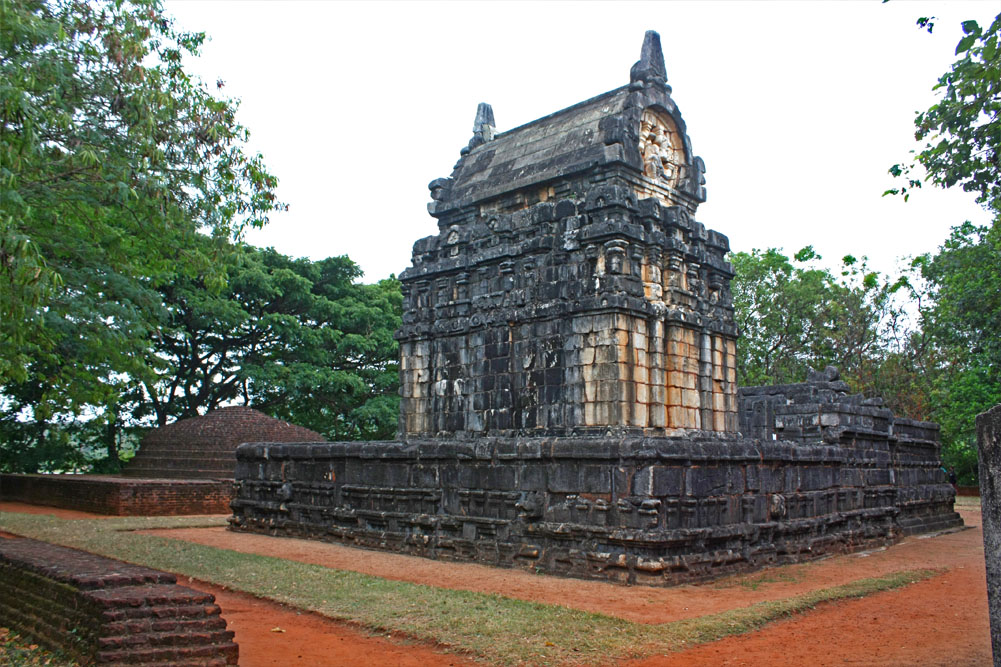
Rear view

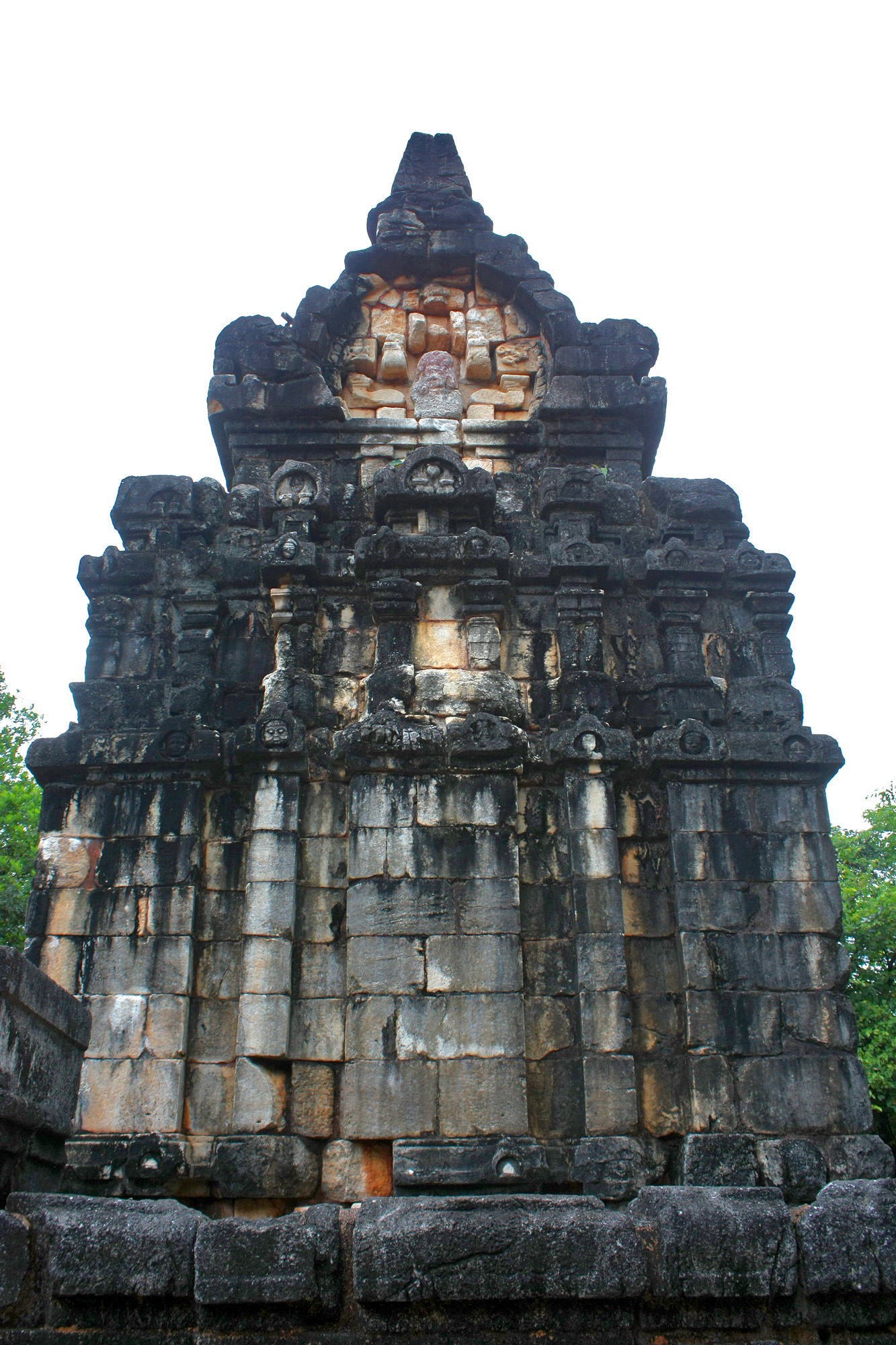
Left side view

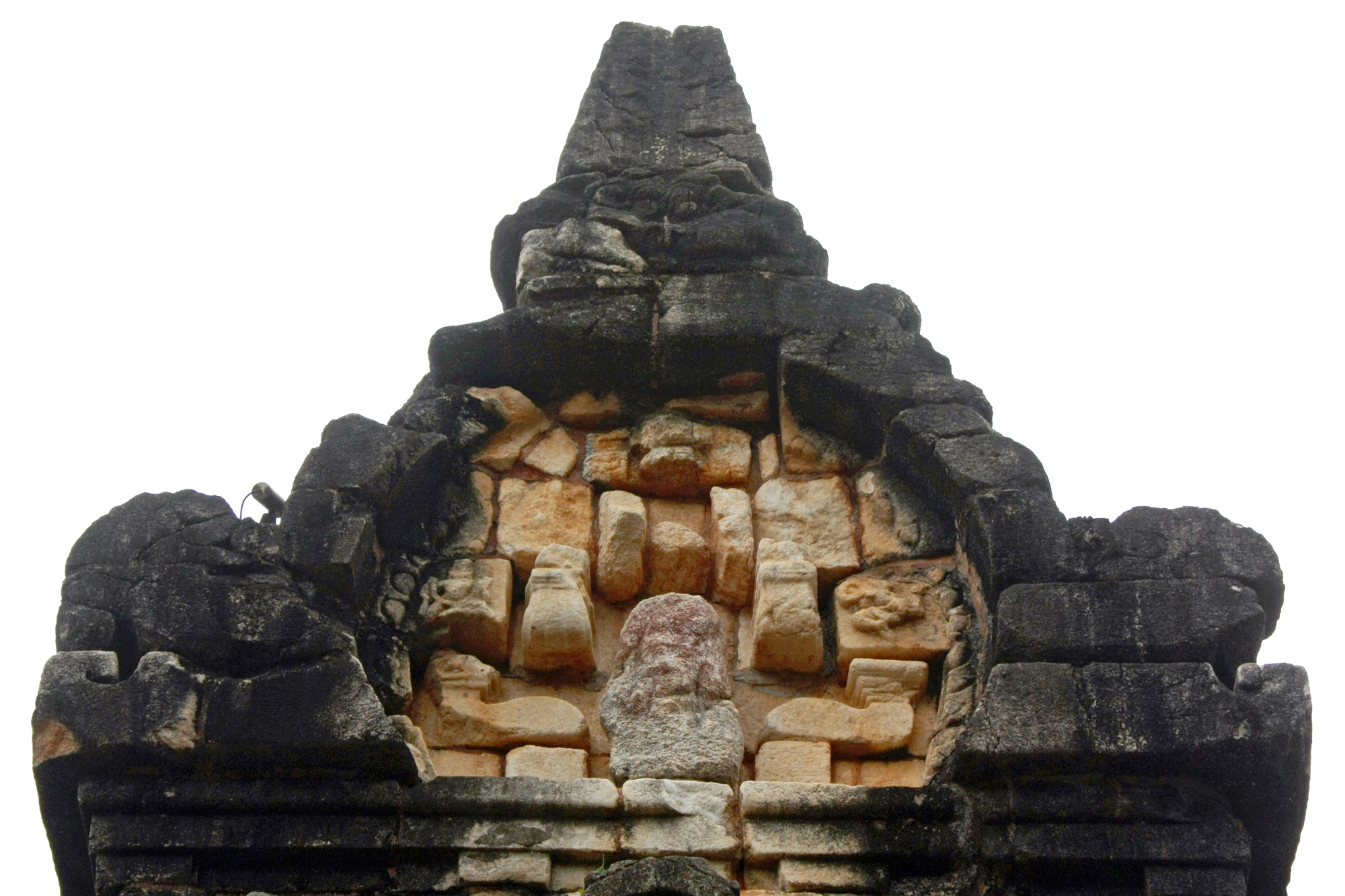
Top close up view

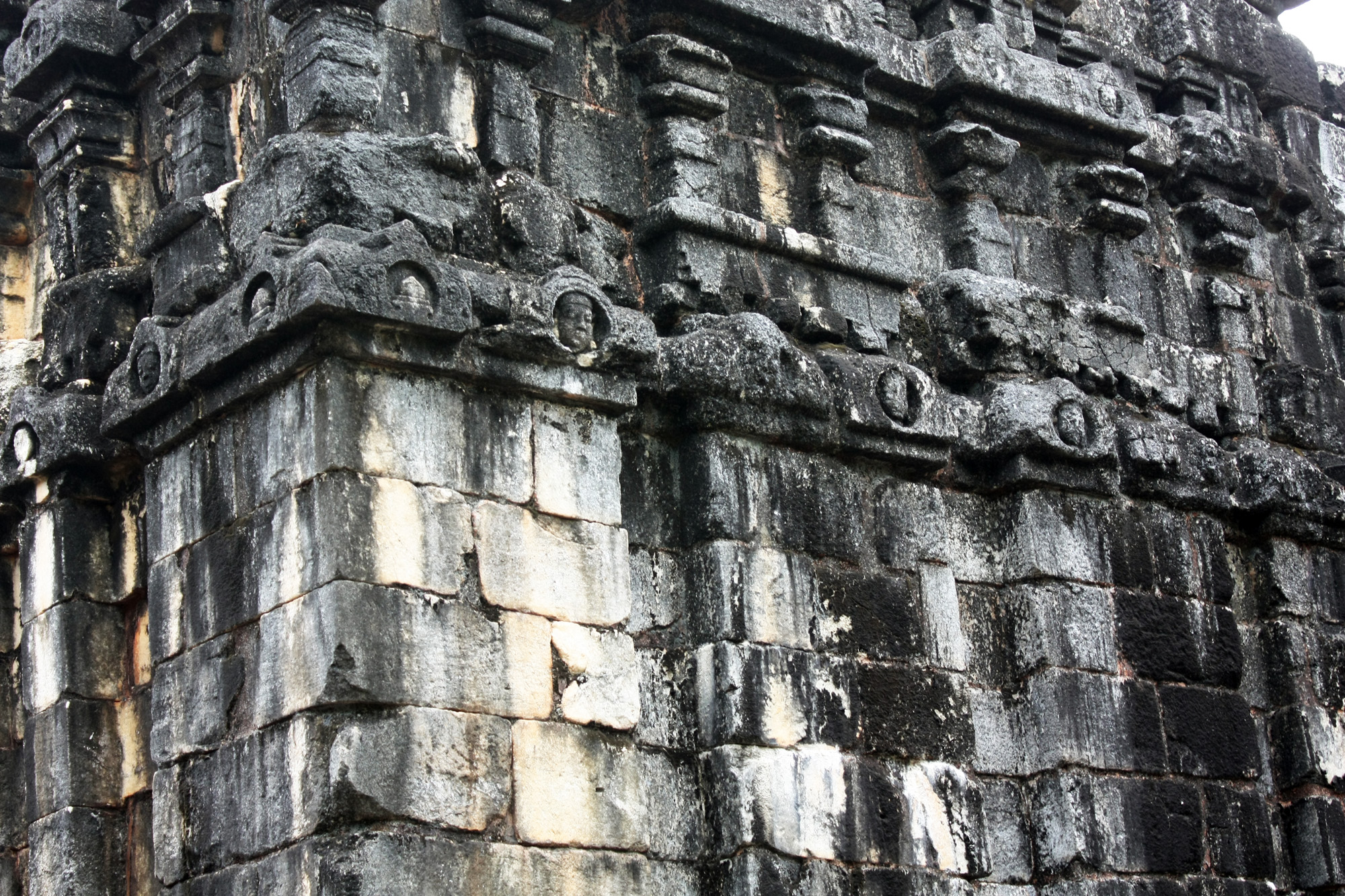
Wall details

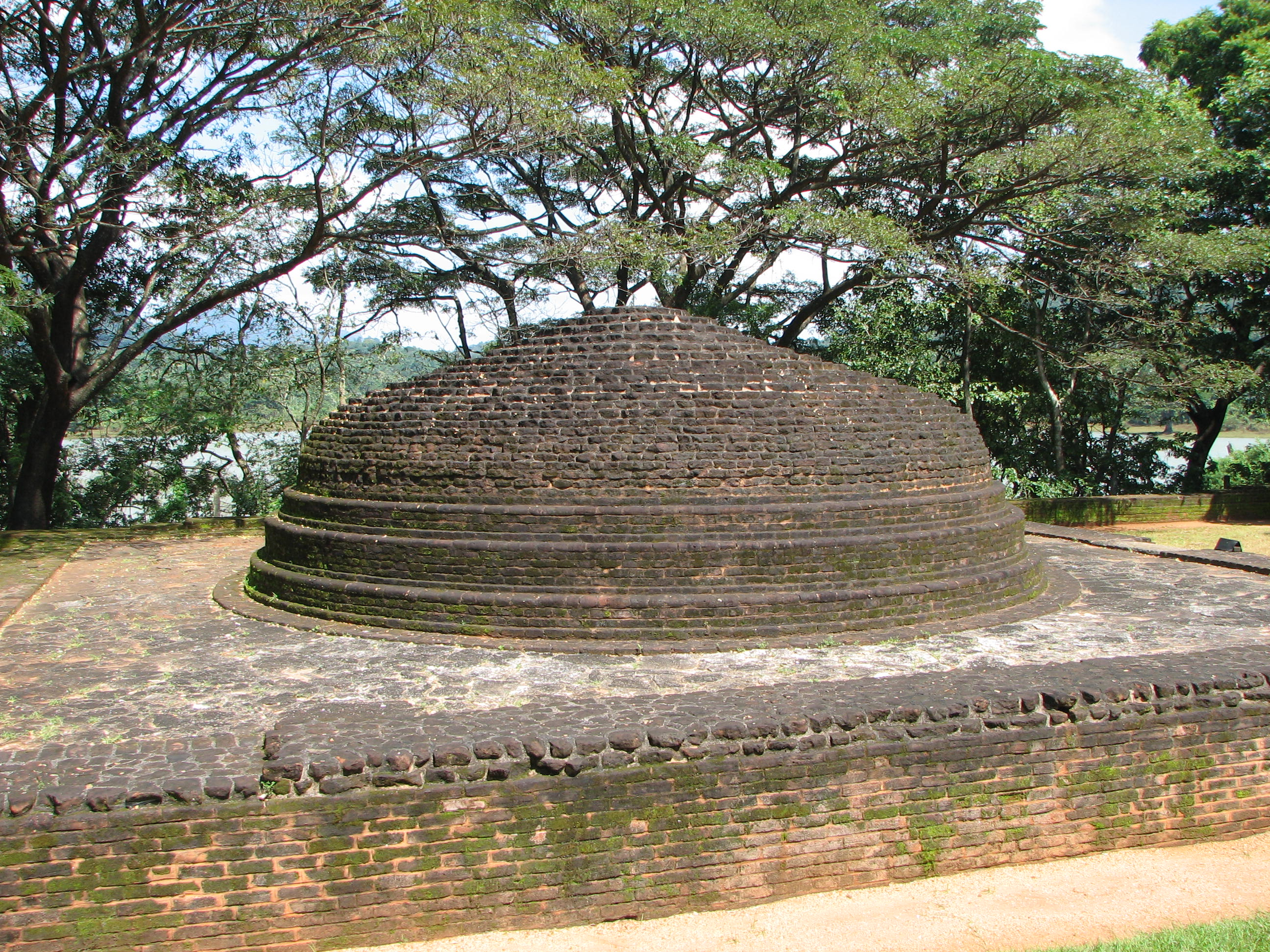
Stupa

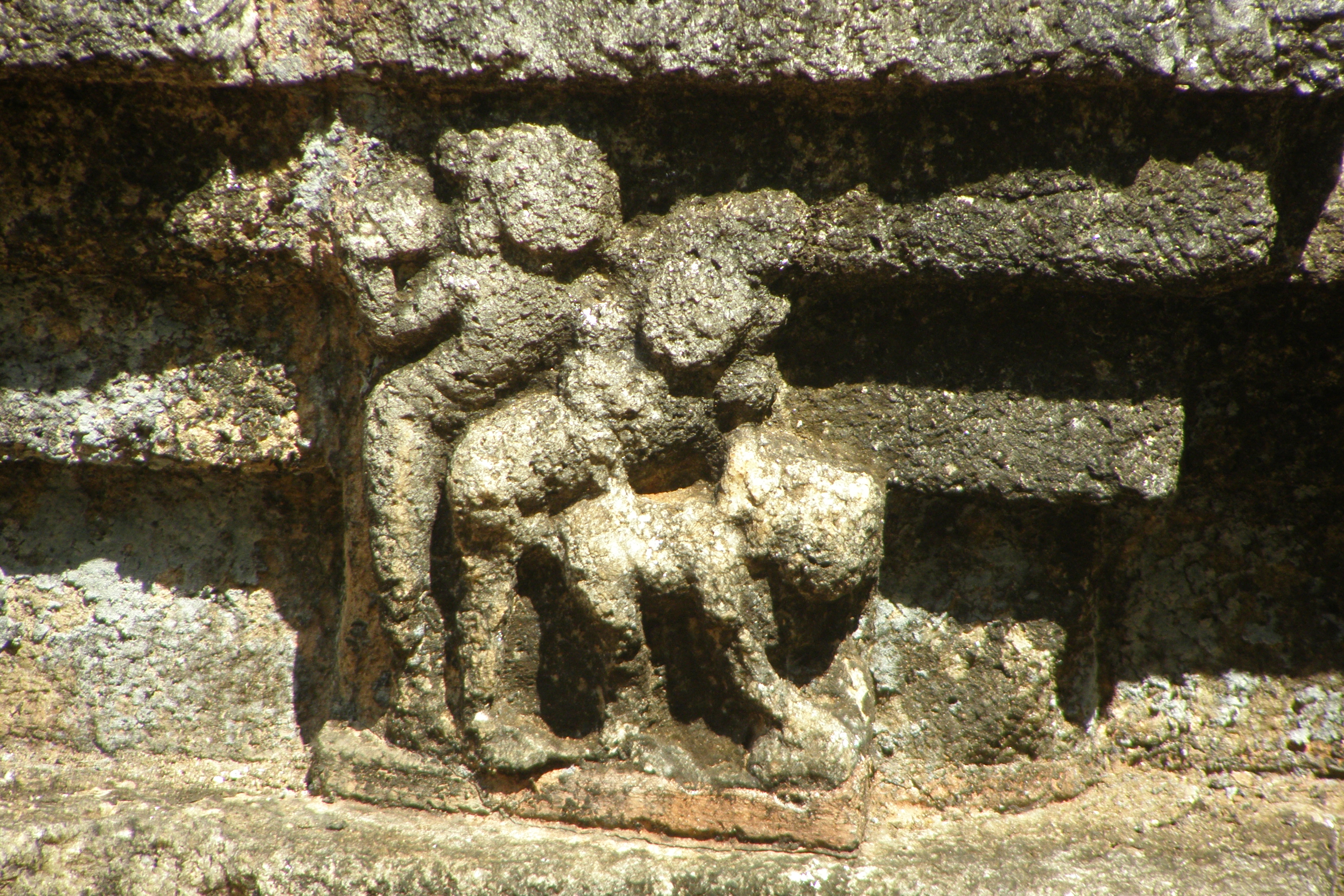
Carving on wall

== See also ==
- Ancient constructions of Sri Lanka
- Hinduism in Sri Lanka
- Buddhism in Sri Lanka

== Sources ==
- Anna Aleksandra Ślączka, Anna Aleksandra Ślączka (2007). Temple consecration rituals in ancient India: text and archaeology. Vol. 26 of Brill's indological library. BRILL. p. 343. ISBN 9789004158436. "Stone container with twenty-five compartments.. This temple was built in Dravidian style and it seems to have dedicated to Visnu(Bell 1914b: 49). It was presumably constructed in the 11th century AD(Bell 1914b: 43)."
- J.Herramann and E. Zurcher, J. Harmatta, J. K. Litvak, R. Lonis, T. Obenga, R. Thanmar and Zhou Yiliang (1996). "Sri Lanka and South-East Asia". History of Humanity: From the seventh century BC to the seventh century AD. Vol. III. Ney York: UNESCO. p. 100. ISBN 92-3-102812-X. "Pallava art exerted a strong influence not only on other parts of South India but also on Sri Lanka and South-east Asia. The site of Isurumuniya near Anuradhapura in Sri Lanka reflects the influence of the Mapallapuram murals while the Nalanda Gedige near Kany shows a clear influence of Pallava Temple in Kanchipuram."
- Nandasena Mudiyanse, Nandasena Mudiyanse (1967). Mahayana monuments in Ceylon. Colombo, Sri Lanka: M. D. Gunasena. p. 343. LCCN sa68008358. "Kuvera-Nalanda Gedige, Another example of this deity is noticeable on tympanum of the gedige at Nalanda."
- Prematilleke, P. L., Nalanda - A Short Guide to the 'Gedige' Shrine, Central Cultural Fund, Ministry of Cultural Affairs, Sri Lanka, 1985.
