= Geographical centre =

Geographical term

In geography, the centroid of the two-dimensional shape of a region of Earth's surface (projected radially to sea level or onto a geoid surface) is known as its geographic centre or geographical centre or (less commonly) gravitational centre. The study of geographic centers is called centrography. Informally, determining the centroid is often described as finding the point upon which the shape (cut from a uniform plane) would balance. This method is also sometimes described as the "gravitational method".

One example of a refined approach using an azimuthal equidistant projection, also potentially incorporating an iterative process, was described by Peter A. Rogerson in 2015. The abstract says "the new method minimizes the sum of squared great circle distances from all points in the region to the center". However, as that property is also true of a centroid (of area), this aspect is effectively just different terminology for determining the centroid.

In 2019, New Zealand's GNS Science also used an iterative approach (and a variety of different projections) when determining a centre position for New Zealand's extended continental shelf.

However, other methods have also been proposed or used to determine the centres of various countries and regions. These include:

- centroid of volume (incorporating elevations into calculations), instead of the more usual centroid of area as described above.
- centre point of a bounding box completely enclosing the area. While relatively easy to determine, a centre point calculated using this method will generally also vary (relative to the shape of the landmass or region) depending on the orientation of the bounding box to the area under consideration. In this sense it is not a robust method.
- finding the longitude that divides the region into two equal area parts to the east and west, and then similarly the latitude that divides the region into two equal area parts to the north and south. Like the bounding box approach described above this method would not generally locate precisely the same point if the same shaped region was oriented differently.

As noted in a United States Geological Survey document, "There is no generally accepted definition of geographic center, and no completely satisfactory method for determining it."

In general, there is room for debate around various details such as whether or not to include islands and similarly, large bodies of water, how best to handle the curvature of the Earth (a more significant factor with larger regions) and closely related to that issue, which map projection to use.

== Definition and methods ==
According to the United States Geological Survey there is no generally agreed upon definition of a geographic center and no satisfying method to determine it, while research into it and study of centrography is ongoing. Generally centrography deals with point pattern analysis.

=== Definition ===
Geometrically defined the central point of all land is the centroid of all land surfaces within the two dimensions of the Geoid surface which approximates the Earth's outer shape. The term centre of minimum distance specifies the concept more precisely as the domain is the sphere surface without boundary and not the three-dimensional body.

Explained in a different way, it is the location on the surface of Earth where the sum of distances to all locations on land is the smallest. Assuming an airplane with infinite energy and resources, if one were to fly from one start location to any location on land and back again, and repeat this from the same start location to all possible destinations, the starting location where the total travel distance is the smallest would be the geographical centre of Earth.

Its distance definition follows the shortest path on the surface of Earth along the great circle (orthodrome).

=== Methods ===
The calculation method of the median point in centrography is an often applied one, but a sensitive one. Refinement of the median point can be achieved by increasing the division of the area in quartilides, decilides and centrilides.

Another method to determine a center is making use of the center of gravity of an area.

== History of centrography ==
Around the world throughout history many real and illusive places were identified as axis mundi or centers of the world. Examples among many throughout history and across the world are Delphi (the "omphalos", the navel of the world), Jerusalem, Cusco, the Great Pyramid of Giza, and Prayagraj (Allahabad, India).

The modern study of centrography dates back to 1872, with the publishing of work on the issue by Julius Erasmus Hilgard. By the 1930s it had developed into a broad field of combining cartography and statistical data.

== Center of Earth's land ==
Several calculations of the geographic center of Earth's land have arrived somewhere along the Romanian Black Sea coast, with older calculations placing it at 43°31′00″N 28°20′00″E, near the coastal town of Balchik (Bulgaria)

The geographical centre of Earth is the geometric centre of all land surfaces on Earth. Earth's land is unevenly distributed across the surface of Earth, making the calculation of the center a challenge that has been attempted through different geographic approaches, but hasn't produced widely agreed results and satisfying methods.

Throughout history many different places have been called centers of the world.

Scientific calculations in 1944 identified the median point of Earth's land area to be in Tarnopol (Galicia, Ukraine) at 49°20′00″N 26°20′14″E excluding Antarctic sea ice. If Antarctic sea ice is included, the median point is instead in İzmir (Turkey) at 38°25′00″N 27°25′00″E. If the center of gravity is used, the center is instead at 43°31′00″N 28°20′00″E, near the Black Sea coastal town of Balchik (Bulgaria).

Calculations from 2002 have again calculated the center of Earth's land somewhere along the Romanian Black Sea coast, depending on the amount of Antarctic ice taken into account. Additionally the center of the land hemisphere was also calculated, finding a central area spanning two focal areas around Brittany to the Mediterranean sea between the Balearic Islands and Catalonia.

=== Other claims ===
==== Giza ====
In 1864, Charles Piazzi Smyth, Astronomer Royal for Scotland, gave in his book Our Inheritance in the Great Pyramid the coordinates with 30°00′N 31°00′E, the location of the Great Pyramid of Giza in Egypt. He stated that this had been calculated by "carefully summing up all the dry land habitable by man all the wide world over".

In October of that year, Smyth proposed to position the prime meridian at the longitude of the Great Pyramid because there it would "pass over more land than [at] any other [location]". He also argued the cultural significance of the location and its vicinity to Jerusalem. The expert committee deciding the issue, however, voted for Greenwich because "so many ships used the port of London".

The claim of Giza being the center of all land persisted to some extent, such as among Freemasons in 1919.

=== Other types ===
==== Hemispheric ====
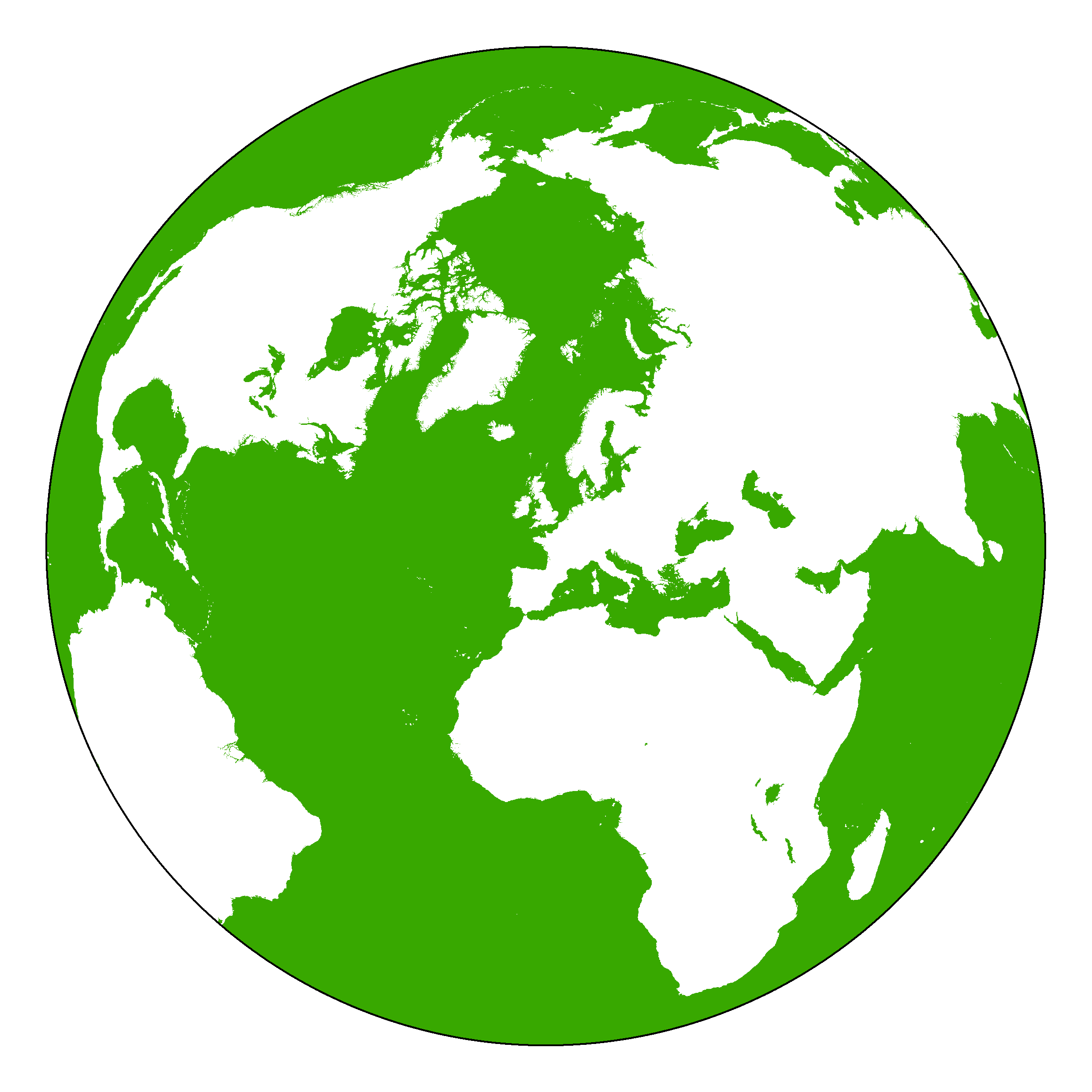
The land hemisphere

In 2002, the center of the land hemisphere was calculated as a central area spanning two focal points around Brittany and the Mediterranean Sea between the Balearic Islands and Catalonia.

==== Geophysic ====
Calculations based on three-dimensional objects, for example the Newtonian gravity centre of the whole Earth (physical barycentre) or the Newtonian gravity centre of only the continents as uniform thick three-dimensional objects. Those centres can be found inside Earth mostly near its core.

The center of gravity method of determining the geographic center of Earth's land has produced a point on Earth's surface near the Black Sea coastal town of Balchik (Bulgaria) at 43°31′00″N 28°20′00″E.

== Regional centers ==
=== Geographic centres in Africa ===
- Geographic Centre of Uganda (Amolatar Monument)

=== Geographic centres in Asia ===
- Geographical midpoints of Asia, in China or Russia
- Geographical centre of India
  - Zero Mile Stone (Nagpur)
- Geographic center of Iran
- Geographic centre of Sri Lanka
- Geographical centre of the Korean Peninsula
- Geographical centre of the Philippines
- Geographical centre of the Russian Federation
- Geographical centre of the Soviet Union
- Geographic center of Taiwan

=== Geographic centres in Europe ===
- Geographical midpoint of Europe
- Geographical centre of Austria
- Geographic center of Belarus
- Geographical centre of Belgium (Nil-Saint-Vincent-Saint-Martin)
- Geographical centre of Estonia (Paenasti)
- Geographical centre of Germany (Niederdorla)
  - Central Germany (geography)
- Geographical centre of Hungary (Pusztavacs)
- Geographical centre of Ireland
- Geographical centre of Lithuania (Ruoščiai)
- Geographical centre of Norway
- Geographical centre of Poland
- Geographical center of Romania (Făgăraș)
- Geographical centre of the Russian Federation (Lake Vivi)
- Geographical centre of Serbia (Drača)
- Geographical centre of Slovenia
- Geographical centre of the Soviet Union
- Geographical center of Spain (Cerro de los Ángeles)
- Geographical center of Sweden
- Geographical centre of Switzerland
- Centre points of the United Kingdom
  - Geographical centre of Great Britain (Brennand Farm)
  - Geographic centre of England
  - Geographical centre of Scotland
  - Geographic centre of Wales (Cwmystwyth)

=== Geographic centres in North America ===
- Geographic center of North America
- Geographic centre of Canada
- Geographic center of the United States
  - List of geographic centers of the United States

=== Geographic centres in Oceania ===
- Centre points of Australia
- Geographic centre of New Zealand

=== Geographic centres in South America ===
- Geographical Center of South America
- Geographical Center of Colombia

== Other types of geographic centers ==
Various definitions of the centre of the world exist, from the geographic median point and center of gravity, to socio-economic ones, or cultural such as an axis mundi.

=== Pole of inaccessibility ===
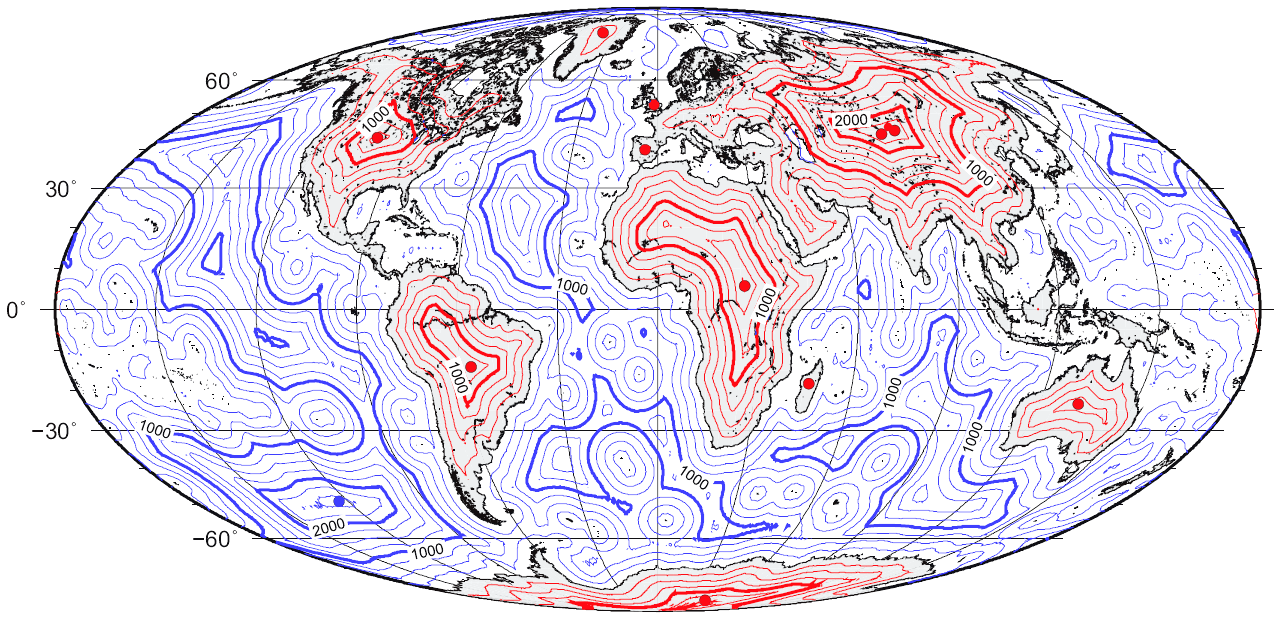
Map of distance to the nearest coastline (including oceanic islands, but not lakes) with red spots marking the poles of inaccessibility of main landmasses, Great Britain, and the Iberian Peninsula, and a blue dot marking the oceanic pole of inaccessibility. Thin isolines are 250 km (160 mi) apart; thick lines 1,000 km (620 mi). Mollweide projection.

In geography, a pole of inaccessibility is the farthest (or the most difficult to reach) location in a given landmass, sea, or other topographical feature, starting from a given boundary, relative to a given criterion. Often it refers to the most distant point from the coastline, implying the farthest point into a landmass from the shore, or the farthest point into a body of water from the shore. In these cases, a pole of inaccessibility is the center of a maximally large circle that can be drawn within an area of interest only touching but not crossing a coastline. Where a coast is imprecisely defined, the pole will be similarly imprecise.

=== Demographic ===
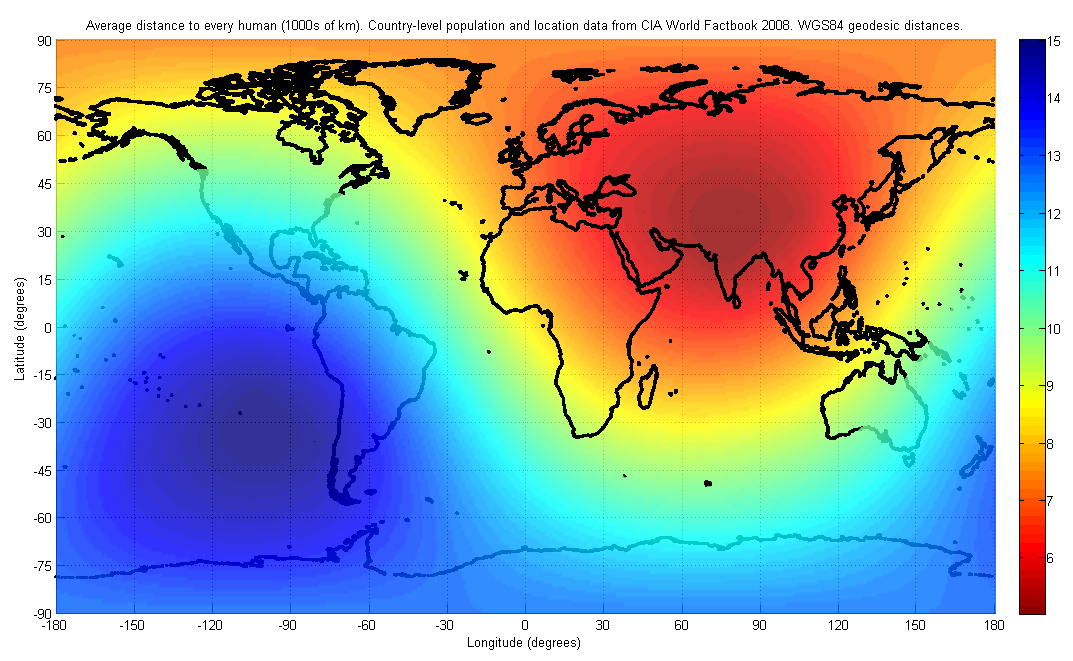
For representational purposes only: The point on Earth closest to everyone in the world on average was calculated to be in Central Asia, with a mean distance of 5,000 kilometers (3,000 mi). Its antipodal point is correspondingly the farthest point from everyone on Earth, and is located in the South Pacific near Easter Island, with a mean distance of 15,000 kilometers (9,300 mi). The data used by this figure is lumped at the country level, and is therefore precise only to country-scale distances.

In demographics, the center of population (or population center) of a region is a geographical point that describes a centerpoint of the region's population. There are several ways of defining such a "center point", leading to different geographical locations; these are often confused.

=== Economic ===
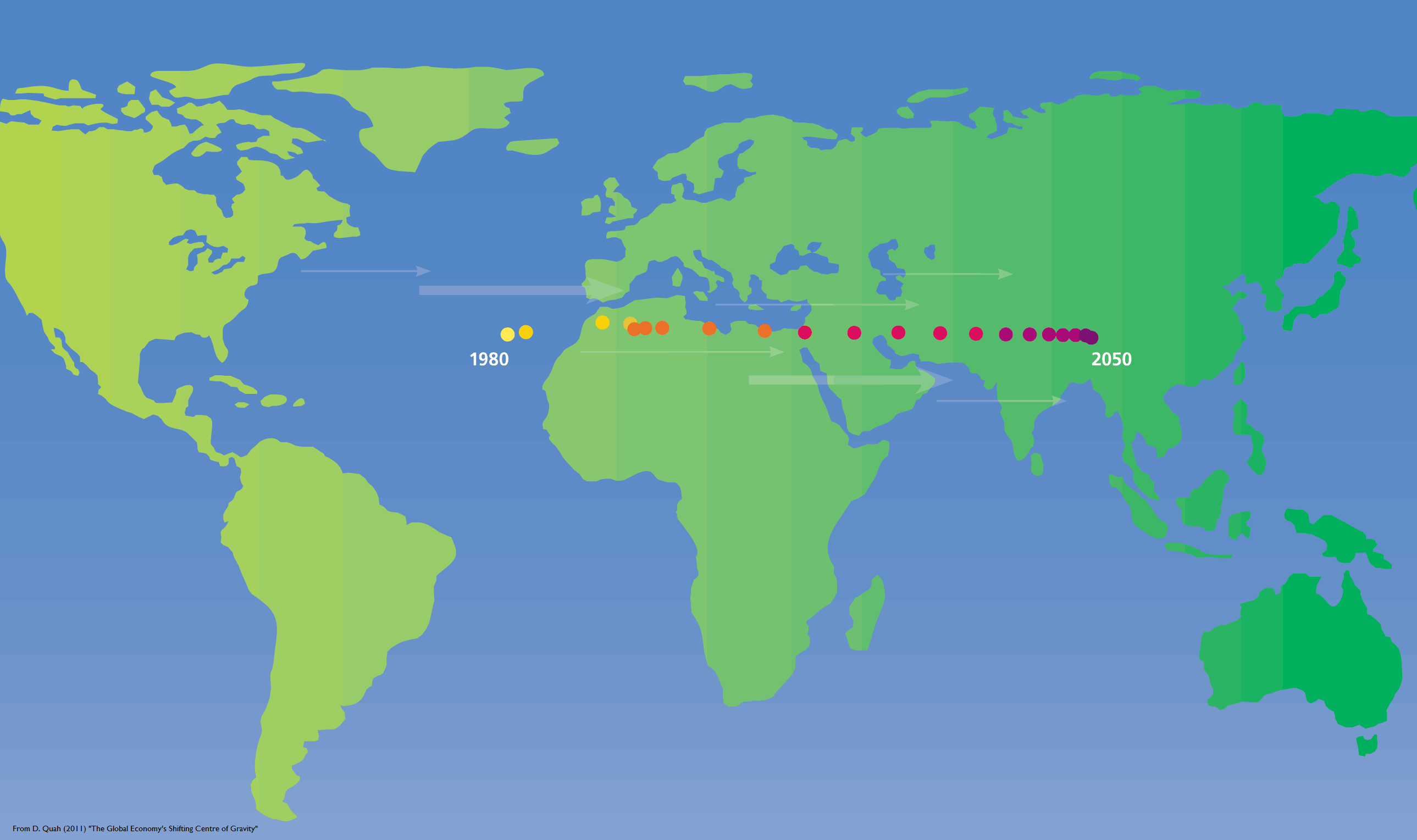
Shift of the world's economic center of gravity since 1980 and projected until 2050

The gravity model of trade in international economics is a model that, in its traditional form, predicts bilateral trade flows based on the economic sizes and distance between two units. Research shows that there is "overwhelming evidence that trade tends to fall with distance."

The related centre of gravity of the world's carbon emission has shifted from Britain during the Industrial Revolution to the Atlantic, back again and contemporarily into Central Asia.

=== Cartographic ===
Null Island
- The point of intersection of the prime meridian and the equator, in the Gulf of Guinea

Geography
- Coordinates: 0°N 0°E

Null Island is the location at zero degrees latitude and zero degrees longitude (), where the prime meridian and the equator intersect in the Atlantic Ocean near the Gulf of Guinea. Since there is no landmass located at these coordinates, it is not an actual island. The name is often used in mapping software as a placeholder to help find and correct database entries that have erroneously been assigned the coordinates 0,0. Although "Null Island" started as a joke within the geospatial community, it has become a useful means of addressing a recurring issue in geographic information science.

=== Cultural ===
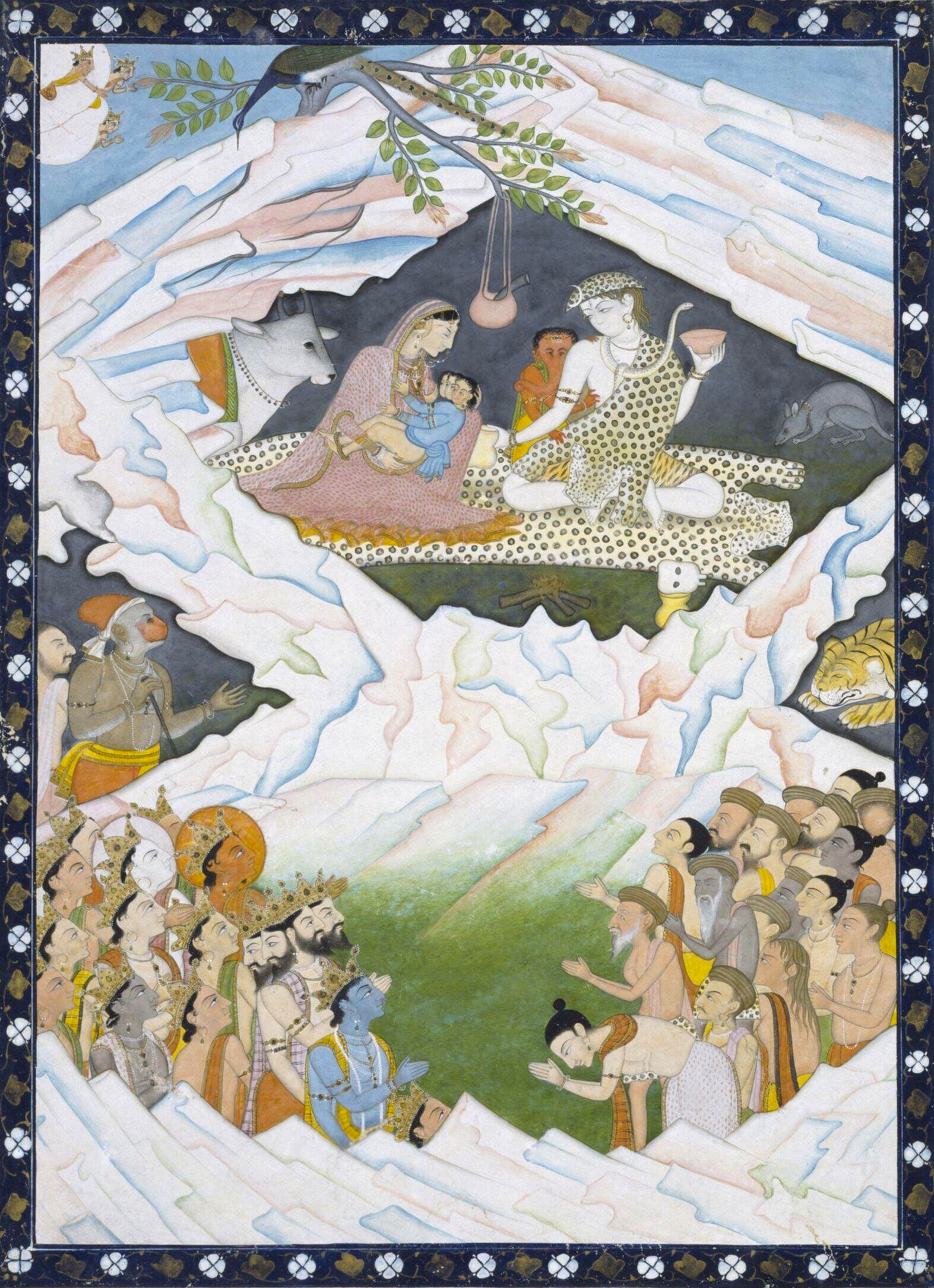
18th-century illustration of Mount Kailash, depicting the holy family: Shiva and Parvati, cradling Skanda with Ganesha by Shiva's side

In astronomy, axis mundi is the Latin term for the axis of Earth between the celestial poles. In a geocentric coordinate system, this is the axis of rotation of the celestial sphere. Consequently, in ancient Greco-Roman astronomy, the axis mundi is the axis of rotation of the planetary spheres within the classical geocentric model of the cosmos.

In 20th-century comparative mythology, the term axis mundi – also called the cosmic axis, world axis, world pillar, center of the world, or world tree – has been greatly extended to refer to any mythological concept representing "the connection between Heaven and Earth" or the "higher and lower realms". Mircea Eliade introduced the concept in the 1950s. Axis mundi closely relates to the mythological concept of the omphalos (navel) of the world or cosmos. Items presented as examples of the axis mundi by comparative mythologists include plants (notably a tree but also other types of plants such as a vine or stalk), a mountain, a column of smoke or fire, or a product of human manufacture (such as a staff, a tower, a ladder, a staircase, a maypole, a cross, a steeple, a rope, a totem pole, a pillar, a spire). Its proximity to heaven may carry implications that are chiefly religious (pagoda, Temple Mount, minaret, church) or secular (obelisk, lighthouse, rocket, skyscraper). The image appears in religious and secular contexts. The axis mundi symbol may be found in cultures utilizing shamanic practices or animist belief systems, in major world religions, and in technologically advanced "urban centers". In Mircea Eliade's opinion: "Every Microcosm, every inhabited region, has a Centre; that is to say, a place that is sacred above all."

Specific examples of cosmic mountains or centers include one from Egyptian texts described as providing support for the sky, Mount Mashu from the Epic of Gilgamesh, Adam's Peak, which is a sacred mountain in Sri Lanka associated with Adam or Buddha in Islamic and Buddhist traditions respectively, Mount Qaf in other Islamic and Arabic cosmologies, the mountain Harā Bərəz in Zoroastrian cosmology, Mount Meru in Hindu, Jain, and Buddhist cosmologies, Mecca as a cosmic center in Sufi cosmology (with minority traditions placing it as Medina or Jerusalem), and, in Tenrikyo, the Jiba at the Tenrikyo Church Headquarters in Tenri, Nara, Japan. In pre-Islamic Arabia, some central temples, including the Temple of Awwam, were cosmic centers.

== See also ==
- Extremes on Earth
- History of the centre of the Universe
  - List of places referred to as the Center of the Universe
