= Nil-Saint-Vincent-Saint-Martin =

Section of Walhain, Wallonia, Belgium

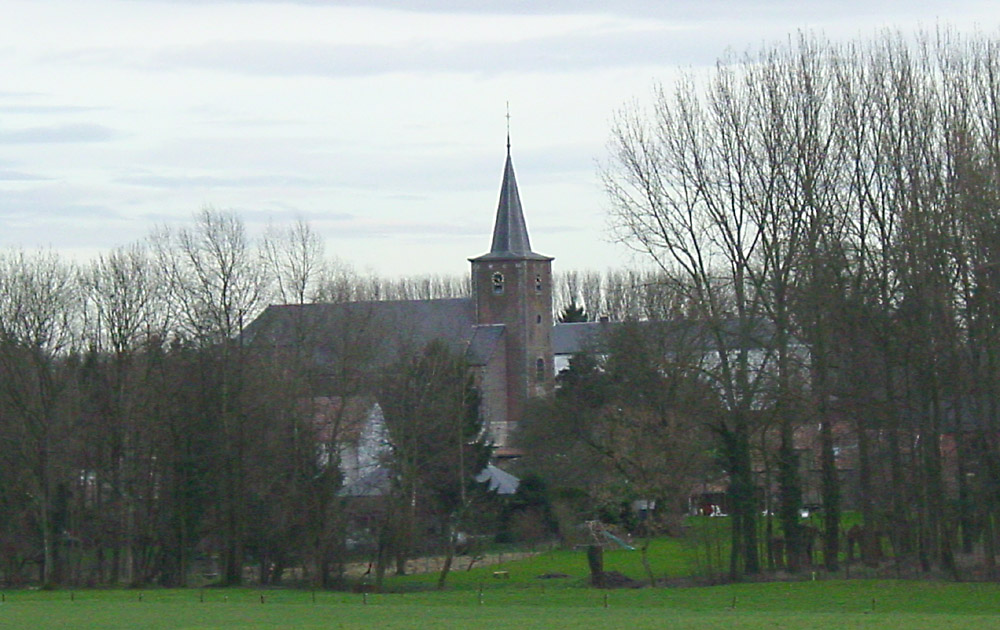
The church of Saint Vincent

Nil-Saint-Vincent-Saint-Martin (Walloon: Nî) is a Belgian village and district of the municipality of Walhain, Wallonia in the province of Walloon Brabant.

The villages of Nil-Saint-Vincent and Nil-Saint-Martin were merged in 1812. 'Nil' is the name of a small river, along whose valley the various areas of settlement (Nil-Pierreux, Nil-Saint-Vincent, Nil-Saint-Martin) lie.

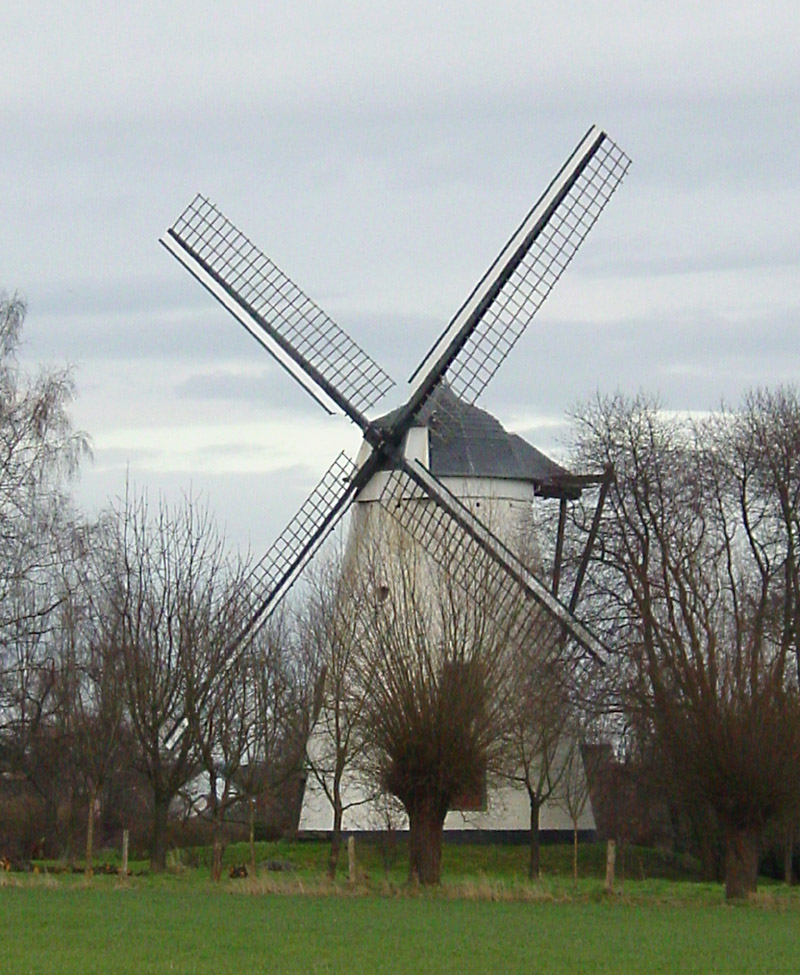
Tiège windmill

== Landmarks ==
Nil-Saint-Vincent-Saint-Martin has several notable landmarks.

=== The Tiège windmill ===
The Tiège windmill was built in 1834 by the Thienpont family. It was used until 23 June 1946 and today is a listed building (monument classé).

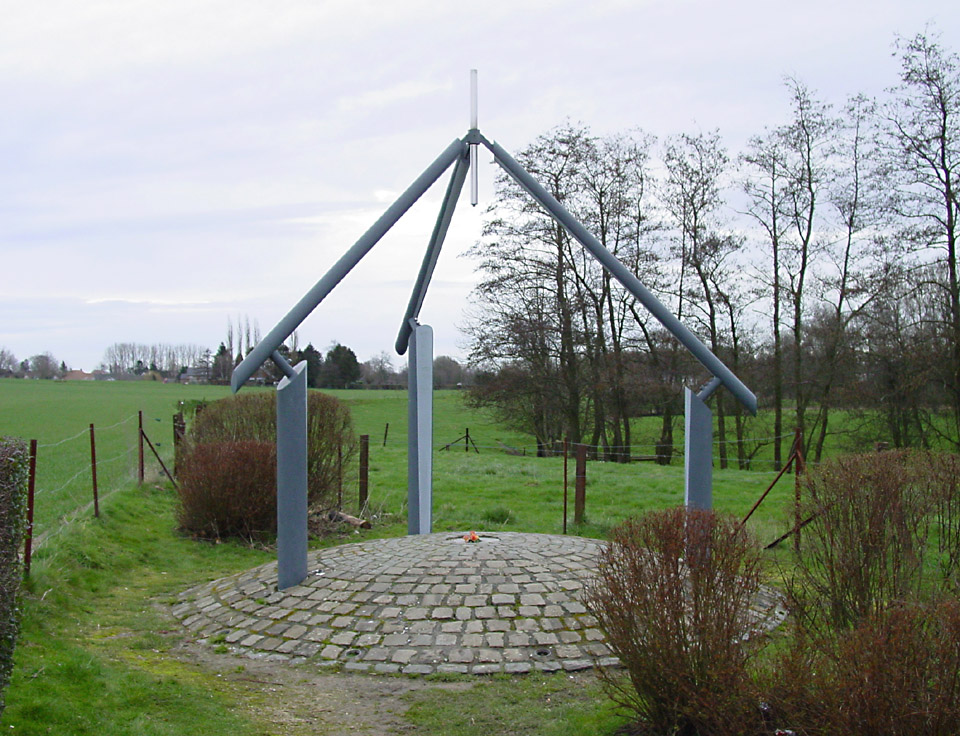
Monument at the geographical centre of Belgium

=== The centre of Belgium ===
The Institut Géographique National, the Belgian national cartographical service, calculated that the geographical centre of Belgium lay in Nil-Saint-Vincent. The architect Bernard Defrenne built a monument for this location, which was inaugurated on 22 August 1998. It is located at coordinates 50°38′28″N 4°40′05″E.
