= Markar Clock Tower =

Geographic Centre of Iran

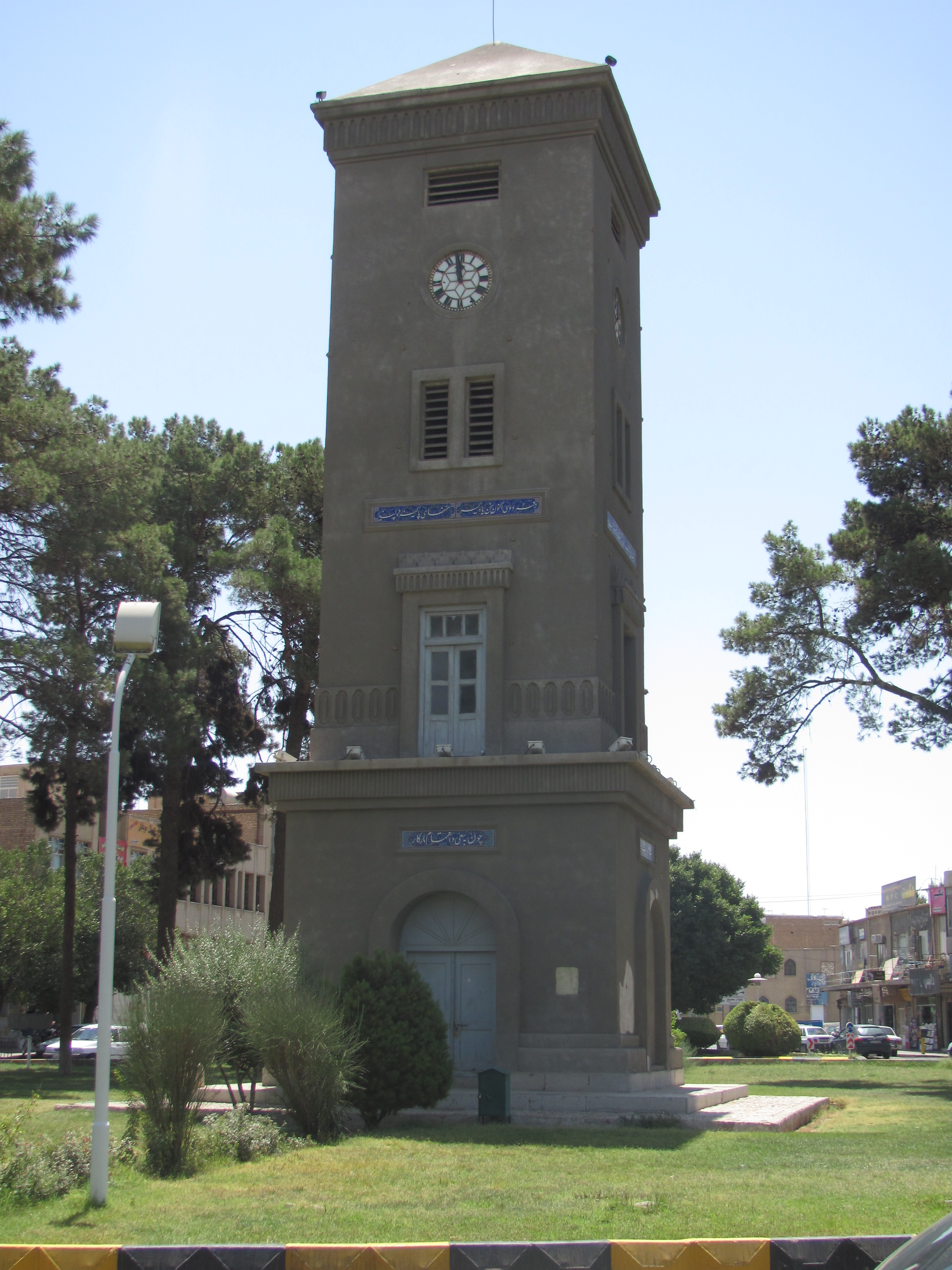
- Interactive map of the Markar Clock Tower area

General information
- Location: Yazd, Iran
- Completed: 26 October 1942

The Markar Clock Tower (Persian: برج ساعت مارکار, romanized: Borj-e Sa'at-e Markar) is a historic clock tower in Yazd, Iran. It is located on the geographic centre of Iran.

== History ==
The Markar Click Tower is named after Pashutanji Marker, a Zoroastrian from India who paid the cost of its construction. The clock tower was constructed on 26 October 1942. The Markar clock tower is located in the middle of the Marker Clock Plaza.

== Architecture ==
The tower has a height of about 4 meters, a square shape, a pyramid on, and looks like an obelisk. The Tower is located in the center point of Iran coordinately. The movement system has been made in London by J. Smith & Sons Co. The spring should be charged weekly.

Mirza Soroush obtained permission for, and supervised the construction of, the Markar Plaza with gardens around it. The plaza is situated on the road to Kerman just north of the Markarabad school entrance.

There are poems on four sides of tower from a local poet, Naser, which located in two lines and should read clockwise. The upper line poem is about Ferdowsi, but the lower line is about the benefactor. The last hemstitch (شادم از کردار نیک مارکار) implies the end time/year of building of tower in Abjad numerals system; 13:20 or 1320 (Solar Hijri), as well as Markar's religion (Zoroastrian) by using one of his religion maxims: "Good Deeds"; (Persian: کردار نیک).

This hemstitch has an Abjad numeric value: 300+1+4+40+1+7+20+200+4+1+200+50+10+20+40+1+200+20+1+200=1320

== Gallery ==
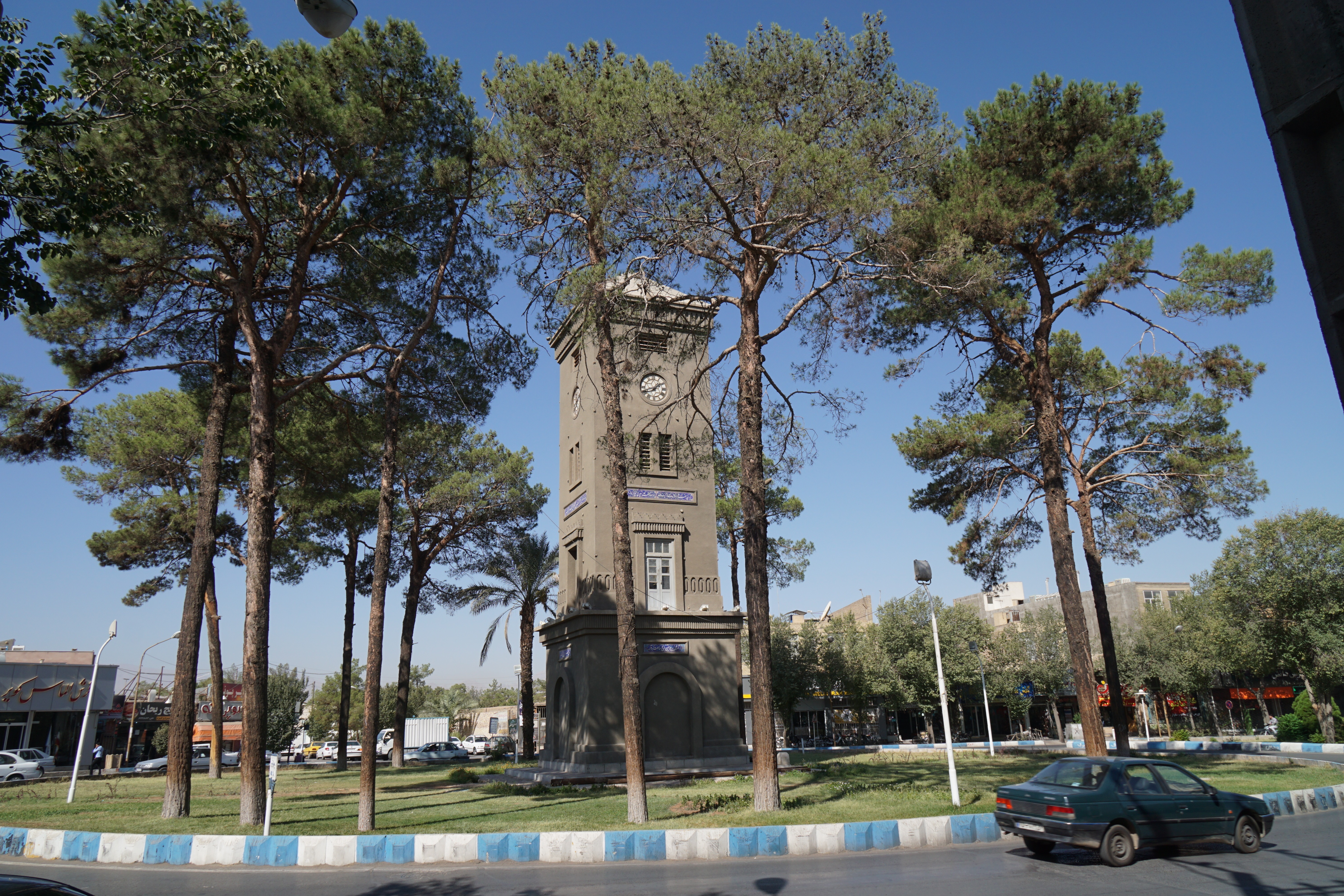
Markar Sa'at Plaza

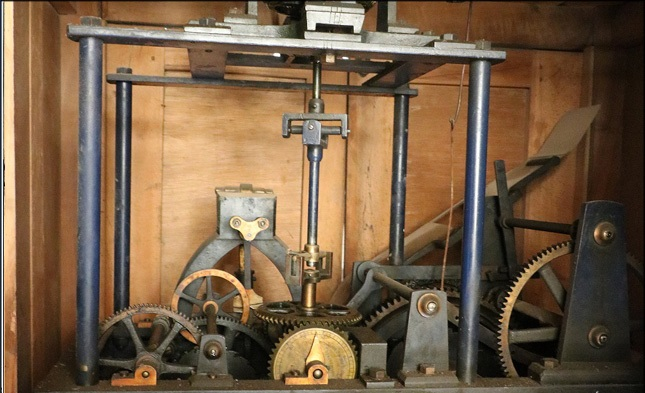
The clock movt. system designed in London.
