= Xavier Dubois =

Belgian politician (born 1983)

Member of the Chamber of Representatives
- Incumbent
- Assumed office 18 July 2024
- Preceded by: Yves Coppieters
- Constituency: Walloon Brabant

Personal details
- Born: 1 August 1983 (age 42)
- Party: Les Engagés

Xavier Dubois (born 1 August 1983) is a Belgian politician serving as a member of the Chamber of Representatives since 2024. He has served as mayor of Walhain since 2018.
