= Geographic center of Belarus =

Center point of the Republic of Belarus

Coordinates: 53°31′45″N 28°02′42″E

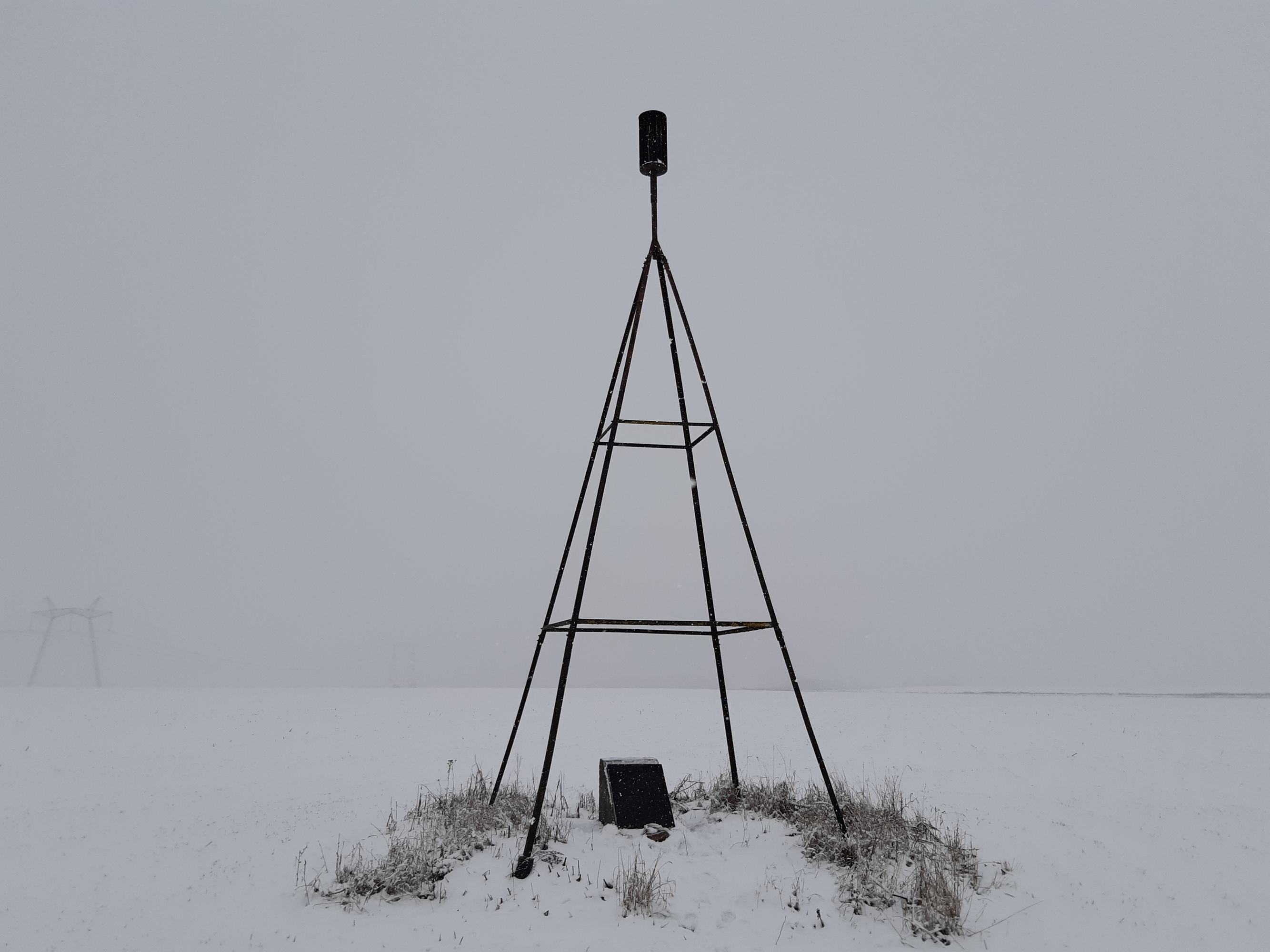
Geographical center of Belarus in the winter.

The geographical center of Belarus (Belarusian: Геаграфічны цэнтр Беларусі) is at the geographical coordinates of latitude 53°31'44.54", longitude 28°02'41.90". It is located 70-km south-east of Minsk, a 6-km west of Marina Hills, and 1 km to the south-east of the village Antonovo, Pukhovisky District, Minsk Oblast, Belarus.

Search works were carried out in 1996 by the 82nd expedition association "Belgeodesy" in cooperation with the firm "Aerogeokart" a special program using the 1:200 000 maps and satellites to find the geographic center of Belarus.

The geographical coordinates of the center of Belarus are entered into the State Geodetic directory as the state geodetic grid points.

On May 1, 1996, near the village of Antonovo, a pillar was erected with the sign "The village Antonovo – the geographical center of the Republic of Belarus".
